= Tomoo Nakamura =

Pilot officer in the Imperial Japanese Army during the Second World War

- 中村 友男
- Military career
- Allegiance: Empire of Japan
- Branch: Imperial Japanese Navy Air Service (IJN)
- Rank: Commander
- Units: Misawa Air Group; 705th Air Group
- Conflicts: World War II; Guadalcanal Campaign; Battle of Rennell Island; New Guinea Campaign; Operation I-Go

Tomoo Nakamura (中村 友男, Nakamura Tomoo) was a medium bomber pilot officer in the Imperial Japanese Navy (IJN) during World War II. He was the leader of the Misawa Air Group (later redesignated to 705th Air Group) during Guadalcanal Campaign and New Guinea Campaign and commanded Rabaul-based medium bombers in various battles in 1942 and 1943.

== Early career ==
Tomoo Nakamura graduated from merchant marine college. In May 1933, he became Reserve Ensign and entered a reserve pilot training program of the navy, where he specialized in medium bomber aircraft. On 1 August 1934, he was transferred from reserve officer rank to regular officer rank.

== Pacific War ==
Lieutenant Tomoo Nakamura became the leader (Hikōtaichō) of the Misawa Air Group when it was formed on 10 February 1942 in Misawa, Japan. The group operated Mitsubishi G4M medium bombers and was ordered to move to Rabaul on New Britain after the Allied landing on Guadalcanal and Tulagi on 7 August. On 8 August, Lieutenant Nakamura led 18 medium bombers to Rabaul, and he also brought Vice Admiral Nishizō Tsukahara, the commander of the 11th Air Fleet. The following day, he led 17 torpedo-armed bombers to search for the enemy carriers in the vicinity of Guadalcanal. When he could not locate the carriers, he settled on attacking and sinking the destroyer Jarvis, which was damaged during the previous day and was leaving the area. He lost two bombers in the attack.

On 17 August, Lieutenant Nakamura led 25 bombers to raid the airfield at Port Moresby on New Guinea, which destroyed several Allied aircraft on the ground. On 26 August, he led a mixed formation of 17 bombers from Misawa and Kisarazu Air Group to attack recently finished Henderson Field on Guadalcanal. The attack resulted in the destruction of 2,000 gallons of aviation fuel and several Allied aircraft damaged on the ground. However, in return, his formation lost two bombers to intercepting US Marine Grumman F4F Wildcat fighters. On 11 September, he again led a raid on Henderson Field composed of 27 bombers from Misawa, Kisarazu and Chitose Air Group and lost one bomber. On 13 September, he commanded a similar formation composed of Misawa, Kisarazu and Kanoya Air Group bombers and attacked Taivu Point, located about 30 kilometres east of Henderson Field. This time his formation suffered the loss of two bombers.

Lieutenant Nakamura's subordinates led Misawa bombers in further raids on Guadalcanal throughout October. On 1 November, he was promoted to lieutenant commander, while Misawa Air Group was redesignated to 705th Air Group. On 11 November, Lieutenant Commander Nakamura led 16 torpedo-armed bombers against the enemy ships around Guadalcanal. His formation was intercepted by 16 Wildcat and eight Bell P-39 Airacobra fighters, while at the same time they were also met with heavy AA fire from the ships. They lost 11 bombers and the rest sustained severe damage, of which some (including Nakamura) could not reach Rabaul and had to make emergency landings at Buin on Bougainville. Heavy losses in this single mission prompted the commanders at Rabaul to cease further raids by medium bombers against Guadalcanal.

On 28 January 1943, Lieutenant Commander Nakamura led 16 torpedo-armed bombers in the attack against enemy ships spotted near Rennell Island. They scored no hits and in return lost one bomber. On 12 April, Lieutenant Commander Nakamura led 27 bombers against Port Moresby during Operation I-Go. Two days later, they also participated in a raid against Milne Bay. Nakamura was promoted to commander at the end of the war.
