= Operation Vengeance =

U.S. operation to kill Admiral Yamamoto, 18 April 1943

- Part of the Pacific Theater of World War II
- "Death of Japanese Admiral Isoroku Yamamoto" by Vaughan Alden Bass
Date	18 April 1943; 83 years ago
Location	near Panguna, Bougainville, Territory of New Guinea
Result	American victory

Belligerents
United States	Empire of Japan

Commanders and leaders
(United States) William F. Halsey Jr. (United States) John W. Mitchell	(Empire of Japan) Isoroku Yamamoto † (Empire of Japan) Matome Ugaki (WIA)

Units involved
13th Air Force: 13th Fighter Command; 347th Fighter Group; 339th Fighter Squadron	11th Air Fleet: 26th Air Flotilla; 204th Naval Air Group; 705th Naval Air Group

Strength
18 P-38G fighter aircraft	2 G4M1 bombers, 6 A6M3 fighter aircraft

Casualties and losses
1 P-38G fighter aircraft lost, 1 pilot killed	2 bombers destroyed, 1 fighter damaged, 20 killed inc. Admiral Yamamoto

Operation Vengeance was the American military operation to kill Admiral Isoroku Yamamoto of the Imperial Japanese Navy on 18 April 1943 during the Solomon Islands campaign in the Pacific Theater of World War II. Yamamoto, commander of the Combined Fleet of the Imperial Japanese Navy, was killed near Bougainville Island when his G4M1 transport aircraft was shot down by United States Army Air Forces fighter aircraft operating from Kukum Field on Guadalcanal.

The mission of the U.S. aircraft was specifically to kill Yamamoto, made possible because of United States Navy intelligence decoding transmissions about Yamamoto's travel itinerary through the Solomon Islands area. The death of Yamamoto reportedly damaged the morale of Japanese naval personnel, raised the morale of the Allied forces, and was intended as revenge by U.S. leaders, who blamed Yamamoto for the attack on Pearl Harbor that initiated the war between Imperial Japan and the United States.

The U.S. pilots claimed to have shot down three twin-engine bombers and two fighters during the mission, but Japanese records show only two bombers were shot down. There is a controversy over which pilot shot down Yamamoto's plane, but most modern historians credit Rex T. Barber.

== Background ==
New Guinea, the Bismarck Archipelago and the Solomon Islands; Yamamoto's planned two-hour flight on April 18, 1943, from Rabaul on New Britain to the small island of Balalae near Bougainville Island

Admiral Isoroku Yamamoto, commander of the Imperial Japanese Navy, scheduled an inspection tour of the Solomon Islands and New Guinea. He planned to inspect Japanese air units participating in Operation I-Go that had begun 7 April 1943; in addition, the tour would boost Japanese morale following the disastrous Guadalcanal campaign and its subsequent evacuation during January and February.

== Intelligence ==
On 14 April the U.S. naval intelligence effort code-named "Magic" intercepted and decrypted orders alerting affected Japanese units of the tour. The original message, NTF131755, addressed to the commanders of Base Unit No. 1, the 11th Air Flotilla, and the 26th Air Flotilla, was encoded in the Japanese Naval Cipher JN-25D, and was picked up by three stations of the "Magic" apparatus, including Fleet Radio Unit Pacific Fleet. The message was then deciphered by Navy cryptographers (among them future Supreme Court Justice John Paul Stevens); it contained time and location details of Yamamoto's itinerary, as well as the number and types of planes that would transport and accompany him on the journey.

The decrypted text revealed that on 18 April Yamamoto would fly from Rabaul to Balalae Airfield, on an island near Bougainville in the Solomon Islands. He and his staff would fly in two medium bombers (Mitsubishi G4M Bettys of the Kōkūtai 705), escorted by six navy fighters (Mitsubishi A6M Zero fighters of the Kōkūtai 204), to depart Rabaul at 06:00 and arrive at Balalae at 08:00, Tokyo time.

The U.S. Army Military Intelligence Service (MIS) was made up mostly of Nisei (second-generation Japanese Americans). They were trained in interpretation, interrogation, and translation of Japanese materials ranging from standard textbooks to captured documents. Information leading to Yamamoto's ambush was a significant MIS contribution in the Solomons campaign. MIS Technical Sergeant Harold Fudenna translated an intercepted radio message indicating the itinerary of Yamamoto. Although this message was first met with skepticism that the Japanese would be so careless, other MIS linguists in Alaska and Hawaii had also intercepted the same message, confirming its accuracy.

President Franklin D. Roosevelt may have authorized Secretary of the Navy Frank Knox to "get Yamamoto", but no official record of such an order exists, and sources disagree whether he did so. Knox essentially let Admiral Chester W. Nimitz make the decision. Nimitz first consulted Admiral William F. Halsey Jr., Commander, South Pacific, and then authorized the mission on 17 April. These U.S. commanders judged that the benefits of a successful mission included that Japanese morale would be negatively affected by news of Yamamoto's death and that Yamamoto's replacement would be less capable. When the issue was raised that the mission could reveal that the United States had broken Japanese naval codes, the commanders decided the knowledge could be protected as long as the true source of the intelligence was kept hidden from unauthorized American personnel and the press.

== Interception ==
The Solomon Islands; Kukum Field on Guadalcanal, the interception flight's base, and the crash site of Yamamoto's aircraft on Bougainville Island

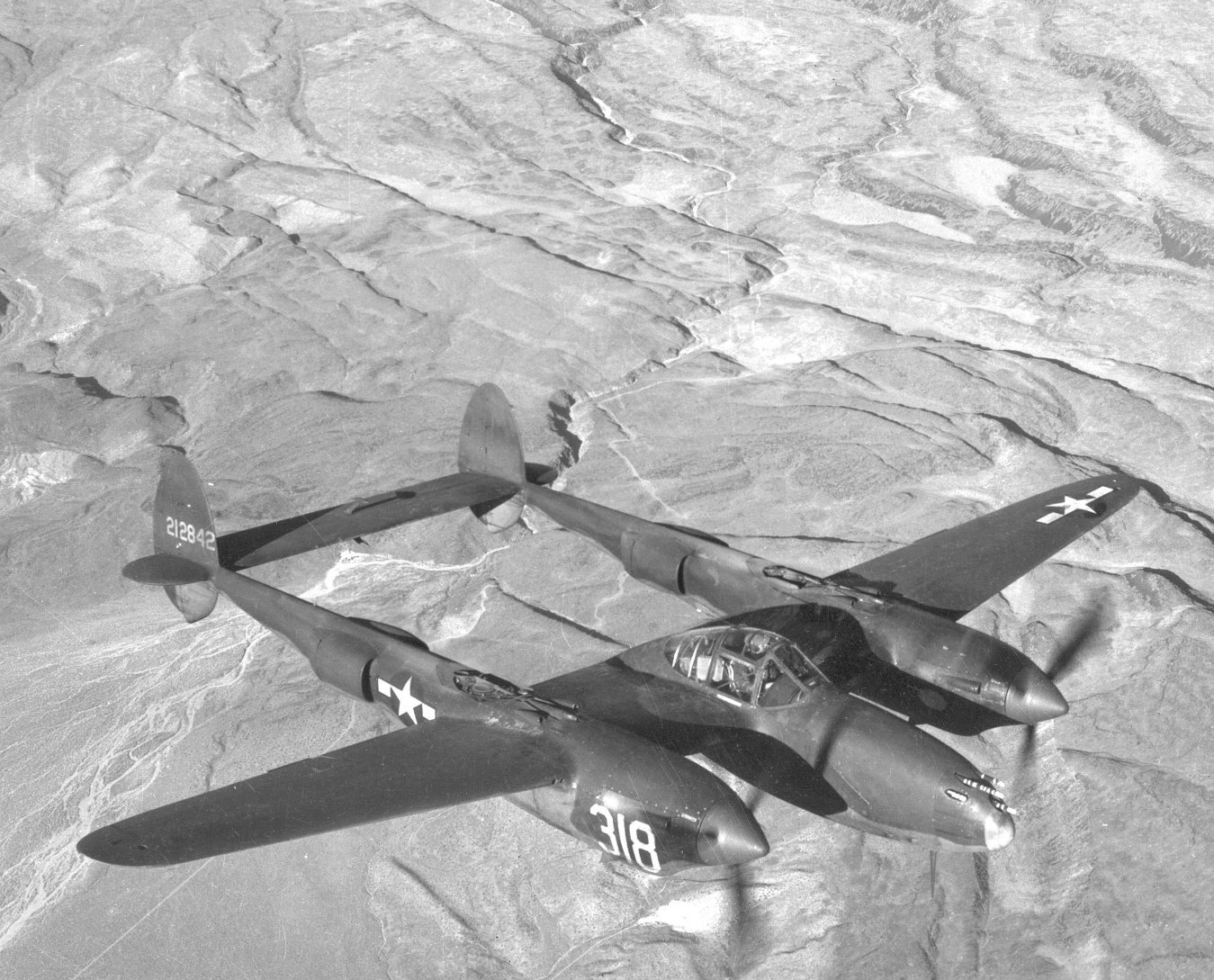
P-38G Lightnings were the aircraft chosen to carry out the mission.

To avoid detection by radar and Japanese personnel stationed in the Solomon Islands along a straight-line distance of about 400 miles (640 km) between U.S. forces and Bougainville, the mission entailed an over-water flight south and west of the Solomons. This roundabout approach was plotted and measured to be about 600 miles (970 km). The fighters would, therefore, travel 600 miles out to the target and 400 miles back. The 1,000-mile flight, with extra fuel allotted for combat, was beyond the range of the F4F Wildcat and F4U Corsair fighters then available to Navy and Marine squadrons based on Guadalcanal. The mission was instead assigned to the 339th Fighter Squadron, 347th Fighter Group, whose P-38G Lightning aircraft, equipped with drop tanks, were the only American fighters in the Pacific with the range to intercept, engage and return.

339th Squadron Commander Major John W. Mitchell, already an ace pilot, was chosen to lead the flight. For better navigation, Mitchell asked for a navy compass, which was provided by Marine Corps Lieutenant Colonel Luther S. Moore and installed in Mitchell's P-38 the day before the attack. All of the P-38 fighters mounted their standard armament of one 20 mm cannon and four .50-caliber (12.7 mm) machine guns, and were equipped to carry two 165-US-gallon (620 L) drop tanks under their wings. A limited supply of 330-US-gallon (1,200 L) tanks was flown up from New Guinea, sufficient to provide each Lightning with one large tank to replace one of the small tanks. The difference in size put approximately 1,000 pounds (450 kg) greater weight on one side of the aircraft, but the tanks were located close enough to the aircraft's center of gravity to avoid serious performance problems.

Eighteen P-38s were assigned the mission. One flight of four was designated as the "killer" flight, while the remainder, which included two spares, would climb to 18,000 feet (5,500 m) to act as "top cover" for the expected reaction by Japanese fighters based at Kahili. A flight plan was prepared by the Command Operations Officer, Marine Major John Condon, but this was discarded by Mitchell who thought the airspeeds and time estimates were not best for intercepting Yamamoto. With several of his pilots assisting, Mitchell calculated an intercept time of 09:35, based on the itinerary, to catch the bombers descending over Bougainville, 10 minutes before landing at Balalae. He worked back from that time and drew four precisely calculated legs, with a fifth leg curving in a search pattern in case Yamamoto was not seen at the chosen point. In addition to heading out over the Coral Sea, the 339th would "wave-hop" all the way to Bougainville at altitudes no greater than 50 feet (15 m), maintaining radio silence.

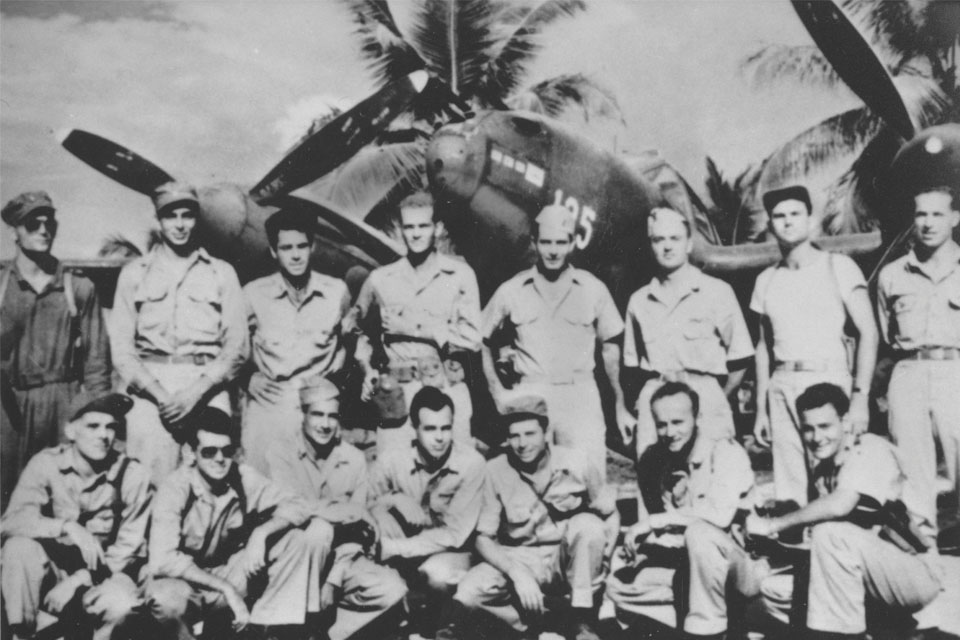
339th Fighter Squadron personnel of the mission. Back row (l to r): Ames, Graebner, Lanphier, Goerke, Jacobson, Stratton, Long, Anglin. Front row (l to r): Smith, Canning, Holmes, Barber, Mitchell, Kittel, Whitakker. Not pictured: Hine (MIA).

Although the 339th Fighter Squadron led the mission, 10 of the 18 pilots were drawn from the other two squadrons of the 347th Group, (8 from the 12th FS and 2 from the 70th FS). The Commander AirSols, Rear Admiral Marc A. Mitscher, selected four pilots to be designated as the "killer" flight:

- Captain Thomas G. Lanphier Jr.
- Lieutenant Rex T. Barber
- Lieutenant Jim McLanahan (dropped out with flat tire)
- Lieutenant Joe Moore (dropped out with faulty fuel feed)

The remaining pilots would act as reserves and provide air cover against any retaliatory attacks by local Japanese fighters:

- Major John Mitchell
- Lieutenant William Smith
- Lieutenant Gordon Whittiker
- Lieutenant Roger Ames
- Major Louis Kittel
- Lieutenant Lawrence Graebner
- Lieutenant Doug Canning
- Lieutenant Delton Goerke
- Lieutenant Julius Jacobson
- Lieutenant Eldon Stratton
- Lieutenant Albert Long
- Lieutenant Everett Anglin
- Lieutenant Besby F. Holmes (replaced McLanahan)
- Lieutenant Raymond K. Hine (replaced Moore)

A briefing included the designated cover story for the source of the intelligence stating it had come from Australian coastwatchers, who supposedly had spotted an important high-ranking officer boarding an aircraft at Rabaul. Several historians say that the pilots were not specifically briefed on the identity of their target, but Thomas Alexander Hughes writes that Mitscher told the assembled pilots it was Yamamoto, to "provide additional incentive" to the fliers.

The specially fitted P-38s took off from Kukum Field on Guadalcanal beginning at 07:25 on 18 April. Two of the Lightnings assigned to the killer flight dropped out of the mission at the start, one with a tire flattened during takeoff (McLanahan) and the second when its drop tanks would not feed fuel to the engines (Moore).

In Rabaul, despite urgings by local Japanese commanders to cancel the trip for fear of ambush, Yamamoto's airplanes took off as scheduled for the trip of 315 miles (507 km). They climbed to 6,500 feet (2,000 m), with their fighter escort at their 4 o'clock position and 1,500 feet (460 m) higher, split into two V-formations of three planes.

Mitchell's flight of four led the squadron at low altitude, with the killer flight, consisting of Lanphier, Barber, and spares Besby F. Holmes and Raymond K. Hine, immediately behind. Mitchell, fighting off drowsiness, navigated solely by dead reckoning (speed and compass heading). This has been called the longest-distance fighter-intercept mission of the war.

Mitchell and his force arrived at the intercept point one minute early, at 09:34, just as Yamamoto's aircraft descended into view in a light haze. The P-38s jettisoned the auxiliary tanks, turned to the right to parallel the bombers, and began a full power climb to intercept them.

The tanks on Holmes's P-38 did not detach, and his two-man element turned back toward the sea. Mitchell radioed Lanphier and Barber to engage, and they climbed toward the eight aircraft. The nearest escort fighters dropped their own tanks and dived toward the pair of P-38s. Lanphier immediately turned head-on and climbed towards the escorts while Barber chased the diving bomber transports. Barber banked steeply to turn in behind the bombers and momentarily lost sight of them, but when he regained contact, he was immediately behind one and began firing into its right engine, rear fuselage, and empennage. When Barber hit its left engine, the bomber began to trail heavy black smoke. The Betty rolled violently to the left, and Barber narrowly avoided a mid-air collision. Looking back, he saw a column of black smoke and assumed the Betty had crashed into the jungle. Barber headed towards the coast at treetop level, searching for the second bomber, not knowing which one carried the targeted high-ranking officer.

Barber spotted the second bomber—carrying Chief of Staff Vice Admiral Matome Ugaki and part of Yamamoto's staff—low over the water off Moila Point, trying to evade an attack by Holmes, whose wing tanks had finally come off. Holmes damaged the right engine of the Betty, which emitted a white vapor trail, but his closure speed carried him and his wingman Hine past the damaged bomber. Barber attacked the crippled bomber, and his bullet strikes caused it to shed metal debris that damaged his own aircraft. The bomber descended and crash-landed in the water. Ugaki and two others survived the crash and were later rescued. Barber, Holmes and Hine were attacked by Zeros, with Barber's P-38 receiving 104 hits. Holmes and Barber each claimed a Zero shot down during this melee, although Japanese records show that no Zeros were lost. The top cover briefly engaged reacting Zeros without making any kills. Mitchell observed the column of smoke from Yamamoto's crashed bomber. Hine's P-38 had disappeared by this point, presumably crashed into the water. Running close to minimum fuel levels for return to base, the P-38s broke off contact, with Holmes so short of fuel that he was forced to land in the Russell Islands. Hine was the only American pilot who did not return. Lanphier's actions during the battle are unclear as his account was later disputed by other participants, including the Japanese fighter pilots. As he approached Henderson Field, Lanphier radioed the fighter director on Guadalcanal that "That son of a bitch will not be dictating any peace terms in the White House", breaching security and endangering the code-breaking program. Upon landing, one engine quit from fuel starvation. He immediately put in a claim for shooting down Yamamoto.

== Aftermath ==
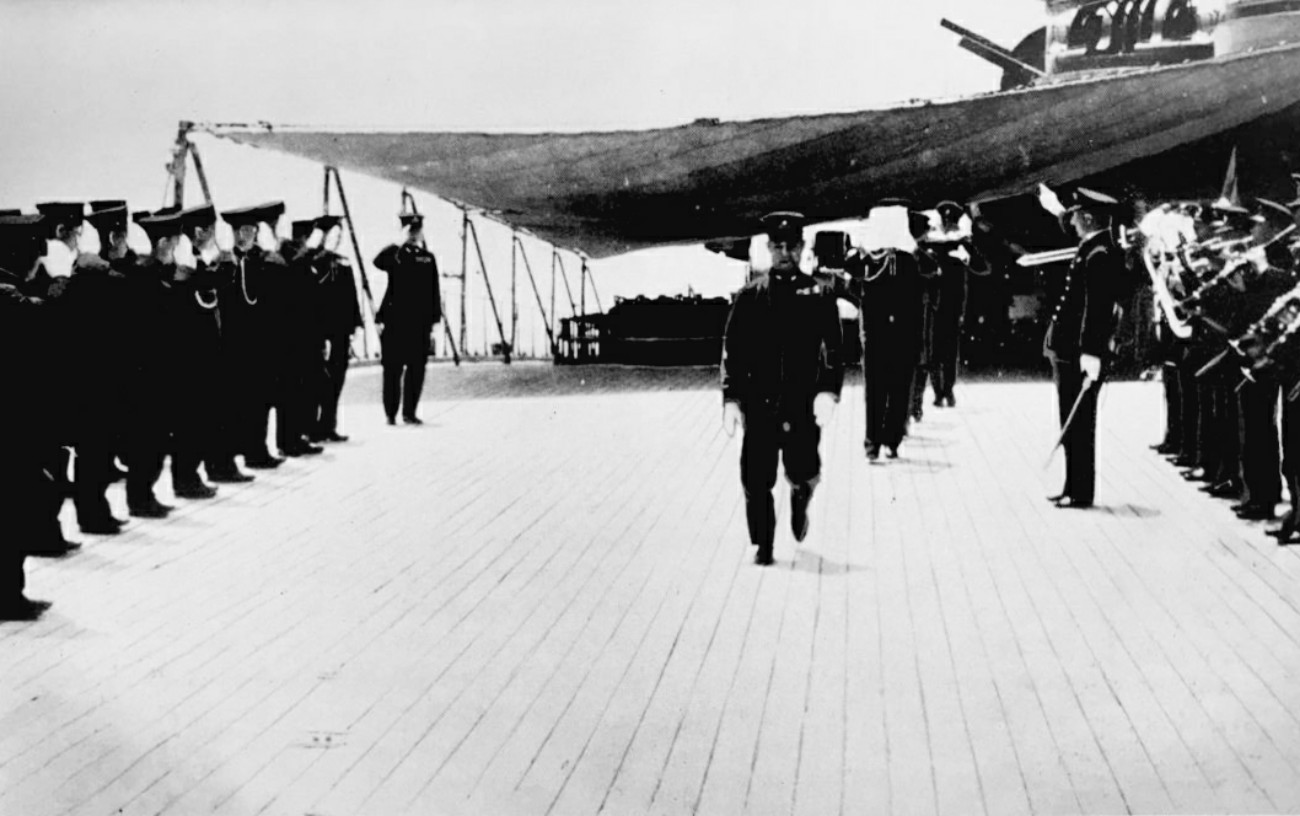
Yamamoto's ashes return to Japan at Kisarazu aboard battleship Musashi on May 23, 1943

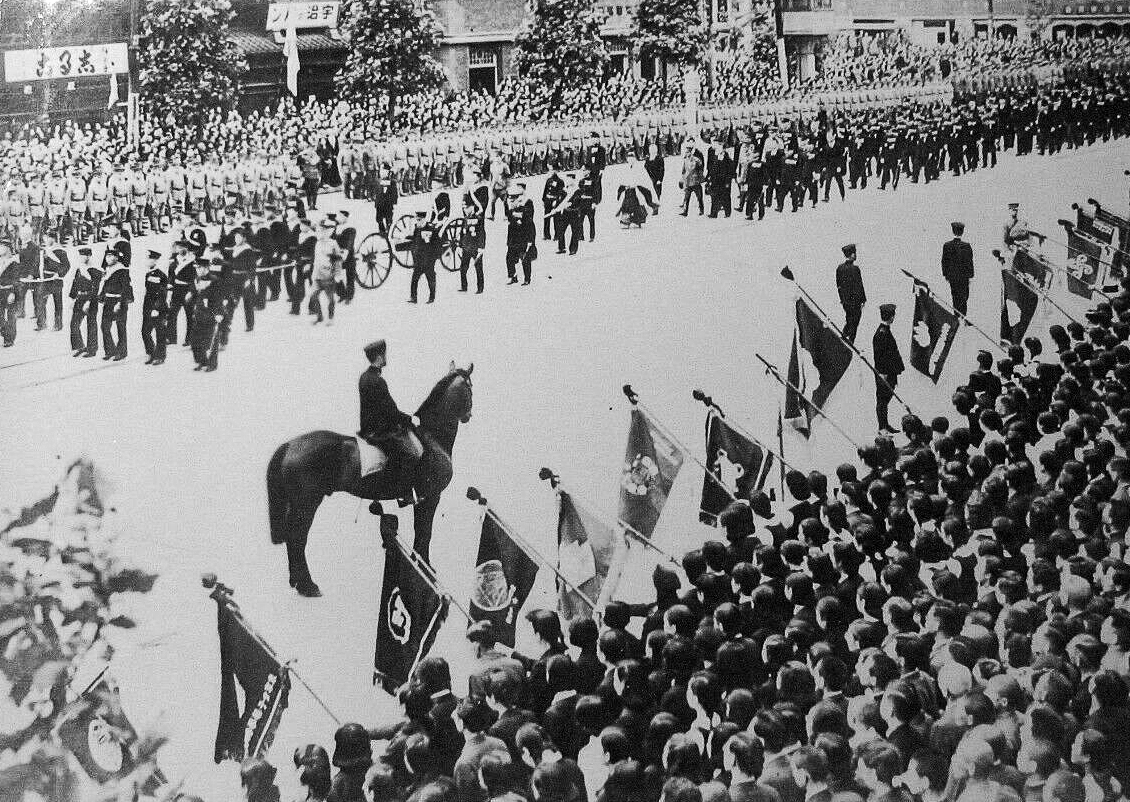
Yamamoto's state funeral, June 5, 1943

The crash site and body of Yamamoto were found on 19 April, the day after the attack, by a Japanese search-and-rescue party led by army engineer Lieutenant Tsuyoshi Hamasuna. The crash site was located in the jungle north of the coastal site of the former Australian patrol post and Catholic mission of Buin (which was re-established after the war several kilometers inland).

The retrieval party noted Yamamoto had been thrown clear of the plane's wreckage, his white-gloved hand grasping the hilt of his katana, his body still upright in his seat under a tree. Hamasuna said Yamamoto was instantly recognizable, his head tilted down as if deep in thought. A post-mortem of Yamamoto indicated two bullet wounds, one to the back of his left shoulder, and a separate wound to his left lower jaw that appeared to exit above his right eye. The Japanese navy doctor examining Yamamoto's body determined the head wound killed Yamamoto. These more violent details of Yamamoto's death were hidden from the Japanese public, and the medical report whitewashed, this secrecy "on orders from above" according to biographer Hiroyuki Agawa.

In Japan, Yamamoto's killing became known as the "Navy A (kō) incident". It raised morale in the United States and shocked the Japanese, who were officially told about the incident only on 21 May. The announcement said that the admiral was killed in April while directing strategy on the front lines and had "engaged in combat with the enemy and met gallant death on a war plane."

Norman Lodge, an Associated Press correspondent in the South Pacific, found out what had happened and filed a detailed story about the mission on 11 May which said the United States had been tracking Yamamoto for five days before the shoot-down, but U.S. military censors prevented the story from going out. At this point, U.S. officials had not disclosed anything about the operation, and the American public first learned of Yamamoto's death when the 21 May Japanese statement was covered in the news. The Japanese account was augmented by American writers noting that Yamamoto's purported claim that he would dictate peace terms to the United States from a seat in the White House was now sure not to happen. Roosevelt was quoted as saying "Gosh!" on 21 May upon supposedly learning the news from reporters about the Japanese announcement. Over the next couple of days there were stories in the U.S. press speculating that the Japanese announcement was a cover for Yamamoto having committed hara-kiri because the war was not going well for the Japanese. Then on 31 May Time magazine ran separate stories several pages apart, one which reported the Japanese announcement and one which related how Lanphier and his P-38 pilots on Guadalcanal had shot down three Japanese bombers over Bougainville and then flown home wondering if they had killed "some Jap bigwig" in the bombers. However, the Japanese did not draw any conclusions from this.

Regardless of any cover story, intelligence officials in Great Britain were upset by the operation; not having suffered the Pearl Harbor attack themselves, they did not have the same visceral feelings towards Yamamoto and did not think that killing any one admiral was worth the risk to Allied codebreaking abilities against Japan. Indeed, Prime Minister Winston Churchill protested to Roosevelt against the decision to go ahead with the operation.

The American public did not learn the full story of the operation, including that it was based on broken codes, until 10 September 1945 after the conclusion of the war, when many papers published an Associated Press account. Even then U.S. intelligence was frustrated because they wanted to keep the secret longer as they were still debriefing Japanese intelligence officers and feared knowledge of the code-breaking would rush those officers into shame-driven suicide.

== Crash site ==
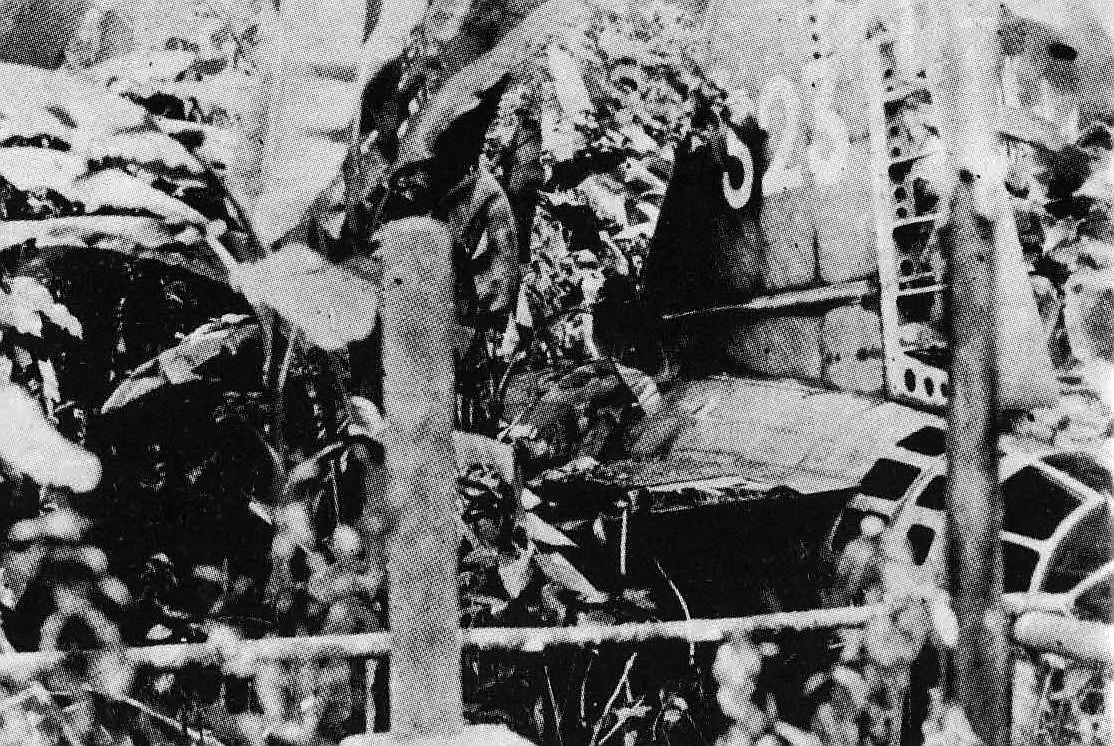
Yamamoto's Mitsubishi "Betty" bomber in the jungle of Bougainville

The remains of Yamamoto's aircraft, 323 of the 705th Kokutai, lie in the jungle around 9 miles (14 km) from the town of Panguna, (06°47.165′S 155°33.137′E). The crash site is around an hour's walk from the nearest road.

Although the aircraft wreckage has been heavily scavenged by souvenir hunters, parts of the fuselage remain where it crashed. The site is on private land. Access was previously difficult as the ownership of the land was disputed. However, as of 2015, it is possible for visitors to gain access to the site by prior arrangement.

Part of one wing has been removed and is displayed, on permanent loan, at the Isoroku Yamamoto Family Museum in Nagaoka, Japan. One of the aircraft's doors is at the Papua New Guinea National Museum and Art Gallery.

== Credit controversy ==
Although Operation Vengeance was notable for its target, there has been controversy about who shot down the admiral's aircraft. The issue began immediately after the mission when the U.S. military credited Captain Thomas Lanphier with the kill. Lanphier claimed in his report that after turning to engage the escort Zeros and shooting the wings off one, he had flipped upside down as he circled back towards the two bombers. Upon seeing the lead bomber turning in a circle below him, he came out of his turn at a right angle to the circling bomber and fired, blowing off its right wing. The plane then crashed into the jungle. Lanphier also reported that he saw Lieutenant Rex Barber shoot down another bomber which also crashed into the jungle.

From the report, U.S. intelligence assumed that three bombers had been downed because Lieutenant Besby F. Holmes claimed the "Betty" that crashed into the sea. None of the remaining pilots were debriefed after the mission because no formal interrogation procedures existed on Guadalcanal at that time. Likewise, Lanphier's claim of the kill was not officially witnessed. Many of the mission's other pilots were skeptical of the official U.S. Army version. Six months later, unauthorized details about the operation leaked into the press. In October 1943, an issue of Time magazine featured an article about Vengeance and mentioned Lanphier by name. An outraged U.S. Navy considered it a serious breach of security. As a result, Major John Mitchell's nomination for the Medal of Honor was downgraded to the Navy Cross; this was the same award subsequently presented to all the pilots of the killer flight.

The controversy did not subside after the war because of the testimony of the surviving Japanese escort pilot who witnessed the mission. Zero pilot Kenji Yanagiya, who had been in Yamamoto's fighter escort, told Mitchell he might have been responsible for the loss of Hine because he had heavily damaged a P-38 (escorting another Lightning that had not dropped its fuel tanks), although neither he nor any of the other Zero pilots had claimed a P-38 that day. The cause of Hine's disappearance is still officially undetermined. Yanagiya also affirmed that none of the escorting Japanese fighters were shot down, stating that only one was damaged enough that it required a half day of repair at Buin. These details contradicted Lanphier's claim for a Zero. Likewise, Japanese military records confirmed that only two Mitsubishi G4M bombers had been shot down on the day. Eventually, Lanphier and Barber were officially awarded half credits for the destruction of the bomber that crashed into the jungle, and half credits to Barber and Holmes for the bomber that crashed at sea. Several ground inspections of Yamamoto's crash site have determined that the path of the bullet impacts validated Barber's account because "all visible gunfire and shrapnel damage was caused by bullets entering from immediately behind the bomber," not from the right.

Subsequently, Barber petitioned the Air Force Board for Correction of Military Records to have his half credit on the bomber shared with Lanphier changed to a whole credit. In September 1991, the Air Force History Office advised the board that "enough uncertainty" existed in both Lanphier's and Barber's claims for them both to be accepted; the board's decision was split on Barber's petition. Secretary of the Air Force Donald Rice ruled to retain the shared credit. Barber then applied to the U.S. 9th Circuit Court of Appeals to have the ruling of the Secretary of the Air Force overturned and the opposing claims re-investigated, but the court did not intervene. Military historian Daniel L. Haulman, who was a member of the US Air Force panel that reviewed the case in 1985, stated in 2024 that after reviewing new evidence, "I have become convinced that, despite the panel decision and the subsequent Rice decision, credit for shooting down Yamamoto's plane really should go to Rex Barber."

In May 2006, Air Force Magazine published a letter by Doug Canning, a former pilot of the 347th Fighter Group who flew on Operation Vengeance (he escorted Holmes back to the Russell Islands). Canning, who was friends with both Lanphier and Barber, stated that Lanphier had written the official report, medal citations, and several magazine articles about the mission. He also claimed Barber had been willing to share the half credit for shooting down Yamamoto until Lanphier had given him an unpublished manuscript he had written, claiming he alone had shot down Yamamoto's plane. Canning agreed that Barber had a strong case for his claim citing the testimony of Yanagiya who saw Yamamoto's "Betty" crash 20 to 30 seconds after being hit from behind by fire from a P-38. Likewise, the second Betty carrying Ugaki crashed 20 seconds after being struck by aircraft fire. Canning stated categorically that the P-38Gs flown that day did not have aileron boost to assist in turning (as did later models), making it physically impossible for Lanphier's aircraft to have made the 180 degree turn fast enough to intercept Yamamoto's plane in less than 30 seconds. The Air Force later disqualified Lanphier's claim for shooting down a Zero in the battle, meaning that Lanphier lost his "ace" status as his total number of air-to-air kills dropped from five to four.

In spite of criticism from Barber and other surviving pilots from the mission, Lanphier continued to claim credit for downing Yamamoto until his death in 1987. Most newspaper obituaries reporting Lanphier's death credited him with killing Yamamoto. Barber continued to contest Lanphier's claim, mainly in military circles and publications, until his death in 2001.

Lieutenant Julius Jacobson, another pilot on the mission, remarked in 1997, "There were 15 of us who survived, and as far as who did the effective shooting, who cares?" Rice commented in 1993, "Historians, fighter pilots and all of us who have studied the record of this extraordinary mission will forever speculate as to the exact events of that day in 1943. There is glory for the whole team."

== Legacy ==
The Yamamoto killing has been the subject of extensive historical and legal discussion in military, political and academic circles.

Following the 2020 killing of Iranian general Qasem Soleimani, the Yamamoto killing was cited by senior U.S. officials as a precedent. Various major media and noted pundits also singled out the Yamamoto killing as the relevant comparison, including The New York Times, who reported that the Yamamoto killing was "the last time the United States killed a major military leader in a foreign country" prior to the Soleimani killing.

== See also ==
- Killing of Osama bin Laden
- Barisha raid
