= Miyoshi Nabeta =

- 鍋田 美吉
- Died: 2 February 1944; Kwajalein Atoll, Marshall Islands
- Military career
- Allegiance: Empire of Japan
- Branch: Imperial Japanese Navy Air Service (IJN)
- Rank: Lieutenant Commander
- Units: Kanoya Air Group; Kisarazu Air Group; 707th Air Group; 24th Air Flotilla
- Conflicts: World War II; Sinking of Prince of Wales and Repulse; Guadalcanal Campaign; New Guinea Campaign; Battle of Kwajalein

Miyoshi Nabeta (鍋田 美吉, Nabeta Miyoshi; died 2 February 1944) was a medium bomber pilot officer in the Imperial Japanese Navy (IJN) during World War II. He led a successful torpedo attack on the battleship Prince of Wales. Later he was the leader of the Kisarazu Air Group during Guadalcanal Campaign and New Guinea Campaign and commanded Rabaul-based medium bombers in various battles in 1942. He was killed in ground combat during the Battle of Kwajalein on 2 February 1944.

== Early career ==
Miyoshi Nabeta graduated from merchant marine college. In January 1934, he became Reserve Ensign and entered a reserve pilot training program of the navy, where he specialized in medium bomber aircraft. On 1 August 1934, he was transferred from reserve officer rank to regular officer rank.

== Pacific War ==
On 10 December 1941, Lieutenant Miyoshi Nabeta participated in the Sinking of Prince of Wales and Repulse off the south-east coast of Malay Peninsula. He led a division of torpedo-armed Mitsubishi G4M medium bombers from Kanoya Air Group and scored three torpedo hits on the battleship Prince of Wales.

Lieutenant Nabeta became the leader (Hikōtaichō) of the Kisarazu Air Group. On 20 August 1942, he led 19 G4M bombers to Kavieng on New Britain to participate in the Guadalcanal Campaign. His first mission was on 25 August when he led a formation of 23 bombers from Kisarazu, Misawa and 4th Air Group to attack Henderson Field on Guadalcanal. On 30 August, he led a formation of 18 bombers from Kisarazu and Misawa to make a level-bombing attack on Allied shipping near Guadalcanal, which sank the destroyer Colhoun. On 2 September, he again led a raid on Henderson Field with 18 bombers from Kisarazu and Misawa. By now he suffered no losses, however, in another raid with 26 bombers on 10 September, he lost two bombers to intercepting US Marine Grumman F4F Wildcat fighters.

On 12 September, Lieutenant Nabeta led a combined raid of 26 bombers from Kisarazu, Misawa and Chitose Air Group on Henderson Field. This time his formation was ambushed by a large force of 28 Wildcats led by Major John Smith and Lieutenant Commander Leroy Simpler and he lost six bombers. On 27 September, he led 18 bombers from Kisarazu and Takao in a very successful attack on Henderson Field that resulted in the destruction of five Douglas SBD dive bombers and five Grumman TBF torpedo bombers on the ground, and also damaged six Wildcat fighters. On 14 October, he led another attack of 26 bombers that cratered the airfield. During the raid on 18 October he lost three bombers out of 15 to intercepting Wildcat fighters. His last mission during the Guadalcanal Campaign took place on 25 October, where he led 16 bombers from Kisarazu and the 753rd Air Group on another raid against Henderson Field, during which he lost two bombers.

In 1943, Lieutenant Commander Nabeta became a staff officer of the 24th Air Flotilla and was posted on Roi in the Marshall Islands. On 2 February 1944, he was killed in ground combat when Allies landed on Roi.
