= Misawa Air Group =

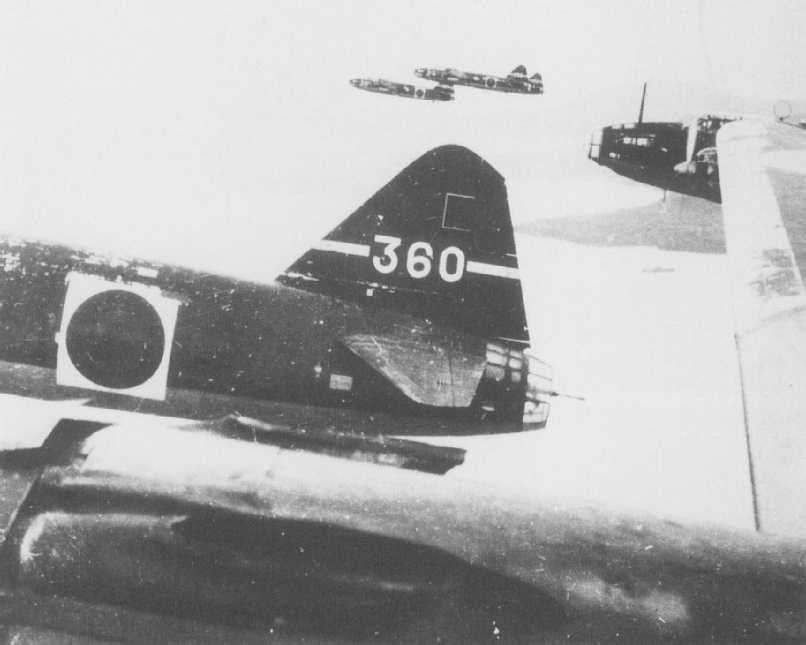
- Mitsubishi G4M1 of 705th Air Group in May 1943.
- Active: As Misawa Air Group; 10 February 1942–31 October 1942; 1 September 1944–30 June 1945; As 705th Air Group; 1 November 1942–1 October 1944
- Country: Empire of Japan
- Branch: (Empire of Japan) Imperial Japanese Navy
- Type: Naval aviation unit
- Role: First generation: Bomber; Second generation: Trainer
- Part of: Ōminato Guard District; 26th Air Flotilla; 25th Air Flotilla; 28th Air Flotilla; 19th Combined Air Group
- Garrison/HQ: Kisarazu, Japan; Saipan, Marianas; Rabaul, New Britain; Tinian, Marianas; Padang, Sumatra; Peleliu, Palau; Babeldaob, Palau; Misawa, Japan
- Aircraft flown: Mitsubishi G4M; Nakajima B5N; Yokosuka K5Y
- Engagements: World War II: Solomon Islands Campaign; New Guinea campaign; Guadalcanal Campaign; Operation Ke (Note: As 705th Air Group.); Battle of Rennell Island; Operation I-Go; Battle of the Philippine Sea; Burma Campaign

Commanders
- Notable commanders: Tomoo Nakamura

Insignia
- Identification symbol: As Misawa Air Group ミサ (Misa, used in Japan homeland); H (February–October 1942); As 705th Air Group; H (November 1942); T1 (June 1943); 705 (March 1944)

The Misawa Air Group (三澤海軍航空隊, Misawa Kaigun Kōkūtai) was an aircraft and airbase garrison unit of the Imperial Japanese Navy (IJN) during the Pacific campaign of World War II. This article covers first generation, second generation, renamed unit the 705th Air Group (第七〇五海軍航空隊, Dai Nana-Maru-Go Kaigun Kōkūtai), and re-organised unit the 706th Attack Squadron (攻撃第七〇六飛行隊, Kōgeki Dai Nana-Maru-Roku Hikōtai) also.

== First generation ==
=== History ===
The Misawa Air Group was established on 10 February 1942 in Misawa, Japan and operated Mitsubishi G4M medium bombers. After the Allied landing on Guadalcanal and Tulagi on 7 August, the unit was dispatched to Rabaul on New Britain and was assigned to 26th Air Flotilla. First, Lieutenant Hiromi Ikeda (group's Buntaichō) brought nine G4M medium bombers in late afternoon on 7 August. The next day, the remaining 18 G4M medium bombers were brought by Lieutenant Tomoo Nakamura (group's Hikōtaichō). With them came also Vice Admiral Nishizō Tsukahara, the commander of the 11th Air Fleet. The unit first saw action on 8 August, when Lieutenant Ikeda's nine medium bombers joined 17 from 4th Air Group led by Lieutenant Shigeru Kotani, in order to make a torpedo attack on Allied shipping around Guadalcanal and Tulagi. The attack was a disaster since only five bombers made it back to Rabaul, while the rest were shot down by a combination of intense AA fire from Rear Admiral Richmond K. Turner's ships and intercepting Grumman F4F Wildcat fighters from Rear Admiral Frank J. Fletcher's carriers. Among those killed in action were also the leaders Kotani and Ikeda. In return, they only managed to put one torpedo in the destroyer Jarvis, in addition to damaging one transport when one damaged bomber rammed it. The following day, 9 August, Lieutenant Nakamura led 17 torpedo-armed bombers from Misawa Air Group to search for the enemy carriers. He could not locate the carriers and settled on attacking and sinking the damaged Jarvis that was leaving the area.

The air group conducted frequent missions against Guadalcanal throughout August. On occasions, the focus was shifted to New Guinea. For example, on 17 August, Lieutenant Nakamura led 25 bombers to attack Port Moresby. The attack was relatively successful since they managed to destroy several aircraft on the ground. On 26 August, Lieutenant Nakamura led 17 bombers from Misawa and Kisarazu Air Group to attack recently finished Henderson Field on Guadalcanal. They managed to destroy 2,000 gallons of aviation fuel and damage several aircraft on the ground. Almost daily raids against Guadalcanal were carried out by the bombers of Misawa Air Group in the first half of September, where Lieutenants Nakamura, Rinji Morita and Yūsaburō Nonaka exchanged in leading the unit's formations within the larger strikes composed of Misawa, Kisarazu and Chitose Air Group. The second half of September brought frequent bad weather and attacks against Guadalcanal were temporarily suspended and the attention was again shifted to New Guinea, when Misawa bombers participated in an attack on Port Moresby on 21 September.

The weather improved at the end of the month and operations against Guadalcanal resumed. On 28 September, Lieutenant Morita led a combined strike of 27 bombers from Misawa, Takao Air Group, Kanoya Air Group against Guadalcanal. Even though they were escorted by 14 Mitsubishi A6M Zero fighters from Tainan Air Group and additional 27 from 6th Air Group led by Lieutenant Mitsugi Kofukuda, most of the fighters failed to engage the intercepting 35 US Marine and Navy Wildcat fighters, which resulted in the loss of Morita command bomber and four more Takao bombers. After these significant losses of medium bombers, the command at Rabaul decided to temporarily change the tactics, where the bombers only served as a decoy and turned around before reaching Guadalcanal, while the fighters went ahead alone to surprise the defending enemy fighters. In accordance with this new tactic, nine Misawa bombers acted as a decoy on 2 October, while in the resulting air combat Lieutenant Kofukuda's Zero fighters shot down six Wildcat fighters and two Douglas SBD Dauntless dive bombers for the loss of only one Zero.

The strikes by medium bombers resumed on 11 October, when Misawa under Reserve Lieutenant (jg) Nobuyoshi Takamura contributed nine medium bombers to the largest single strike in the Guadalcanal campaign, which was composed of 45 bombers in total. Nevertheless, due to bad weather, the result was disappointing since most of the bombers could not find the target. From 11 to 14 October Rabaul was sending two bomber raids per day, where Misawa contributed bombers (either led by Nonaka or Takamura) to at least one of the raid per day. From 15 October onward, they shifted back to one raid against Guadalcanal per day and Misawa continued to contribute bombers to these raids throughout the rest of October.

On 1 November, Misawa Air Group was redesignated to 705th Air Group. On 11 November, newly promoted Lieutenant Commander Nakamura led 16 torpedo-armed bombers against the enemy ships around Guadalcanal. They were intercepted by 16 Wildcat and eight Bell P-39 Airacobra fighters and in combination with AA fire from the ships, they shot down 11 medium bombers, while the rest returned severely damaged. This put an end to further raids by medium bombers against Guadalcanal. On 29 January 1943, 705th Air Group was involved in the Battle of Rennell Island. Lieutenant Commander Nakamura led 16 torpedo-armed bombers against the enemy ships spotted near Rennell Island. They scored no hits and in return lost one bomber, however, subsequent attacks by other air groups managed to sink the cruiser Chicago. On 12 April, the unit participated in Operation I-Go, where Lieutenant Commander Nakamura led 27 bombers against Port Moresby. Two days later, they also participated in a raid against Milne Bay. The unit continued to be involved in the Solomon Islands campaign until 5 September, when it was withdrawn to Tinian.

=== Structure ===
- Higher unit
  - Ōminato Guard District (10 February 1942–31 March 1942)
  - 26th Air Flotilla (1 April 1942–31 August 1943
    - Renamed 705th Air Group on 1 November 1942.
  - 25th Air Flotilla (1 September 1943–14 October 1943)
  - 28th Air Flotilla (15 October 1943–1 October 1944, dissolved.)
    - All land-based attack bombers were independent to the 706th Attack Squadron on 4 March 1944.
- Commanding officers
  - Commander/Captain Masao Sugawara (10 February 1942–9 December 1942)
  - Captain Yasuo Konishi (10 December 1942–23 May 1944)
  - Captain Tarōhachi Shinoda (24 May 1944–1 October 1944, dissolved.)

== Second generation ==
Reborn as the preparatory flight training unit (Yokaren).

=== Structure ===
- Higher unit
  - 19th Combined Air Group (1 September 1944–1 March 1945)
  - Ōminato Guard District (1 March 1945–30 June 1945, dissolved.)
- Commanding officers
  - Commander Takeo Higo (1 September 1944–29 September 1944)
  - Captain Shōgo Miyashita (29 September 1944–30 June 1945, dissolved.)

== 706th Attack Squadron ==
=== Structure ===
- Higher unit
  - 755th Air Group (4 March 1944–10 July 1944, dissolved.)
- Squadron leader
  - Lieutenant commander Fumio Iwaya (4 March 1944–10 July 1944, dissolved.)
