= Eleventh Fleet (disambiguation) =

Eleventh Fleet or 11th fleet may refer to:

- United States Eleventh Fleet
- 11th Air Fleet (Imperial Japanese Navy)

== See also ==
- Tenth Fleet (disambiguation)
- Twelfth Fleet (disambiguation)
