= Kenji Yanagiya =

Japanese pilot

- 柳谷 謙治
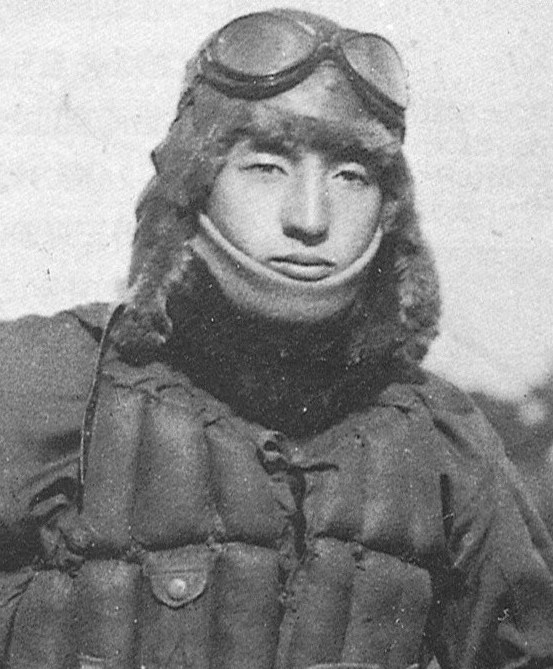
- Kenji Yanagiya at Rabaul
- Born: March 1919; Hokkaidō, Japan
- Died: February 29, 2008 (aged 88); Tokyo, Japan
- Military career
- Allegiance: Empire of Japan
- Branch: (Empire of Japan) Imperial Japanese Navy Air Service (IJN)
- Service years: 1940–1945
- Rank: Warrant Officer
- Units: Kisarazu Naval Air Force, the 6th Naval Air Group, the 204th Naval Air Group
- Conflicts: World War II; Pacific War; Operation Vengeance

Warrant Officer Kenji Yanagiya (柳谷 謙治, Yanagiya Kenji; March 1919 – February 29, 2008) was a member of the Imperial Japanese Navy's Zero fighter aces who fought the Battle of Solomon Islands in October 1942 – June 1943. He is best known as the only escort fighter pilot of the Yamamoto mission to have survived the war.

== Early life ==
Born on Hokkaidō, he moved with his family at his age of two and grew up at Tomarioru prairie in Karafuto (Sakhalin).

== World War II service ==
He enlisted in the Imperial Japanese Navy (IJN) on January 10, 1940, as an aircraft mechanic. He was then selected as a Hei-shu Hiko Yoka Renshu Sei (C-class Flight Reserve Trainee), a course for seamen and non-commissioned officers already in the navy. He completed his pilot training course in March 1942. He then became a Flyer / 1st Class fighter pilot with the 6th Kokutai at Kisarazu Air Base. Yanagiya arrived at Rabaul on October 7, 1942, as a member of 6th Kokutai, which was under the 26th Air Flotilla in the South East Division Air Fleet (including the 11th Air Fleet). The group was renamed the 204th Kokutai the following month.

He was one of the escort fighter pilots of Fleet Admiral Yamamoto's visit to Ballale Base on April 18, 1943. After Yamamoto's death, he was injured and lost his right hand on a subsequent mission to Russell Islands, near Guadalcanal, in June 1943, for which he was sent back to the home islands for treatment and recovery.

=== The six escort fighter pilots afterward ===
Yanagiya and his fellow pilots were neither accused nor criticized. Yanagiya was promoted to Petty Officer 2nd Class on May 1 as scheduled previously. The 204th Air Group commander and his staff officers knew that it was very difficult to protect two Mitsubishi G4M bombers from 16 Allied fighters with only six escort fighters. The six pilots, however, thought themselves responsible for the incident so seriously that they charged themselves to shoot down as many Allied airplanes as possible.

On June 7, 1943, the 204th Air Group at Buin base planned an operation to bomb Allied Russell Islands airfield with 81 fighters. Twelve Zeros, armed with firebombs beneath each wing, in three sets of "Lotte" formations approached at an altitude of 8000 m, while other Zero groups escorted. The reinforced fifty Allied fighters adopted new formation tactics, splitting into groups with ten fighters per group. A furious battle resulted between the Zeros and the fifty Allied fighters. Over the airfield, Yanagiya's group dived from 8,000 m (26,000 ft) to 6,000 m (20,000 ft), released their firebombs then pulled up.

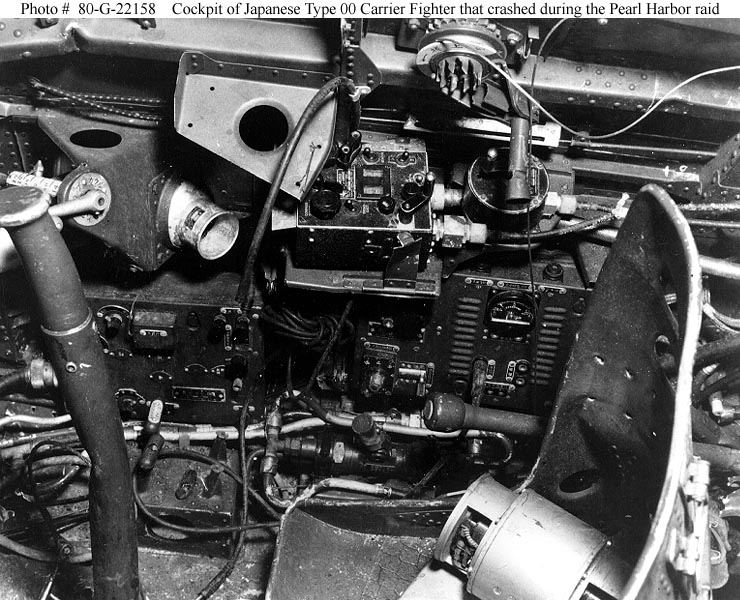
A stick and right side levers of a Zero fighter cockpit.

Petty Officer 2nd Class Yanagiya was caught in the tail position by two F4Fs and received bursts of gunfire. Most of his right hand was shot off, with only his little finger remaining attached to his wrist. He was also shot in the right leg. He thereafter controlled the plane with his left hand and flew back to the IJN Munda airstrip on New Georgia Island. During the return flight, with his right leather boot filling with blood from his leg wound and near fainting from the blood loss, he repeatedly shouted in a loud voice to keep himself awake. He was unable to operate levers on the starboard side of the cockpit to deploy flaps or landing gear, but managed to safely land on the airstrip. Imperial Japanese Marine soldiers took him out of the cockpit, and a doctor operated immediately, cutting the remainder of his right hand off at the wrist.

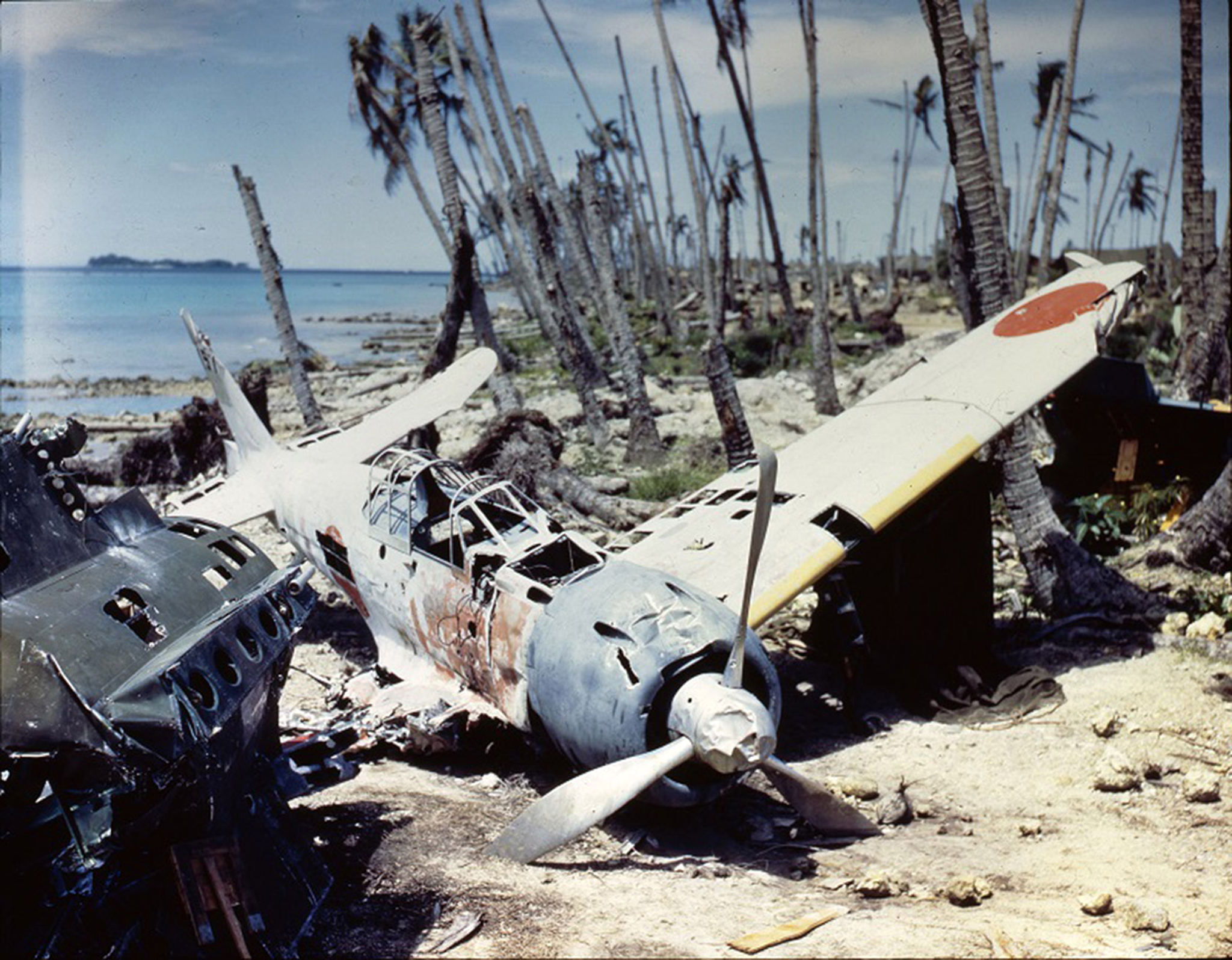
Abandoned A6M3 Zero fighter abandoned at Munda Airfield in the Solomon Islands, 1943

Chief Petty Officer Yoshimi Hidaka and Petty Officer 1st Class Yasushi Okazaki both died in the action. Petty Officer 2nd Class Kameji Yamane was missing in action. Yanagiya lost his right hand and was hospitalized. These four pilots all flew Zero fighters armed with heavy bombs beneath each wing on the mission that day. The Zeros of the 204th Air Group claimed 13 Allied aircraft shot down that day.

On June 16, a Japanese scout aircraft found a large group of Allied transports off shore Lunga point, Guadalcanal. The 204th Air Group at Buin base all attacked in full power. The 204th Air Group fighter squadron leader Lieutenant Zenjiro Miyano and Lieutenant (JG) Morisaki died in the action.

On July 1, the remaining 204th Air Group struck the Allied anchorage at Rendova Island. Chief Petty Officer Toyomitsu Tsujinoue was on duty to escort dive-bombers and went missing in action.

Young Flyer 1st Class Shoichi Sugita kept fighting wildly and survived the Battle of Solomon Islands in 1943, but he was killed in action at the age of 20 in April 1945. In August 1943, he was shot down in flames and bailed out. He was seriously injured and returned to homeland Japan alive. In March 1944, Petty Officer 2nd Class Sugita came back as a member of the 263rd Air Group at Guam. But the units were seriously damaged by three days of sorties. In June, the 263rd Air Group members were merged with the 201st Air Group (2nd generation) in the Philippines, which was reorganized as the first Kamikaze Corps by the 1st Air Fleet (2nd generation) Commander in Chief, Vice Admiral Takijiro Onishi. Many younger aviators had been ordered to fly Kamikaze sorties daily. Sugita finally threatened Captain Sakae Yamamoto, the commander of the 201st Air Group, with his gun to get an order of Kamikaze sorties for him first. He was ordered to return to Japan. In January 1945, Petty Officer 1st Class Sugita joined the 301st fighting squadron of the 343rd Air Group. He was finally shot down and killed in action while taking off from Kanoya Airfield in Kyūshū, Japan, in a Kawanishi N1K-J Shidenkai (Allied codename George) in April 1945.

Five out of the six fighter pilots died. Yanagiya alone survived the war.

=== His record ===
Yanagiya was credited with eight victories. In addition, he was credited with eighteen shared victories, where fighter pilots were fully credited for 'shared' victories (if pilots shot down one aircraft, all pilots were credited a victory as 'shared') by the IJN Air Force. This was based on the traditional and orthodox standard adopted by the Royal Navy, the Royal Air Force (RAF) and the Armée de l'Air (ALA) in World War I, up until World War II. His flight hours were about 500 hours in June 1943.

A part of Yanagiya's flight log in April 1943, from his war-time flight log notebook page
Date	ID code of his Zero Fighter	Flight hours	Count	Sub-total	Mission
Apr.3 (Sat.)	T2-187	1:30	1	1:00	Unit formation training
Apr.7 (Wed.)	T2-129	6:00	2 (Operation X)	7:30	Attack Lunga point, Guadalcanal
Apr.7 (Wed.)	T2-129	1:00	3	8:30	****
Apr.8 (Thur.)	T2-117	1:00	4	9:30	****
Apr.9 (Fri.)	T2-169	2:00	5 & 6	11:30	Test flights in high-altitude capability
Apr.11(Sun.)	T2-165	1:00	7	12:30	Unit formation training
Apr.12(Mon.)	T2-169	6:00	8 (Operation Y)	18:30	Attack Port Moresby, escorting Rikko unit
Apr.14(Wed.)	T2-169	5:30	9 (Operation Y1)	24:00	Attack Rabi (Milne Bay airfield, New Guinea), escorting Rikko unit
Apr.18(Sun.)	T2-169	2:15	10	26:15	Escorting Rikkos (Adm. Yamamoto)
Apr.18(Sun.)	T2-169	1:45	11	28:00	Buin -> Rabaul

His missions monthly sub-total and total flight hours at the end of April 1943
	Count	Flight hours
Monthly sub-total	27	65hrs 00mins
Total	493	429hrs 40mins

== Post-war ==
He thought the result of the Yamamoto mission was to his shame and nothing to be proud of. He kept silent until a non-fiction writer, Akira Yoshimura, interviewed him thirty years later in the mid-1970s.

In 1988, he was invited to the Admiral Nimitz museum in Texas to meet the American pilots of the Yamamoto Raid, where he shook hands with his former opponents and received applause from the American audience.

Yanagiya died on February 29, 2008, at age of 88.
