= Masafumi Arima =

Japanese admiral (1895–1944)

- 有馬 正文
- Arima c. 1940
- Born: 25 September 1895; Hioki, Kagoshima, Japan
- Died: 15 October 1944 (aged 49) between Taiwan and the Philippines
- Military career
- Allegiance: Empire of Japan
- Branch: Imperial Japanese Navy
- Service years: 1915–1944
- Rank: Vice Admiral (posthumous)
- Commands: Kamikawa Maru, Sasebo Naval Air Group, Kisarazu Naval Air Group, Yokohama Naval Air Group, Shōkaku, 26th Air Flotilla
- Conflicts: World War II; Pacific War; Guadalcanal campaign; Battle of the Eastern Solomons; Battle of the Santa Cruz Islands; Naval Battle of Guadalcanal; Aerial Battle of Taiwan-Okinawa †

Masafumi Arima (有馬 正文, Arima Masafumi; 25 September 1895 – 15 October 1944) was an admiral in the Imperial Japanese Navy in World War II. An experienced aviator, he is sometimes credited with being the first to use the kamikaze attack, although official accounts may have been invented for propaganda purposes. Arima personally led an air attack against United States Navy Task Force 38 in the Formosa Air Battle and was killed in action.

== Biography ==
Arima was born in Ijuin village (present day Hioki city), Kagoshima prefecture. He graduated from the 43rd class of the Imperial Japanese Naval Academy in 1915. He was ranked 33rd in a class of 96 cadets. As a midshipman, he was assigned to the cruiser Iwate on its 1915 long distance navigational training voyage from Sasebo to Chemulpo, Dairen, Chinkai, Maizuru and Toba. He stayed with Iwate on its cruise the following year to Hong Kong, Singapore, Fremantle, Melbourne, Sydney, Wellington, Auckland, Jaluit Atoll, Ponape, and Truk. On his return, he was commissioned as an ensign assigned to the battleship Shikishima.

As a lieutenant, he subsequently served on the destroyer Uzuki, battleship Suwo and Kongō, destroyer Ashi, cruiser Izumo, and battleship Hiei. He returned to school, graduating from the 26th class of Naval War College (Japan) in 1928 and was promoted to lieutenant commander. After serving as chief gunnery officer on the battleship Haruna and the cruiser Asama, Arima received his first command on 1 December 1937, the converted seaplane tender Kamikawa Maru. He was also promoted to captain the same day.

Arima oversaw several naval air force bases in Japan from 1938–1942, and was then posted as captain of the aircraft carrier Shōkaku on 25 May 1942. While on Shōkaku, he was in the Guadalcanal campaign, the Battle of the Eastern Solomons, the Battle of the Santa Cruz Islands, and the Naval Battle of Guadalcanal.

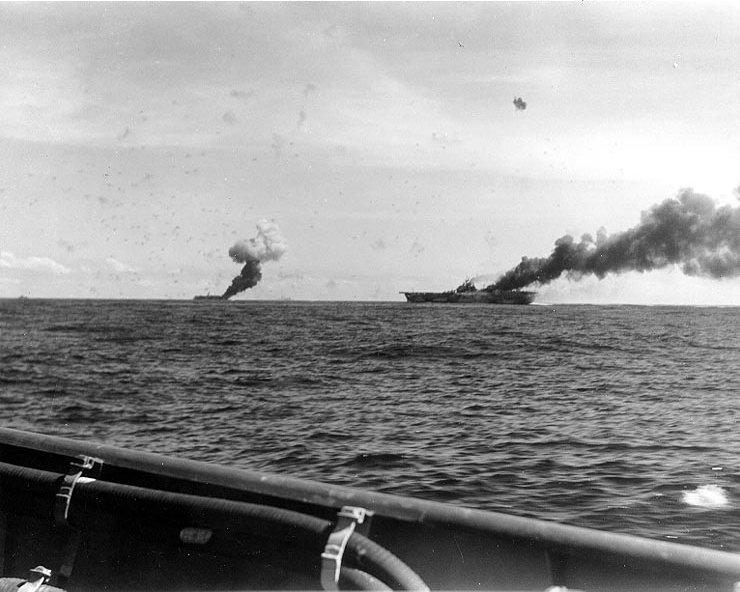
Belleau Wood (left) and Franklin hit by kamikazes, 30 October 1944

Arima was promoted to rear admiral on 1 May 1943. He was given a combat command on 9 April 1944, and was assigned the 26th Air Flotilla, based at Clark Air Base, on Luzon, in the Philippines. After the Battle of Leyte Gulf, at some date between 13 October and 26 October (accounts vary), Arima personally led an air attack against U.S. Navy Task Force 38 in the Aerial Battle of Taiwan-Okinawa. Before taking off in a Mitsubishi G4M "Betty" twin-engine bomber, he allegedly removed his rank and other insignia, and declared his intention to not return alive. Although Arima indeed did not return, and some damage was caused to the Essex-class aircraft carrier USS Franklin, it is not clear that the damage was from a planned suicide attack, and some accounts state that none of Arima's formation reached their targets. However, this may have been a propaganda fabrication after the event.

Another source claims that the first kamikaze attack happened a month earlier. On 12 September 1944, a group of Army pilots of the 31st Fighter Squadron located on Negros Island decided to launch a suicide attack the following morning. First Lieutenant Takeshi Kosai and another sergeant were selected. Strapping two 100 kg (220 lb) bombs onto two fighters, they took off on 13 September before dawn, determined to crash into aircraft carriers. They never returned, but there is no record of an enemy plane hitting an American ship on that day.

In the aftermath of the battle, however, Arima was officially credited by the Imperial Japanese Navy with introducing the use of the kamikaze attack, and he was publicized as a hero in the government-controlled Japanese press.

Arima was posthumously promoted to vice admiral. His cenotaph is at the temple of Kozai-ji in his home town of Hioki, Kagoshima.

== Notable positions held ==
- Secondary Gunnery Officer, Haruna - 10 December 1928 – 5 September 1929
- Senior Staff Officer, Battleship Division 3 – 15 November 1932 – 20 May 1933
- Senior Staff Officer, Cruiser Division 7 – 20 May 1933 – 15 November 1934
- Senior Staff Officer, Cruiser Division 10 – 12 July 1937 – 20 October 1937
- Senior Staff Officer, Cruiser Division 14 – 20 October 1937 – 1 December 1937
- Commanding Officer, Kamikawa Maru - 1 December 1937 – 1 September 1938
- Commanding Officer, Sasebo Air Group - 1 September 1938 - 15 December 1938
- Commanding Officer, Kisarazu Air Group - 15 December 1938 - 15 November 1939
- Commanding Officer, Yokohama Air Group - 15 November 1939 - 17 April 1941
- Executive Officer & Chief Instructor, Yokosuka Air Group - 17 April 1941 - 10 May 1942
- Commanding Officer, Shokaku - 17 May 1942 – 16 February 1943
- Commander-in-Chief, 26th Air Flotilla - 9 April 1944 - 15 October 1944 (KIA)

== Dates of promotions ==
- Midshipman - 16 December 1915
- Ensign - 1 December 1916
- Sublieutenant - 1 December 1918
- Lieutenant - 1 December 1921
- Lieutenant Commander - 1 December 1927
- Commander - 15 November 1933
- Captain - 1 December 1937
- Rear Admiral - 1 May 1943
- Vice Admiral - 15 October 1944 (posthumous promotion)
