= Robert C. Giffen =

United States Navy admiral, college athletics administrator

Robert Carlisle Giffen
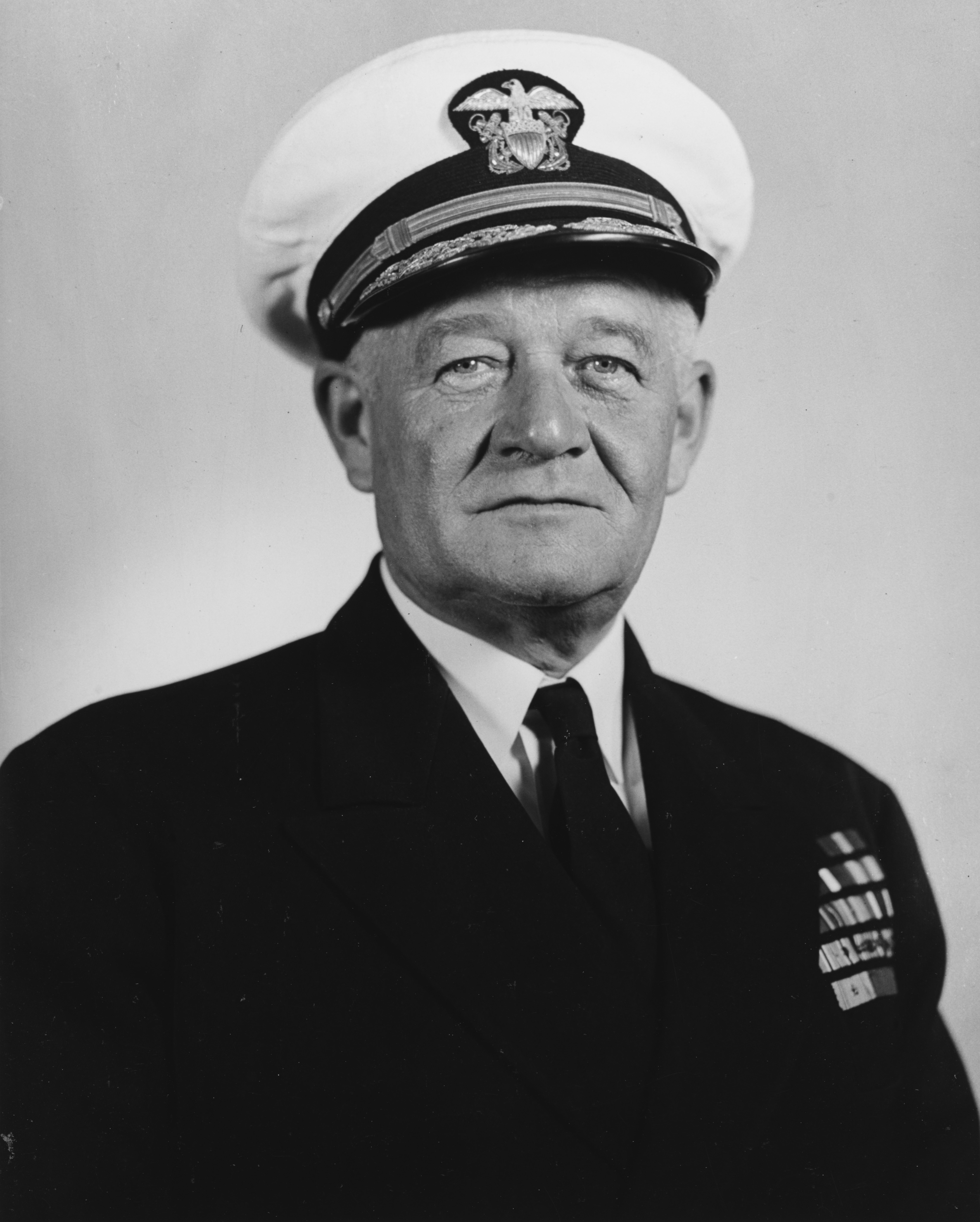
- Vice Admiral Robert C. Giffen. Official U.S. Navy photograph.
- Born: 29 June 1886; West Chester, Pennsylvania, U.S.
- Died: 10 December 1962 (aged 76); Annapolis, Maryland, U.S.
- Military career
- Allegiance: United States
- Branch: United States Navy
- Service years: 1907 – 1946
- Rank: Vice Admiral
- Conflicts: World War I World War II: Operation Torch; Battle of Rennell Island; Aleutian Islands campaign; Gilbert and Marshall Islands campaign
- Awards: Navy Cross; Navy Distinguished Service Medal

Robert Carlisle Giffen (1886 – 1962) was an admiral in the United States Navy.

== Birth to the beginning of World War I ==
Robert Carlisle Giffen was born in West Chester, Pennsylvania, on 29 June 1886. He attended the University of Notre Dame, in South Bend, Indiana, before appointment to the U.S. Naval Academy from the State of Nebraska in 1903. Midshipman Giffen graduated with the Academy's class of 1907 and was assigned to the battleship USS Virginia, in which he voyaged around the world with the "Great White Fleet" between late 1907 and early 1909. During the next four years, Giffen served in several ships and also participated regularly in the National Rifle Matches. Lieutenant (Junior Grade) Giffen served at the Washington Navy Yard in 1913–15 and was then assigned to the new destroyer USS Wainwright.

== World War I and inter-war years ==
During 1917–1918, Lieutenant Commander Giffen commanded the destroyer USS Trippe in European waters and served with the Sixth Battle Squadron, attached to the British Grand Fleet in the North Sea. In mid-1918 he took command of the new destroyer USS Schley, serving in her at Gibraltar and in the Mediterranean Sea until August 1919. From then until the middle 1930s he had shore duty at San Francisco, California, at the Naval Academy and at Keyport, Washington; served afloat as executive officer of USS Huron; and was commanding officer of the gunboat USS Sacramento, a destroyer squadron and the oiler USS Neches. Between 1934 and 1937, Captain Giffen was again stationed at the Naval Academy, followed by a tour in command of the light cruiser USS Savannah in 1938–1940.

== World War II ==
=== Atlantic service ===
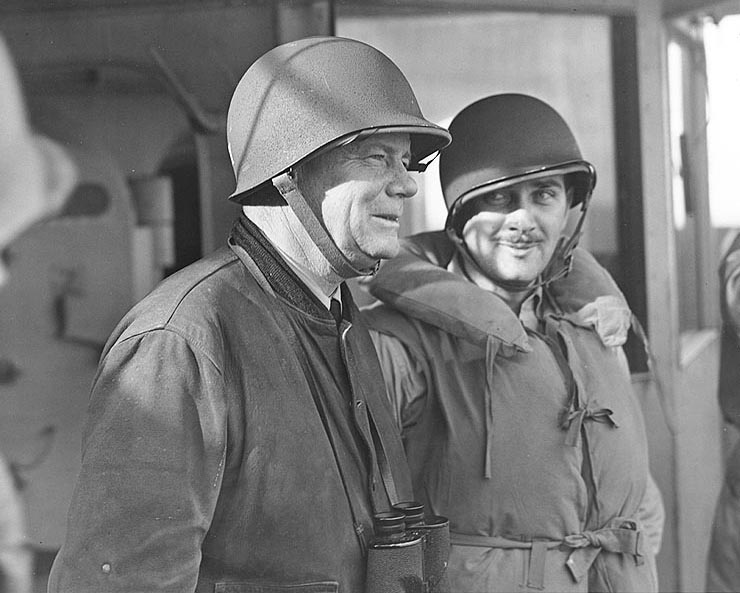
Rear Admiral Robert C. Giffen wearing a battle helmet while on board ship, sometime during 1942–1943.

Giffen attended the Naval War College in 1940 and spent several months in Washington, D.C., as Director of the Naval Reserve Policy Division of the Office of the Chief of Naval Operations.

In March 1941, Rear Admiral Giffen became commander of a cruiser division. He led the North Atlantic Neutrality Patrol on increasingly "warlike" operations during the latter part of 1941. Once war formally began for the United States in December, he commanded surface forces that escorted convoys and, at times, operated with the British Home Fleet. On 27 March 1942 he was named commander of US Navy Atlantic Task Force 39 when its commander, Rear Adm. John W. Wilcox, Jr., was lost at sea. In November 1942, he participated in the North Africa invasion, during which his task force actively engaged French warships and aircraft off Casablanca, Morocco.

=== Pacific and Caribbean service ===
During 1943 and into 1944, Rear Admiral Giffen commanded battleship and cruiser task forces in the Pacific, participating in the latter stages of the fight for Guadalcanal (and was the losing commander in the Battle of Rennell Island), the Aleutians campaign, the invasions of the Gilbert and Marshall Islands, and raids against Japanese bases in the central Pacific. In May 1944, with the rank of vice admiral, he became Commandant of the Tenth Naval District and Commander, Caribbean Sea Frontier, with headquarters at San Juan, Puerto Rico from 14 May 1944 until 20 August 1945.

== Final career assignments and retirement ==
Vice Admiral Giffen was Commander Service Force, U.S. Atlantic Fleet, from August 1945, and retired from active duty at the beginning of September 1946.

He died at Annapolis, Maryland on 10 December 1962.
