= Operation I-Go =

WWII Japanese aerial counter-offensive in the Solomon Islands and New Guinea Campaigns

- Part of the Pacific Theater of World War II
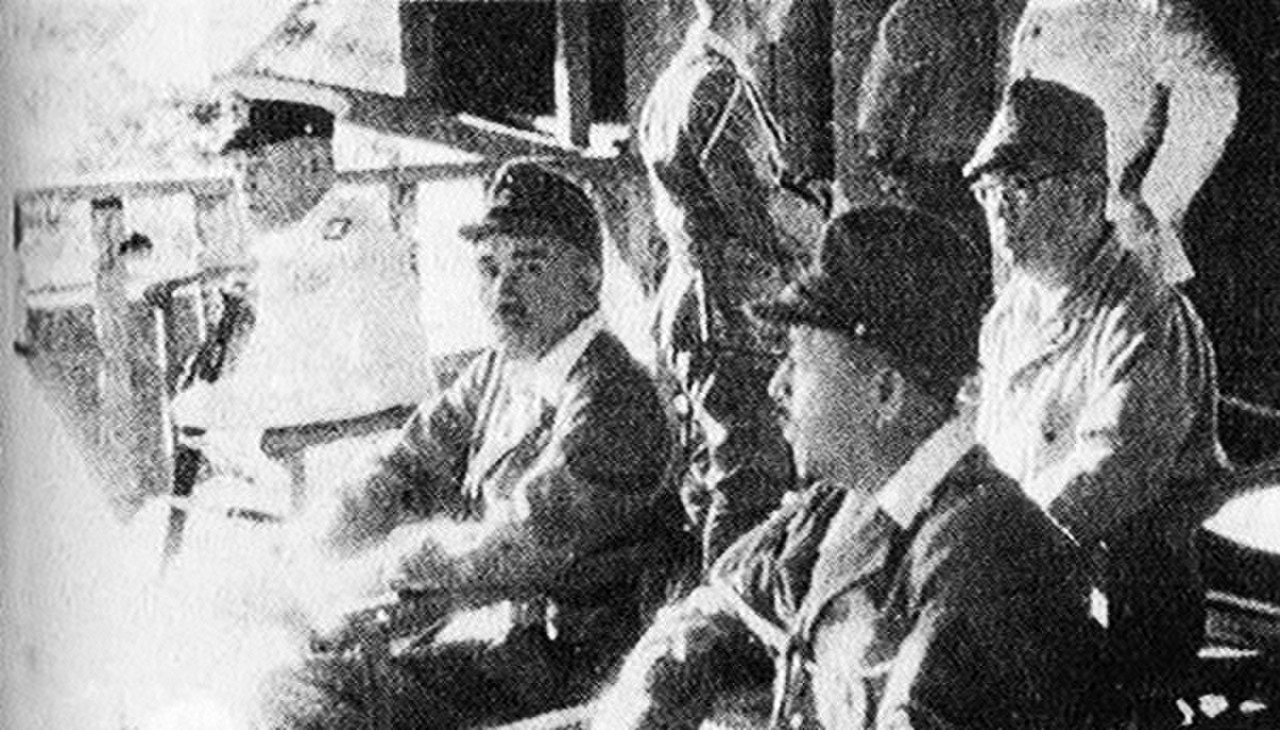
- Isoroku Yamamoto (far left) and Jinichi Kusaka (center left) supervise air operations from Rabaul during Operation I-Go in April 1943
Date	1–16 April 1943
Location	New Britain, Solomon Islands, and New Guinea
Result	Inconclusive

Belligerents
United States; Australia; New Zealand	Empire of Japan

Commanders and leaders
William Halsey; Douglas MacArthur	(Empire of Japan) Isoroku Yamamoto (Empire of Japan) Jinichi Kusaka

Strength
	350 aircraft

Casualties and losses
1 destroyer, 1 tanker, 2 transports, 1 corvette sunk, 25 aircraft destroyed	55 aircraft destroyed

Operation I-Go (い号作戦, I-Go sakusen) was an aerial counter-offensive launched by Imperial Japanese forces against Allied forces during the Solomon Islands and New Guinea campaigns in the Pacific Theater of World War II. Taking place from 1–16 April 1943, Japanese aircraft—primarily from Imperial Japanese Navy units under the command of Admirals Isoroku Yamamoto and Jinichi Kusaka—attacked Allied ships, aircraft, and land installations in the southeast Solomon Islands and New Guinea. The goal of the operation was to halt the Allied offensives to give Japan time to prepare a new set of defenses in response to recent defeats in the Guadalcanal campaign and in New Guinea at Buna–Gona, Wau, and the Bismarck Sea.

The operation consisted of several massed aerial attacks by Japanese bomber and fighter aircraft—based at Rabaul, Bougainville, and the Shortland Islands—against Allied targets on and around Guadalcanal and the Russell Islands in the Solomons and Port Moresby, Oro Bay, and Milne Bay in New Guinea. Although the Japanese sank several Allied transports and warships, the attack failed to inflict serious damage. Based on inaccurate and unintentionally exaggerated reports from the involved aircrews, Yamamoto halted the attacks on 16 April, believing the operation to be a success. The operation did not significantly delay Allied preparations for further offensives in the South Pacific. Yamamoto was killed shortly thereafter while traveling to congratulate units that had participated in the operation.

== Background ==
Following the Guadalcanal campaign, as well as setbacks at Buna–Gona and Wau, the Japanese sought to delay the Allied advance in the Central Pacific while they strengthened their forces in the South Pacific. In early March 1943, the Japanese suffered heavy losses at the hands of Allied aircraft during the Battle of the Bismarck Sea. In light of this, the Imperial Japanese Army (IJA) and Navy (IJN) decided to change their strategy in the region and bring in reinforcements for their air assets in the region. On 15 March the Japanese high command in Tokyo issued orders for a new defensive strategy in the Central Pacific, based upon building a strong perimeter around their base at Rabaul. The campaign in the Solomons would be placed on hiatus while the main focus of their operations shifted towards New Guinea. In order to set the conditions for this strategy, the Japanese planned a short air offensive in the Solomon Islands and New Guinea focused upon four key locations: Guadalcanal, Oro Bay, Port Moresby and Milne Bay. The Japanese designated this Operation 'A', or Operation I Go Sakusen, as 'I' is the first letter of the classical iroha lexicographic ordering. Allied forces in the Pacific at the time were commanded by General Douglas MacArthur (South West Pacific Area) and Admiral William Halsey (South Pacific Area).

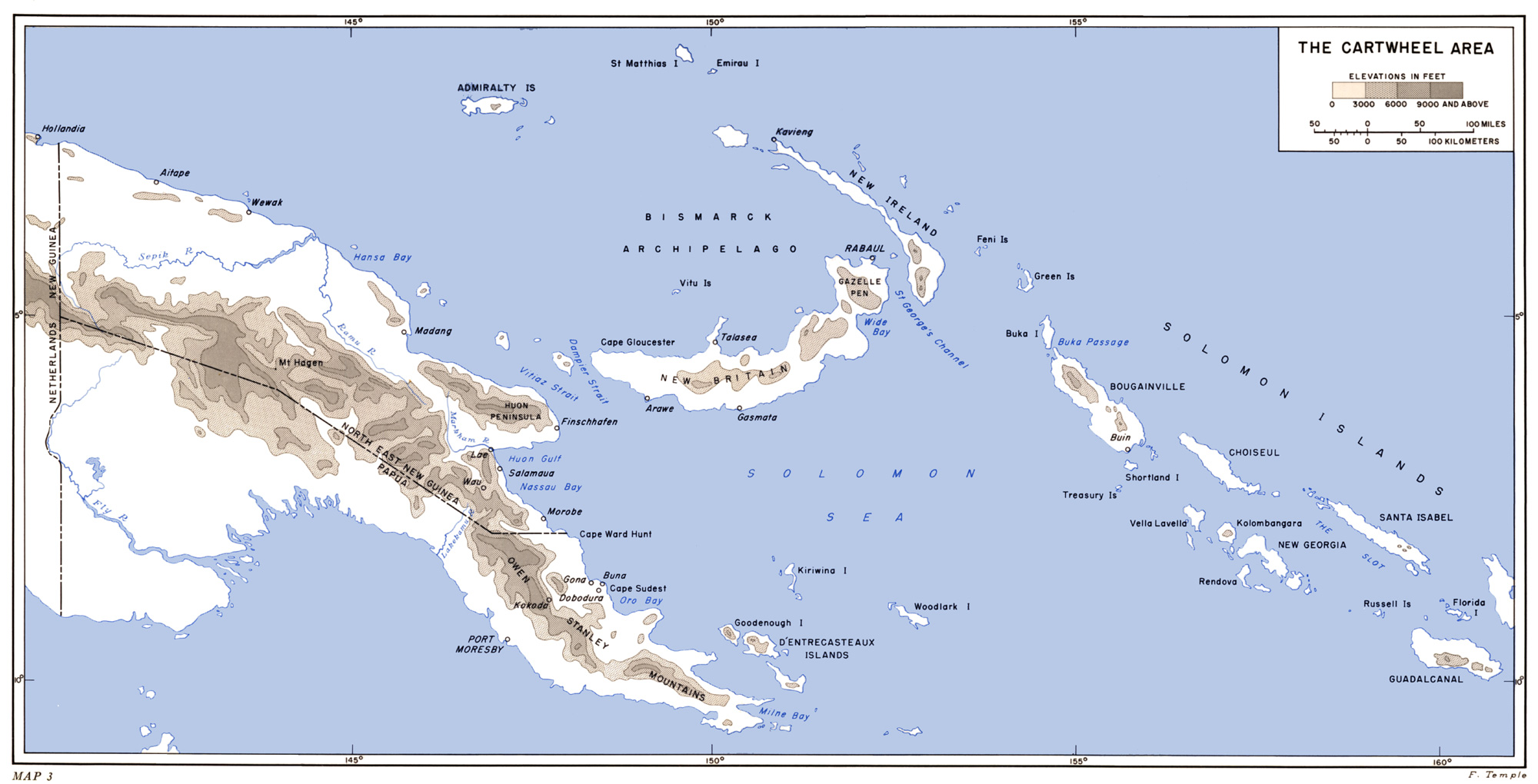
Solomon Islands and New Guinea

Responsibility for the operation was given to the air fleet of the IJN. Throughout March, Admirals Isoroku Yamamoto and Jinichi Kusaka established their headquarters in Rabaul and began planning the offensive. Preliminary planning determined that the offensive would be undertaken in two phases, with the first effort concentrating on the Solomon Islands. They subsequently began building up air power around Rabaul, concentrating aircraft from the land-based aircraft of the 11th Air Fleet along with aircraft from the Third Fleet's four aircraft carriers, Zuikaku, Zuiho, Junyo and Hiyo. The carrier-based aviation units contributed over 160 aircraft, including 96 fighters, while the 11th Air Fleet provided 86 fighters, as well as 72 medium bombers, 27 dive bombers and a few torpedo bombers. After initially concentrating around Rabaul these aircraft were dispersed to several fields around Buka and Kahili on Bougainville, and at Ballale in the Shortland Islands.

By briefly boosting the Japanese air force at Rabaul with naval carrier aircraft, Yamamoto gathered almost 350 planes together to achieve formidable striking power with the intention of countering Allied air power and defences over several days at various critical locations. Overall, it was to become their most substantial aerial assault undertaken in the area. Operational losses over the preceding months left many of the Japanese crews with inexperienced servicemen. Allied air defenses in the area were predominately provided by U.S. fighter squadrons, reinforced by several Australian units. In April, New Zealand fighter squadron No. 15 Squadron RNZAF was deployed to Guadalcanal, reinforcing the New Zealand bomber/reconnaissance squadron that had deployed to the area in late 1942.

== Air attacks ==
Allied reconnaissance aircraft detected increased Japanese air activity around the upper Solomons on 1 April 1943. That day, as a preliminary part of the operation a fighter sweep of 58 Mitsubishi A6M3 Zeros was dispatched to draw out Allied fighters defending the area and destroy them ahead of the main aerial assault. The Japanese fighter sweep was met by 41 Allied fighters, consisting of a variety of types including Wildcats, Corsairs and Lightnings from Rear Admiral Charles P. Mason's AirSols command. The Japanese aircraft were intercepted over the Russell Islands while they were en route to Tulagi and Guadalcanal. The aerial battle that followed claimed 18 Zeros at the cost of six Allied aircraft. In the days that followed the carrier-based aircraft began arriving at Rabaul from Truk in preparation to begin the air strikes of the offensive. Some elements were delayed by low clouds, and a few of the Japanese aircraft did not arrive at Ballale until early on 7 April.

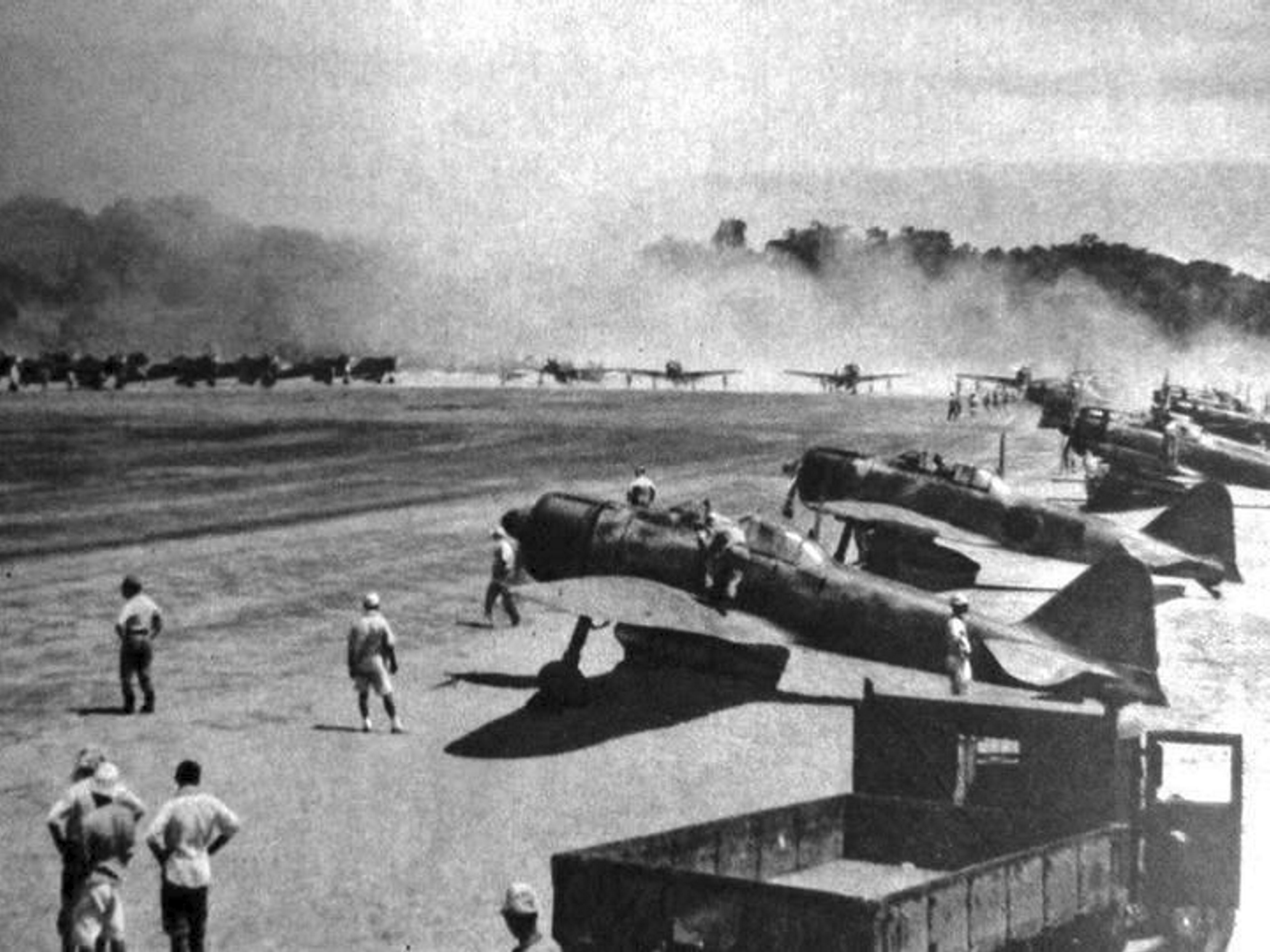
Japanese aircraft at Rabaul

The first attack of the Japanese offensive was launched on 7 April against Guadalcanal. This was the largest raid of the operation and consisted of 67 Aichi D3A2 "Val" dive bombers escorted by 110 Zeros and was met by 76 Allied fighters. The raiding aircraft were organized into six elements: two fighter sweeps preceded four waves of dive bombers. The first fighter sweep, consisting of aircraft from the 253rd Kokutai, departed Ballale around midday under the command of Saburo Saito. It was followed by the second sweep consisting of aircraft from the 204th Kokutai. The four waves of dive bombers were drawn from the carriers Zuikaku, Zuiho, Hiyo and Junyo. Twenty-one Japanese aircraft were lost; the Allies lost seven. The raid resulted in the sinking of the destroyer USS Aaron Ward, the corvette HMNZS Moa, and the tanker USS Kanawha.

Nevertheless, the Allies were able to evacuate their bombers from Henderson Field so that they escaped damage. The main Allied air assets came from the US Thirteenth Air Force and included a variety of aircraft including Wildcats, Lightnings and Airacobras. Australian aircraft from No. 77 Squadron RAAF, based out of Gurney Field at Milne Bay, took part in the Allied response. Flying Kittyhawk fighters, one of their pilots, Flying Officer John Hodgkinson, was responsible for downing one of the Japanese fighters. One US Marine Corps pilot, Lieutenant James E. Swett, was later awarded the Medal of Honor after shooting down seven aircraft.

A three-day lull followed before the Japanese launched their second strike. On 11 April, a force of 22 "Vals" and 72 Zeros attacked shipping at Oro Bay, near Buna. A total of 50 Allied fighters scrambled from Dobodura and intercepted the force, shooting down six aircraft without loss. The Allied squadrons committed to the fight included the 7th, 8th and 9th Fighter Squadrons flying Lightnings and Warhawks. These aircraft were controlled by a radar station which attempted to guide the defending fighters into position but initially misdirected some of them to Cape Sudest. Anti-aircraft fire from ships in the bay also contributed to the defense, and ultimately only limited damage was inflicted on one Allied merchantman.

An attack on Port Moresby took place on 12 April. A force of 131 Zeros of the 253rd Kōkūtai and air groups of the carriers Zuikaku and Zuihō and 43 Mitsubishi G4M2 "Betty" medium bombers of the 751st and 705th Kōkūtai was assigned to the airstrike. Their targets were the aircraft dispersed at the five airfields located around the town and the transports in the harbor. The raid was detected by the radar station at Paga Hill 38 minutes prior to their arrival, allowing the Allies time to scramble their fighters. Opposed by 44 Allied fighters, mainly from the US 39th, 40th and 41st Fighter Squadrons, the attack resulted in two Allied and five Japanese aircraft lost. The Japanese bombers were able to penetrate the Allied fighter screen which was outnumbered by their Japanese rivals, and they were able to damage a few small craft in the harbor. They also damaged or destroyed several aircraft on the Port Moresby airfields. Losses on the ground included three Mitchell medium bombers and an Australian Beaufort. No large ships were damaged in the attack.

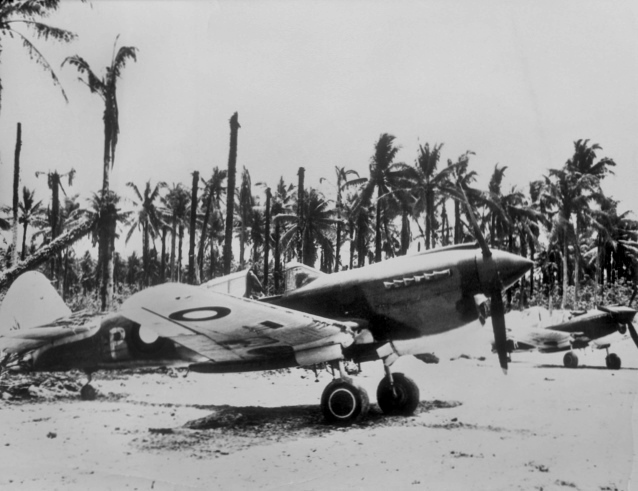
Kittyhawk fighter aircraft of No. 77 Squadron RAAF at Milne Bay

On 14 April the Japanese air offensive was nearing its conclusion when they launched an attack against Milne Bay, where three Dutch troop transports (Van Heemskerk, Van Outhoorn and Balikpapan) were anchored, having been re-routed there from Port Moresby after the earlier raid. Receiving advanced warning of the attack, the Australian harbor master, Commander Geoffrey Branson, ordered the vessels to disperse. The raid involved 188 aircraft from the 705th and 751st Kokutais as well as the carriers Hiyo and Junyo. Eight Lightnings from the U.S. 9th Fighter Squadron scrambled from Dobodura, resulting in seven Japanese and three U.S. aircraft being shot down. Between 24 and 36 Royal Australian Air Force Kittyhawks from No. 75 and 77 Squadrons also intercepted the attacking force.

Author Ian Shaw notes that the Milne Bay "area had a low cloud base for most of the year and the nearby mountains could make flying a dangerous proposition". The experiences of one Australian pilot during the raid highlight these dangers and were captured in an official report in the National Archives of Australia. Just after midday, Pilot Officer Norman Houghton was flying as part of a flight of five aircraft, inbound towards Samarai. He observed a close formation of about 30 Japanese bombers slightly right of his heading. The Japanese escort consisted of two elements, one of seven fighters above and behind bombers, the other of between seven and eight fighters, which were about 2,000 feet (610 m) above them to the north. As the Australian fighter aircraft attempted to engage, Norman turned too tight at 150 miles (240 km) per hour and his aircraft went into a spin. After recovering, he experienced engine trouble and eventually he crash landed on a reef on Sideia Island near the village of Gotai.

The Japanese bombers attacked in several waves. Initially, high level bombers dropped at least one hundred bombs on the anchorage. These were followed half an hour later by dive bombers. As a result of the raid on Milne Bay, Van Heemskerk was beached after being hit by several bombs, which set it ablaze. The British cargo ship Gorgon was also bombed and set on fire, before the blaze was extinguished. Near misses damaged Van Outhoorn and the Australian minesweepers HMAS Wagga and Kapunda. Four Allied servicemen and 12 merchant seamen were killed in the air raid, while 68 were injured. Meanwhile, overhead, a significant air battle took place, during which both Australian squadrons shot down five aircraft each. This represented the highest number of aerial victories for the RAAF in a single day in the Pacific. The U.S. Lightning pilots also shot down two Japanese aircraft.

== Aftermath ==
Yamamoto concluded the operation on 16 April. At the time, he believed that Allied losses were heavier than they actually were and that the operation had been successful, and the Japanese carrier-based aircraft subsequently returned to their ships. Japanese claims amounted to 175 aircraft shot down and 28 ships sunk, including one cruiser and two destroyers. In reality, total Allied losses during the operation amounted to five ships of various types and up to 25 aircraft. The Japanese lost 55 aircraft destroyed. In the wake of the operation, Yamamoto decided to travel to the Solomons to congratulate his aircrews. He was subsequently killed on 18 April when the aircraft he was flying in was intercepted and shot down during Operation Vengeance.

The Japanese operation did not significantly delay Allied preparations for further offensives in the South Pacific Area, although U.S. operations in the Solomons were set back about 10 days with bombing and minelaying sorties being postponed to hold back aircraft to respond if further Japanese air strikes were launched. According to author George Odgers, after the raids in April "Japanese air activity in New Guinea...tapered off". Nevertheless, a few raids continued in the area until 30 June when the Allies launched an offensive in the Solomon Islands and New Guinea. This action was designated Operation Chronicle and was focused on the Woodlark and Kiriwina Islands; it formed part of the wider Operation Cartwheel. In assessing the operation, Samuel Morison writes "faulty intelligence, dispersal of effort and...failure to follow up" resulted in the failure of the Japanese operation.
