= Twelfth Fleet (disambiguation) =

Twelfth Fleet or 12th fleet may refer to:

- United States Twelfth Fleet
- 12th Air Fleet (Imperial Japanese Navy)

== See also ==
- Eleventh Fleet (disambiguation)
