= Battle of Rennell Island =

1943 battle in the Pacific during World War II

Coordinates: 11°25′S 160°56′E

- Part of the Guadalcanal campaign of the Pacific Theater of World War II
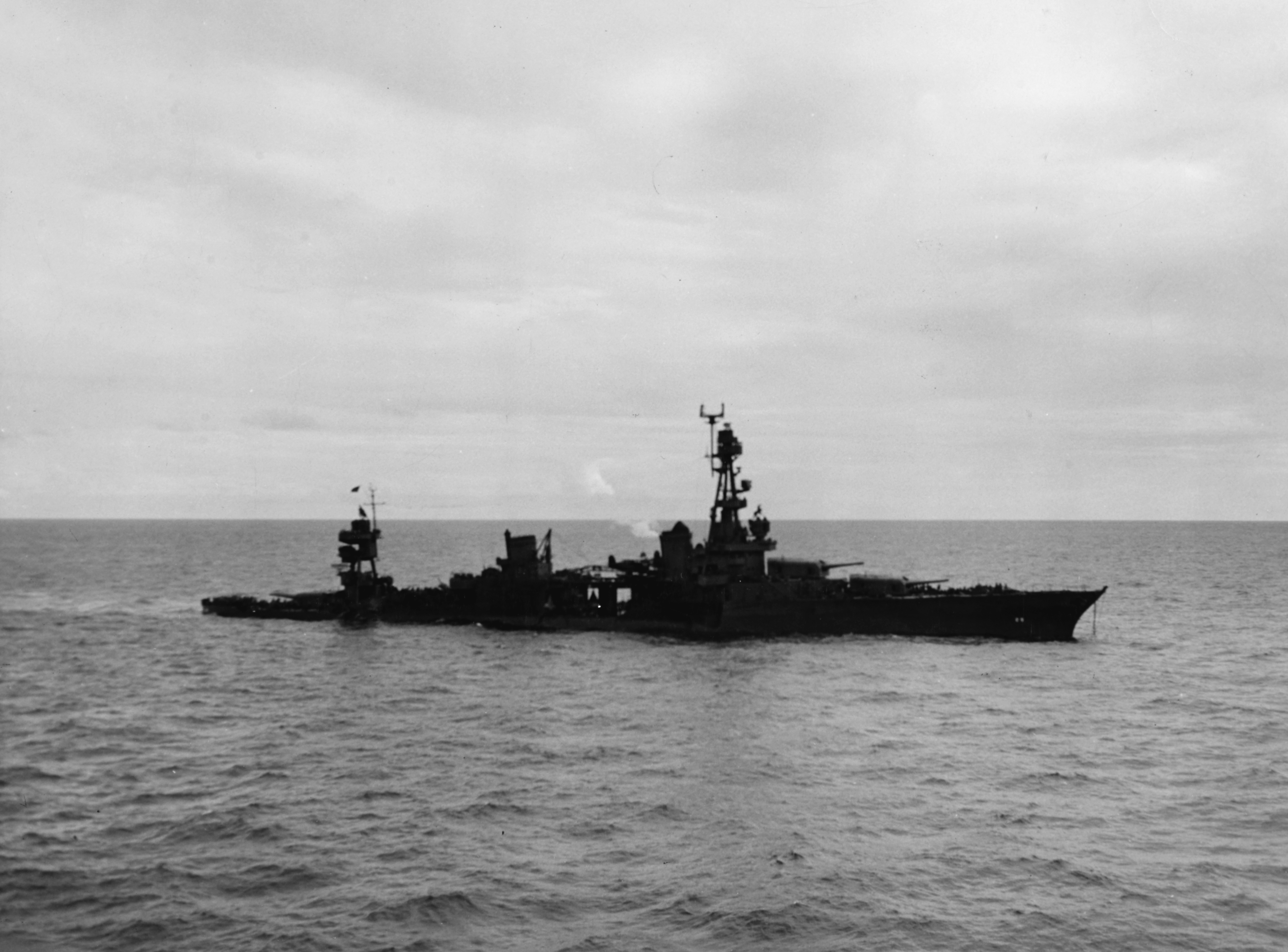
- USS Chicago low in the water on the morning of 30 January 1943, from torpedo damage inflicted the night before
Date	29–30 January 1943
Location	Rennell Island, Solomon Islands, Pacific Ocean
Result	Japanese victory

Belligerents
United States	Japan

Commanders and leaders
William Halsey Jr. Robert C. Giffen	Jinichi Kusaka; Rinosuke Ichimaru; Seigō Yamagata

Strength
1 aircraft carrier 2 escort carriers 3 heavy cruisers 3 light cruisers 8 destroyers 14 fighters	43 medium bombers

Casualties and losses
1 heavy cruiser sunk 1 destroyer heavily damaged 85 killed	12 medium bombers destroyed 60–84 killed

The Battle of Rennell Island (Japanese: レンネル島沖海戦, Hepburn: Renneru-shima oki kaisen) took place on 29–30 January 1943. It was the last major naval engagement between the United States Navy and the Imperial Japanese Navy during the Guadalcanal campaign of World War II. It occurred in the South Pacific between Rennell Island and Guadalcanal in the southern Solomon Islands.

In the battle, Japanese land-based torpedo bombers, seeking to provide protection for the impending evacuation of Japanese forces from Guadalcanal, made several attacks over two days on U.S. warships operating as a task force south of Rennell Island. In addition to approaching Guadalcanal with the objective of engaging any Japanese ships that might come into range, the U.S. task force was protecting an Allied transport ship convoy carrying replacement troops there.

As a result of the Japanese air attacks on the task force, the heavy cruiser USS Chicago was sunk, the destroyer USS La Vallette was heavily damaged, and the rest of the U.S. task force was forced to retreat from the southern Solomons area. Partly because they turned back the U.S. task force in this battle, the Japanese successfully evacuated their remaining troops from Guadalcanal by 7 February 1943, leaving it in the hands of the Allies and ending the battle for the island.

== Background ==
On 7 August 1942, Allied forces, consisting primarily of U.S. troops, landed on Guadalcanal, Tulagi, and the Florida Islands in the Solomon Islands. The landings on the islands were meant to deny their use by the Japanese as bases for threatening the supply routes between the U.S. and Australia, and to secure the islands as starting points for a campaign with the eventual goal of isolating the major Japanese base at Rabaul while also supporting the Allied New Guinea campaign. The landings initiated the six-month-long Guadalcanal campaign.

The last major attempt by the Japanese to drive Allied forces from Guadalcanal and Tulagi was defeated during the decisive Naval Battle of Guadalcanal in early November 1942. Thereafter, the Japanese Navy was able to deliver only subsistence supplies and a few replacement troops to Japanese Army forces on Guadalcanal. Because of the threat from Allied aircraft based at Henderson Field on Guadalcanal, plus nearby U.S. aircraft carriers, the Japanese delivered these supplies at night, usually by destroyer or submarine, in operations the Allies called the "Tokyo Express." These supplies and replacements were not enough to sustain Japanese troops on the island, who by 7 December 1942, were losing about 50 men each day from malnutrition, disease, and Allied ground or air attacks. On 12 December 1942, the Japanese Navy proposed that Guadalcanal be abandoned. Despite initial opposition from Army leaders, who still hoped that Guadalcanal could eventually be retaken from the Allies, on 31 December 1942 the Imperial General Headquarters, with approval from the Emperor, agreed to evacuate all Japanese forces from the island and establish a new line of defense for the Solomons on New Georgia.

The evacuation was code-named Operation Ke (ケ号作戦), and was scheduled to begin on 14 January 1943. An important element in the plan was an air superiority campaign starting 28 January 1943, to inhibit Allied aircraft or warships from disrupting the final stage of the Ke operation, which was the actual evacuation of all Japanese troops from Guadalcanal.

South Pacific area in 1942–1943. The U.S. troop convoy and warship task forces heading towards Guadalcanal (upper center) on 29 January 1943, originated at the major Allied bases at Espiritu Santo and Efate (center right) and Nouméa (lower right). Headquarters for Japanese land-based aircraft in the Solomons area was at Rabaul (upper left).

Allied forces misinterpreted the Ke preparations as the beginning of another Japanese offensive to try to retake Guadalcanal. At the same time, Admiral William Halsey Jr., the Allied theatre commander, was under pressure from his superiors to complete the replacement of the 2nd Marine Regiment, which had been in combat on Guadalcanal since August, with fresh U.S. Army troops. Halsey hoped to take advantage of what he believed was an impending Japanese offensive to draw Japanese naval forces into a battle, while at the same time delivering the replacement Army troops to Guadalcanal. On 29 January 1943, Halsey sent five task forces toward the southern Solomons area to cover the relief convoy and to engage any Japanese naval forces that came into range. These five task forces included two fleet carriers, two escort carriers, three battleships, 12 cruisers, and 25 destroyers.

Leading this array of task forces was Task Group 62.8, the troop convoy of four transports and four destroyers. Ahead of the troop convoy, between Rennell Island and Guadalcanal, was Rear Admiral Robert C. Giffen's Task Force 18 (TF 18), a close support group of heavy cruisers USS Wichita, Chicago, and Louisville, light cruisers Montpelier, Cleveland, and Columbia; escort carriers Chenango and Suwannee; and eight destroyers. Giffen commanded TF 18 from Wichita. A fleet carrier task force—centered on the carrier Enterprise—steamed about 250 mi (220 nmi; 400 km) behind TG 62.8 and TF 18. The other fleet carrier and battleship task forces were about 150 mi (130 nmi; 240 km) farther back. Giffen, with Wichita and the two escort carriers, had just arrived in the Pacific after participating in Operation Torch in the North African Campaign. Also, Chicago had just arrived back in the South Pacific, after completing repairs from damage suffered during the Battle of Savo Island almost six months before.

== Battle ==
=== Prelude ===
In addition to protecting the troop convoy, TF 18 was charged with rendezvousing with a force of four U.S. destroyers, stationed at Tulagi, at 21:00 on 29 January in order to conduct a sweep up "The Slot" through New Georgia Sound north of Guadalcanal the next day to screen the unloading of the troop transports at Guadalcanal. The escort carriers, under Commodore Ben Wyatt, and travelling at 18 kn (21 mph; 33 km/h), were too slow to allow Giffen's force to make the scheduled rendezvous, so Giffen left the carriers behind with two destroyers at 14:00 and pushed on ahead at 24 kn (28 mph; 44 km/h). Wary of the threat from Japanese submarines, which Allied intelligence indicated were likely in the area, Giffen arranged his cruisers and destroyers for anti-submarine defense, not expecting an air attack. The cruisers were aligned in two columns, spaced 2,500 yd (2,300 m) apart. Wichita, Chicago, and Louisville, in that order, to starboard, and Montpelier, Cleveland, and Columbia to port. The six destroyers were in a semicircle 2 mi (1.7 nmi; 3.2 km) ahead of the cruiser columns.

Giffen's force was tracked by Japanese submarines, who reported its location and movement. Around mid-afternoon, based on the submarine reports, 16 Mitsubishi G4M Type 1 bombers from the 705 Air Group (Misawa Kōkūtai) and 16 Mitsubishi G3M Type 96 bombers from the 701 Air Group (Mihoro Kōkūtai) took off from Rabaul carrying torpedoes to attack Giffen's force. One G3M turned back with engine trouble, leaving 31 bombers in the attack force. The leader of the 705AG aircraft was Lieutenant Tomoo Nakamura and Lieutenant Commander Joji Hagai commanded the 701AG planes.

=== Action on 29 January ===
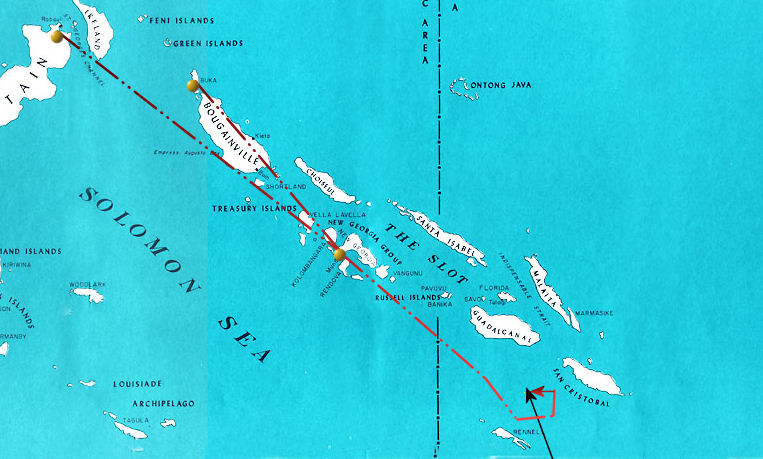
Chart of Japanese air attack (dashed red line) on U.S. Task Force 18 (solid black line) between Rennell Island and Guadalcanal on the evening of 29 January 1943

At sunset, as TF 18 headed northwest 50 mi (43 nmi; 80 km) north of Rennell Island and 160 mi (140 nmi; 260 km) south of Guadalcanal, several of Giffen's ships detected unidentified aircraft on radar 60 mi (52 nmi; 97 km) west of their formation. Having previously insisted on absolute radio silence, Giffen gave no orders about what to do about the unidentified contacts, or any orders at all, for that matter. With the setting of the sun, TF 18's combat air patrol (CAP) from the two escort carriers returned to their ships for the night, leaving Giffen's ships without air cover.

The radar contacts were the approaching Japanese torpedo bombers, who circled around to the south of TF 18 so that they could attack from the east, with the black backdrop of the eastern sky behind them. From this direction, the Japanese bombers were hidden by the night sky, but Giffen's ships were silhouetted against the twilight of the western horizon. The 705AG aircraft attacked first, beginning at 19:19. Nakamura's aircraft missed with all of their torpedoes and one was shot down by anti-aircraft fire from Giffen's ships.

Believing the attack was over, Giffen ordered his ships to cease zigzagging and continue towards Guadalcanal on the same course and at the same speed. Meanwhile, a Japanese reconnaissance aircraft began dropping flares and floatlights to mark the course and speed of TF 18 for the impending attack by Hagai's bombers.

At 19:38, 701AG attacked, hitting Chicago with two torpedoes, causing heavy damage and bringing the cruiser to a dead stop. Another torpedo hit Wichita but did not explode. Two bombers were shot down by anti-aircraft fire, including Hagai's; he was killed. At 20:08, Giffen ordered his ships to reverse direction, to slow to 15 kn (17 mph; 28 km/h) and to cease firing their anti-aircraft guns. The absence of muzzle flashes concealed the ships from the Japanese aircraft, who all departed the area by 23:35. In pitch darkness, Louisville managed to take the crippled Chicago under tow and slowly headed south, away from the battle area, escorted by the rest of TF 18.

=== Action on 30 January ===
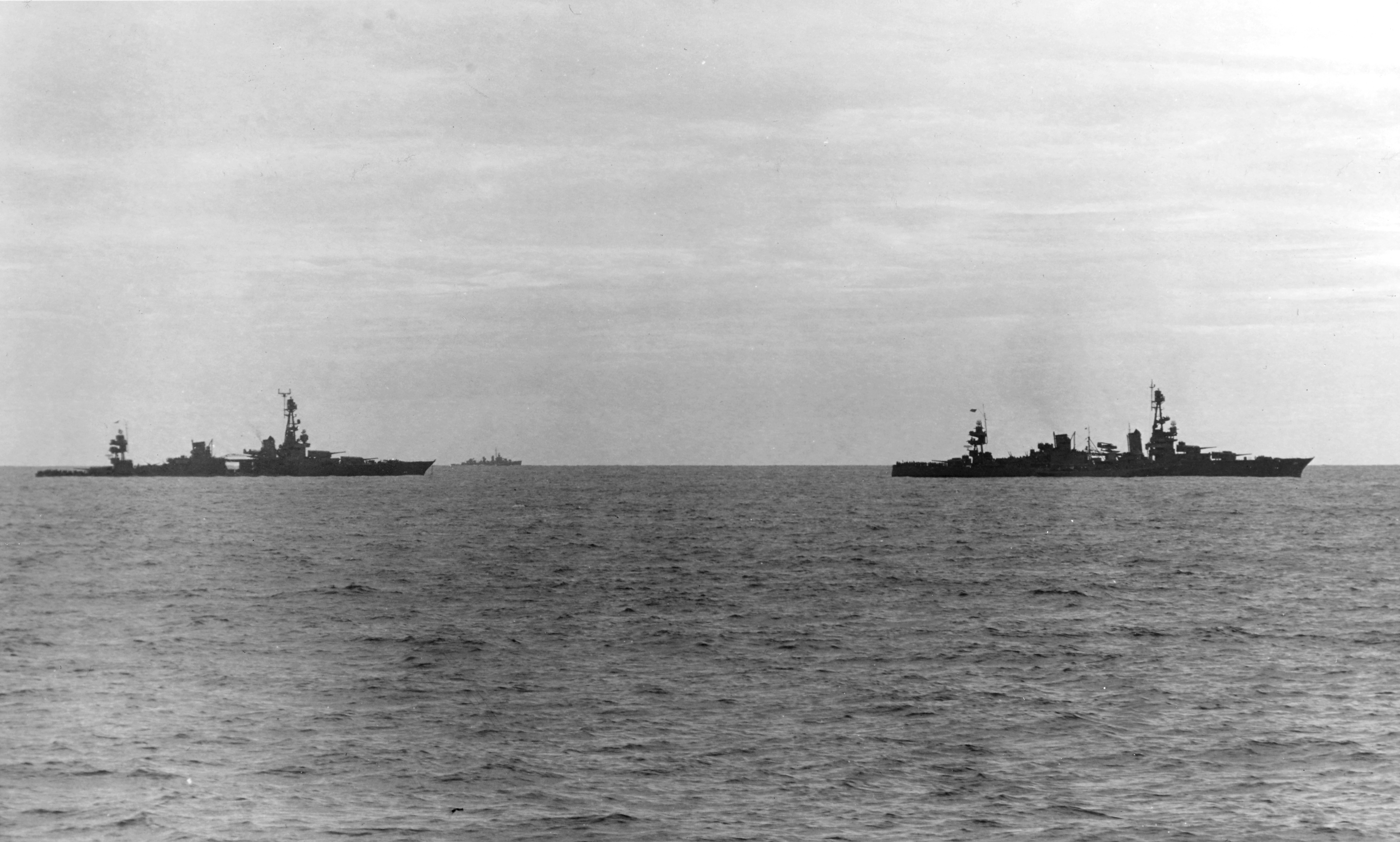
USS Louisville (right) tows the crippled Chicago on the morning of 30 January 1943.

Halsey immediately took steps to try to protect Chicago, notifying the escort carriers to make sure they had a CAP in place at first light, ordering the Enterprise task force to approach and to augment the escort carrier CAP, and sending the fleet tug Navajo to take over the tow from Louisville, which was achieved at 08:00. Between daybreak and 14:00, numerous Japanese scout aircraft approached TF 18. Although they were all chased away by the CAP, they observed and reported the position of Chicago. At 12:15, Lieutenant Commander Kazuo Nishioka led a force of 11 G4M torpedo bombers from the 751 Air Group (Kanoya Kōkūtai), based at Kavieng and staging through Buka, New Guinea, launched to attack the damaged U.S. cruiser. An Australian coastwatcher in the Solomon Islands warned the U.S. forces of the bombers and estimated their arrival time as 16:00. However, Halsey ordered the other cruisers to leave Chicago behind and head for Efate in the New Hebrides. They departed at 15:00, leaving behind six destroyers to protect Chicago and Navajo.

At 15:40, Enterprise was 43 mi (37 nmi; 69 km) away from Chicago, with ten of her fighters forming a CAP over the damaged cruiser. At this time, four of the CAP fighters chased and shot down a scouting G4M bomber. At 15:54, Enterprise's radar detected the incoming bombers and launched 10 more fighters. The escort carriers, however, had difficulties in getting their aircraft launched and their aircraft did not attack the bombers until the engagement was over.

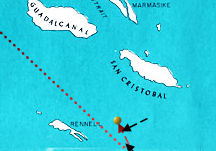
Japanese aerial attack (dotted red line) on Chicago (yellow dot) on the morning of 30 January 1943. Black arrows are U.S. carrier fighter aircraft.

At first, the Japanese bombers appeared to be trying to approach and attack Enterprise but turned toward Chicago after six Enterprise CAP fighters began to engage them. Four other CAP fighters chased the 751AG aircraft as they entered the anti-aircraft fire from Chicago's escorting destroyers. Two of the bombers were shot down before they could release their ordnance. Six more were shot down moments later, but not before they dropped their torpedoes.

One torpedo hit the destroyer USS La Vallette in her forward engine room, killing 22 of her crew and causing heavy damage. Chicago was hit by four torpedoes, one forward of the bridge and three others in her engineering spaces. Captain Ralph O. Davis of Chicago ordered the ship to be abandoned, and she sank, stern first, 20 minutes later. Navajo and the escorting destroyers rescued 1,049 survivors from Chicago, but 62 of her crew died. A final attack force of Japanese torpedo bombers failed to find the remaining U.S. ships. Navajo took La Vallette under tow, and all of the remaining ships of TF 18 made port at Espiritu Santo without further incident.

== Aftermath ==
The Japanese widely publicized the results of the engagement, claiming to have sunk a battleship and three cruisers. The U.S. on the other hand, tried to conceal the loss of Chicago from the public for some time, with Admiral Chester Nimitz threatening to "shoot" any of his staff who leaked the loss of Chicago to the press. Halsey and Nimitz blamed Giffen for the defeat and wrote this in Giffen's official performance report for the period. The defeat and resulting recriminations did not affect Giffen's career; he continued to lead Allied battleship and cruiser task forces in the Pacific until 1944 and was later promoted to vice admiral.

With Japanese aircraft engaged with TF 18, the Allied transports completed their mission of replacing the remaining marines on Guadalcanal over the last two days in January 1943. During this time, the other Allied task forces, including the two fleet carrier task forces, took station in the Coral Sea, in anticipation of an expected Japanese offensive in the southern Solomons.

With TF 18 forced to retreat, very few Allied naval forces were left in the immediate Guadalcanal area, allowing the Japanese to retrieve most of their remaining ground forces from Guadalcanal over three nights between 2 and 7 February 1943. This left any remaining Allied ships in the area highly exposed to Japanese attacks. Because the Allies believed that the Japanese were not evacuating, but actually sending in more reinforcements, U.S. destroyers and troop transports were proceeding with normal amphibious operations in western Guadalcanal despite losing the heavy firepower of TF 18. The destroyer De Haven was sunk by Japanese planes with 167 men killed and the destroyer Nicholas was slightly damaged and suffered two killed. Three PT boats, PT-37, PT-111, and PT-123, were sunk by Japanese forces on the same day as the sinking of De Haven with the loss of 15 sailors. The Allies were not aware of the Japanese withdrawal until it was over, but the evacuation of 11,000 starving troops and the loss of one cruiser became a footnote to the securing of Henderson Field and Guadalcanal, which provided the air support springboard to successfully complete the Solomon Islands campaign, a major turning point in the Pacific War.
