= Eighth Fleet (disambiguation) =

Eighth Fleet or 8th fleet may refer to:

- 8th Fleet (Imperial Japanese Navy)
- United States Eighth Fleet
- Baltic Fleet of the Soviet Navy

== See also ==
- Seventh Fleet (disambiguation)
- Ninth Fleet (disambiguation)
