= 26th Air Flotilla =

Unit of the Imperial Japanese Navy Air Service (IJNAS) during the Pacific War

- Active: 1 April 1942
- Country: Empire of Japan
- Branch: (Empire of Japan) Imperial Japanese Navy
- Type: Naval aviation unit
- Role: Bomber, Fighter, Dive Bomber
- Part of: 11th Air Fleet
- Garrison/HQ: Rabaul; Buin
- Engagements: Solomon Islands Campaign; New Guinea Campaign

Commanders
- Notable commanders: Yamagata Seigo; Masafumi Arima

The 26th Air Flotilla (第二六航空戦隊, Dai Nijūroku Kōkū Sentai) was a combat aviation unit of the Imperial Japanese Navy Air Service (IJNAS) during the Pacific Campaign of World War II.

== History ==
The 26th Air Flotilla was established on 1 April 1942 as a part of the 11th Air Fleet, and was originally composed of the Misawa Air Group and Kisarazu Air Group, both operating Mitsubishi G4M medium bombers. Under the command of Rear Admiral Seigo Yamagata, the unit was deployed to Rabaul on New Britain in August 1942 in order to reinforce the Japanese air power in the area and conduct operations in the New Guinea and Solomon Islands Campaigns. While being primarily a medium bomber unit, it eventually absorbed fighter (6th Air Group and Hiyō Air Group) and dive bomber (31st Air Group and 582nd Air Group) units too. The operational title for this hybrid organization was the 6th Air Attack Force. Due to vulnerability of G4M medium bombers, the unit took heavy losses in air combat over Guadalcanal.

== Organization ==
Date	Higher unit	Aviation units
1 April 1942 (original)	11th Air Fleet	Misawa Air Group, Kisarazu Air Group
12 September 1942	11th Air Fleet	Misawa Air Group, Kisarazu Air Group, 6th Air Group (detachment), Chitose Air Group (detachment)
10 October 1942	11th Air Fleet	Misawa Air Group, Kisarazu Air Group, 753rd Air Group (Note: Renamed Takao Air Group.) (detachment), 6th Air Group, 31st Air group
11 November 1942	11th Air Fleet	705th Air Group (Note: Renamed Misawa Air Group.), 707th Air Group (Note: Renamed Kisarazu Air Group.), 204th Air Group (Note: Renamed 6th Air Group.), 582nd Air Group (Note: Renamed 2nd Air Group.), 703rd Air Group (Note: Renamed Chitose Air Group.), 956th Air Group, Hiyō Air Group (detachment)

== Commanding officers ==
	Rank	Name	Date	Note
1	Rear Admiral	Seigo Yamagata	1 April 1942	
2	Rear Admiral	Kanae Kosaka	25 February 1943	
3	Rear Admiral / Vice Admiral	Munetaka Sakamaki	1 September 1943	Vice Admiral on 1 November 1943.
4	Rear Admiral	Masafumi Arima	9 April 1944	Vice Admiral (posthumous) on 15 October 1944.
x		vacant	15 October 1944	
5	Rear Admiral	Ushie Sugimoto	27 October 1944	Vice Admiral (posthumous) on 12 June 1945.
x		vacant	12 June 1945	
x		dissolved	15 August 1945	
