= Tenth Fleet (disambiguation) =

Tenth Fleet or 10th fleet may refer to:

- United States Tenth Fleet
- 10th Area Fleet (Imperial Japanese Navy)
- 10th Air Fleet (Imperial Japanese Navy)

== See also ==
- Ninth Fleet (disambiguation)
- Eleventh Fleet (disambiguation)
