= Ninth Fleet (disambiguation) =

Ninth Fleet or 9th fleet may refer to:

- United States Ninth Fleet
- 9th Fleet (Imperial Japanese Navy)

== See also ==
- Eighth Fleet (disambiguation)
- Tenth Fleet (disambiguation)
