= AirSols =

Aircraft, Solomons (AirSols)
- Active: April 1943 to June 1944
- Branch: Navy, Marines, Air Force
- Type: Air
- Part of: South Pacific Area

AirSols was a combined, joint command of Allied air units in the Solomon Islands campaign of World War II, from April 1943 to June 1944. It was subordinate to the Allied but U.S.-led Commander, South Pacific Area, itself part of Pacific Ocean Areas. AirSols superseded and absorbed the Cactus Air Force, which controlled Allied air units in the Solomons during 1942–43. AirSols was made up of United States Navy (USN), United States Marine Corps (USMC), the Royal New Zealand Air Force (RNZAF) and the Thirteenth Air Force, United States Army Air Forces (USAAF) forces.

The Allied fliers were opposed by the Japanese 11th Air Fleet and Fourth Air Army based at Rabaul in New Britain.

"Commander, Aircraft, Solomons" (ComAirSols) directed the combat operations of all land-based air forces in the Solomons during the major Allied offensive of 1943–44, Operation Cartwheel. Discussing the initial command structure of AirSols, Marine Corps historians Henry I. Shaw and Douglas T. Kane, wrote:

Rear Admiral Charles P. Mason was the first officer to hold the title ComAirSols; he assumed command on 15 February 1943 at Guadalcanal. Actually, Mason took over a going concern, as he relieved Brigadier General Francis P. Mulcahy, who had controlled all aircraft stationed at the island during the final phase of its defense. Mulcahy, who became Mason's chief of staff, was also Commanding General, 2nd Marine Aircraft Wing. The fact that a general headed the staff of an admiral is perhaps the best indication of the multiservice nature of AirSols operations. Since Mason brought only a few officers with him to help run the new command with its enlarged scope of activity, he kept Mulcahy's veteran staff. Experience, not rank, seniority, or service, determined the assignments. Vice Admiral Aubrey W. Fitch, as Commander, Aircraft, South Pacific (ComAirSoPac), was Admiral Mason's immediate superior.

On 15 June 1944, AirSols was replaced by AirNorSols (Air North Solomons), which would have 40 squadrons (including 23 USMC squadrons). That same day, responsibility for Allied units west of 159° East Longitude and south of the Equator passed from POA to the South West Pacific Area (SWPA). However, seven USAAF squadrons in AirNorSols were transferred, as part of the Thirteenth Air Force, to the U.S. Far East Air Forces (SWPA) and eight USN and RNZAF squadrons were moved to garrison duty in South Pacific.

== Subordinate units ==
=== USN ===
- VB-11
- VF-17

=== USMC ===
- 2nd Marine Aircraft Wing
  - Marine Aircraft Group 23
  - VMF-124
  - VMF-213
  - VMF-214
  - VMF-223

=== USAAF ===
- 18th Fighter Group
- 347th Fighter Group
- 4th Reconnaissance Group
- 5th Bombardment Group
- 42nd Bombardment Group
- 307th Bombardment Group
- 419th Night Fighter Squadron

=== RNZAF ===
- No. 1 (Islands) Group
  - No. 14 Squadron RNZAF
  - No. 15 Squadron RNZAF

== Commanders ==
- Rear Admiral Charles P. Mason, USN: February 15, 1943 - April 1, 1943
- Rear Admiral Marc A. Mitscher, USN: April 1, 1943 - July 25, 1943
- Brigadier General Nathan Twining, USAF: July 25, 1943 - November 20, 1943
- Major General Ralph J. Mitchell, USMC: November 20, 1943 - March 15, 1944
- Major General Hubert R. Harmon, USAF: March 15, 1944 - April 20, 1944
- Brigadier General Field Harris, USMC: April 20, 1944 - May 31, 1944
- Brigadier General James T. Moore, USMC: May 31, 1944 - June 15, 1944

(A full list of commanders can be seen at James A. Winnefeld, Joint Air Operations: Pursuit of Unity in Command and Control, 1942–1991, 34, drawing on Sherrod, 1952.)

== See also ==
- Pacific Ocean Areas
  - Thirteenth Air Force
- South West Pacific Area
  - Fifth Air Force
  - RAAF Command
