= Kisarazu Air Group =

Kisarazu Air Group/707th Naval Air Group
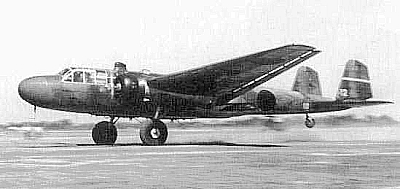
- Mitsubishi G3M1 "White 12" of Kisarazu Naval Air Group, Ōmura, 1937.
- Active: April 1, 1936 – December 1, 1942
- Country: Empire of Japan
- Allegiance: Axis Powers of World War II
- Branch: Imperial Japanese Navy
- Type: Naval aviation unit
- Role: Bomber
- Size: Varied
- Part of: Yokosuka Naval District; 1st Combined Air Group; 26th Air Flotilla
- Garrison/HQ: Kisarazu Air Field; Ōmura, Japan; Shanghai, China; Kavieng, New Ireland; Rabaul, New Britain
- Aircraft flown: G3M Type 96 "Nell"; G2H Type 95; G4M Type 1 "Betty"
- Engagements: Second Sino-Japanese War; Solomon Islands Campaign

Commanders
- Notable commanders: Miyoshi Nabeta

Insignia
- Identification symbol: キ (Ki, Apr 1936-Mar 1942); X (1938, temporarily); R (Mar 1942-Dec 1942)

The Kisarazu Naval Air Group (木更津海軍航空隊, Kisarazu Kaigun Kōkūtai) was an aircraft and airbase garrison unit of the Imperial Japanese Navy Air Service during the Second Sino-Japanese War and the Pacific campaign of World War II.

== History ==
The Kisarazu Air Group was formed at Kisarazu Air Field, in Kisarazu, Chiba Prefecture Japan on April 1, 1936 as the first land-based bomber group of the Imperial Japanese Navy. It was initially equipped with six Type 96 Yokosuka B4Y biplane attack aircraft, plus two reserve aircraft.

=== Second Sino-Japanese War operations ===
With the start of the war in China, the aircraft of the Tateyama Air Group and the Ōminato Air Group were transferred to the Kisarazu Air Group, bringing its combat strength up to twenty operational bombers and six reserve aircraft. Its first combat mission was a bombing of the Republic of China capital of Nanjing on August 15, 1937. Subsequently, strategic bombing missions were taken against the cities of Shanghai, Hangzhou, and Chongqing, as well as tactical bombing missions in support of advancing Imperial Japanese Army forces. Due to the limited range of the Yokosuka B4Y, the Kisarazu Air Group was forced to deploy from bases in Shanghai and Nanjing.

From August 27, 1937 the Kisarazu Air Group was equipped with Type 95 Nakajima A4N biplane fighters for protection against Chinese fighters; however, this proved unnecessary and the Nakajima fighters were withdrawn on October 10. The Kisarazu Air Group was withdrawn from combat on January 5, 1940.

=== Pacific War operations ===
Following its return to its home base at Kisarazu Air Field, the Kisarazu Air Group served as a training unit until March 1942. Following the attack on Pearl Harbor and the start of hostilities with the United States, it also performed patrol duties protecting the entrance to Tokyo Bay.

From March 1942, the Kisarazu Air Group was re-equipped with Type 1 Mitsubishi G4M bombers, and continued training with the new equipment until the end of August 1942.

On August 22, 1942, a detachment of nineteen Mitsubishi G4M1’s arrived in Rabaul, New Britain, joining elements from the Misawa Naval Air Group and the Fourth Air Group. This combined force bombed American positions at Henderson Field on Guadalcanal on August 25, 1942. On the following mission on August 26, one Mitsubishi G4M1 was damaged by defending USMC Grumman F4F fighters and was forced to ditch in the sea on its return. Another mission against Henderson Field was undertaken on August 29. During a bombing mission against Allied ships near Guadalcanal, the Kisarazu Air Group shared credit for sinking the American destroyer USS Colhoun (DD-85).

On September 2, 1942 nine aircraft each from the Kisarazu and the Misawa Air Groups again bombed Henderson Field, causing little damage and suffering no losses. However, on a subsequent mission on September 12, two aircraft were lost to Allied aircraft and a third was damaged in an emergency landing at Buka. Another aircraft was lost in combat over Guadalcanal on September 21.

The Kisarazu Air Group continued its bombing of Henderson Field and other targets on Guadalcanal on October 14, October 15, October 17 and October 21, with the loss of one more aircraft. On October 25, the Kisarazu Air Group flew its final combat mission, losing one more aircraft. On November 1, 1942, the remainder of the unit was re-designated as the 707th Naval Air Group (第七〇七海軍航空隊, Dai Nana-Maru-Nana Kaigun Kōkūtai), one month later, all aircraft and airmen were moved to the 705th Naval Air Group.

== Structure ==
- Higher unit
  - Yokosuka Naval District (1 April 1936–10 July 1937)
  - 1st Combined Air Group (11 July 1937–14 January 1940)
  - Yokosuka Naval District (15 January 1940–31 March 1942)
  - 26th Air Flotilla (1 April 1942–1 December 1942, dissolved.)
    - Renamed 707th Naval Air Group on 1 November 1942.
    - Incorporated to the 705th Naval Air Group on 1 December 1942.
- Commanding officers
  - Captain Ryūzō Takenaka (1 April 1936–23 September 1937)
    - Vacant post (24 September 1937–15 November 1937)
  - Captain Ryūzō Takenaka (16 November 1937–14 December 1937)
  - Captain Tomeo Kaku (15 December 1937–14 December 1938)
  - Captain Masafumi Arima (15 December 1938–14 November 1939)
  - Captain Tadao Katō (15 November 1939–31 October 1940)
  - Captain Prince Kuni Asaakira (1 November 1940–19 March 1942)
  - Captain Tomizō Maebara (20 March 1942–31 March 1942)
  - Captain Naoshirō Fujiyoshi (1 April 1942–18 October 1942)
  - Captain Yasuo Konishi (19 October 1942–1 December 1942, dissolved.)

Bibliography (in this section)

- The Japanese Modern Historical Manuscripts Association, Organizations, structures and personnel affairs of the Imperial Japanese Army & Navy, University of Tokyo Press, Tōkyō, Japan, 1971, ISBN 978-4-13-036009-8.
- Seiki Sakamoto/Hideki Fukukawa, Encyclopedia of organizations of the Imperial Japanese Navy, K.K. Fuyo Shobo Shuppan, Tokyo, Japan, 2003, ISBN 4-8295-0330-0.
- Rekishi Dokuhon Vol. 33, Document of the war No. 48 Overview of Imperial Japanese Navy Admirals, Shin-Jinbutsuoraisha Co., Ltd., Tōkyō, Japan, 1999, ISBN 4-404-02733-8.
- Model Art, No. 406, Special issue Camouflage & Markings of Imperial Japanese Navy Bombers in W.W.II, Model Art Co. Ltd., Tōkyō, Japan, 1993.
- Bunrin-Dō Co., Ltd., Tōkyō, Japan.
  - Famous airplanes of the world, No. 59, Type 1 Attack Bomber, 1996, ISBN 4-89319-056-3.
  - Famous airplanes of the world, No. 91, Type 96 Attack Bomber, 2001, ISBN 4-893-19089-X.
  - Koku-Fan Illustrated No. 42, Japanese Imperial Army & Navy Aircraft Color, Markig, 1988.
- Senshi Sōsho, Asagumo Simbun, Tōkyō, Japan.
  - Vol. 80, Combined Fleet #2, "Until June 1942", 1975.
  - Vol. 77, Combined Fleet #3, "Until February 1943", 1974.
