= Chitose Air Group =

Military unit of the Imperial Japanese Navy Air Service

- Chitose Kōkūtai
- Active: 1 October 1939-December 1942
- Disbanded: December 1942
- Country: Japan
- Allegiance: Imperial Japanese
- Branch: Navy Air Service
- Type: Air group
- Role: To support Japanese Navy's 4th Fleet

Aircraft flown
- Bomber: Mitsubishi G3M Type 96
- Fighter: Mitsubishi A5M Type 96

The Chitose Air Group (Chitose Kōkūtai) was an air group of the Imperial Japanese Navy Air Service during World War II. The group was formed on 1 October 1939 at Chitose Airfield, Hokkaidō equipped with Mitsubishi G3M Type 96 bombers. The group was later supplemented with Mitsubishi A5M Type 96 fighters. In December 1941, it was assigned to support Japanese Navy's 4th Fleet for operations in the central Pacific as part of the 24th Air Flotilla. It was renamed the 201 Air Group in December 1942. Not to be confused with IJN Chitose.
