= 11th Air Fleet (Imperial Japanese Navy) =

- Active: 1941-1945
- Type: Combined Arms
- Part of: Southeast Area Fleet

The 11th Air Fleet (第十一航空艦隊, Dai-Jūichi Kōkū Kantai) was a grouping of naval aviation and surface units.

== Assignments and Components ==
Date	Higher unit	Lower units
15 January 1941 (original)	Combined Fleet	21st Air Flotilla, 22nd Air Flotilla, 24th Air Flotilla
10 December 1941	Combined Fleet	21st Air Flotilla, 22nd Air Flotilla, 23rd Air Flotilla, DesDiv. 34 (Destroyer Akikaze, Hakaze, Tachikaze), Auxiliary aircraft transport Keiyō Maru, Lyons Maru, Kamogawa Maru, Amagisan Maru, Nikkoku Maru, Tatsugami Maru, Hinō Maru No. 5, Nana Maru; 1st Yokosuka SNLF, 2nd Yokosuka SNLF
14 July 1942	Combined Fleet	22nd Air Flotilla, 24th Air Flotilla, 25th Air Flotilla, 26th Air Flotilla, DesDiv. 34, Auxiliary aircraft transport Lyons Maru, Keiyō Maru, Nagoya Maru
24 December 1942	Southeast Area Fleet	22nd Air Flotilla, 24th Air Flotilla, 25th Air Flotilla, 26th Air Flotilla, Atsugi NAG, Toyohashi NAG, 802nd NAG, Seaplane tender Akitsushima, Destroyer Akikaze, Tachikaze; Auxiliary aircraft transport Lyons Maru, Keiyō Maru, Nagoya Maru, Goshū Maru, Mogamigawa Maru, Fujikawa Maru
1 January 1944	Southeast Area Fleet	25th Air Flotilla, 26th Air Flotilla, 151st NAG, Seaplane tender Akitsushima, Destroyer Akikaze, Tachikaze
15 August 1944	Southeast Area Fleet	958th NAG, 105th Air Base Unit
6 September 1945	Surrendered to Australia at Rabaul.	

== Commanders ==
	Rank	Name	Date	Note, additional post
1	Vice-Admiral	Eikichi Katagiri	15 January 1941	
2	Vice-Admiral	Nishizō Tsukahara	10 September 1941	
3	Vice-Admiral	Jin'ichi Kusaka	1 October 1942	
3	Vice-Admiral	Jin'ichi Kusaka	24 December 1942	Commander of the Southeast Area Fleet

== Chiefs of Staff ==
	Rank	Name	Date	Note, additional post
1	Rear-Admiral	Takijirō Ōnishi	15 January 1941	
2	Rear-Admiral	Munetaka Sakamaki	10 February 1942	
3	Rear-Admiral; Vice-Admiral	Yoshimasa Nakahara	24 December 1942; 1 November 1943	Chief of staff of the Southeast Area Fleet
4	Rear-Admiral	Ryūnosuke Kusaka	29 November 1943	Chief of staff of the Southeast Area Fleet
5	Rear-Admiral	Sadatoshi Tomioka	6 April 1944	Chief of staff of the Southeast Area Fleet
6	Vice-Admiral	Naosaburō Irifune	7 November 1944	Chief of staff of the Southeast Area Fleet; Commander of the 8th Base Force
6	Vice-Admiral	Naosaburō Irifune	1 December 1944	Chief of staff of the Southeast Area Fleet
