= USS Lexington =

USS Lexington may refer to these ships of the United States Navy:

- USS Lexington (1776), a brigantine acquired in 1776 and captured in 1777
- USS Lexington (1825), a sloop-of-war in commission from 1826–1830 and 1831–1855
- USS Lexington (1861), a timber-clad gunboat in commission from 1861–1865
- USS Lexington II (SP-705), later USS SP-705, a patrol vessel in commission from 1917–1918
- USS Lexington (CC-1), a Lexington-class battlecruiser, converted to CV-2 in 1922
- USS Lexington (CV-2), a Lexington-class aircraft carrier commissioned in 1927 and sunk in 1942
- USS Lexington (CV-16), an Essex-class aircraft carrier in commission from 1943–1991, now a museum in Corpus Christi, Texas
