= USS SP-1595 =

Patrol vessel of the United States Navy

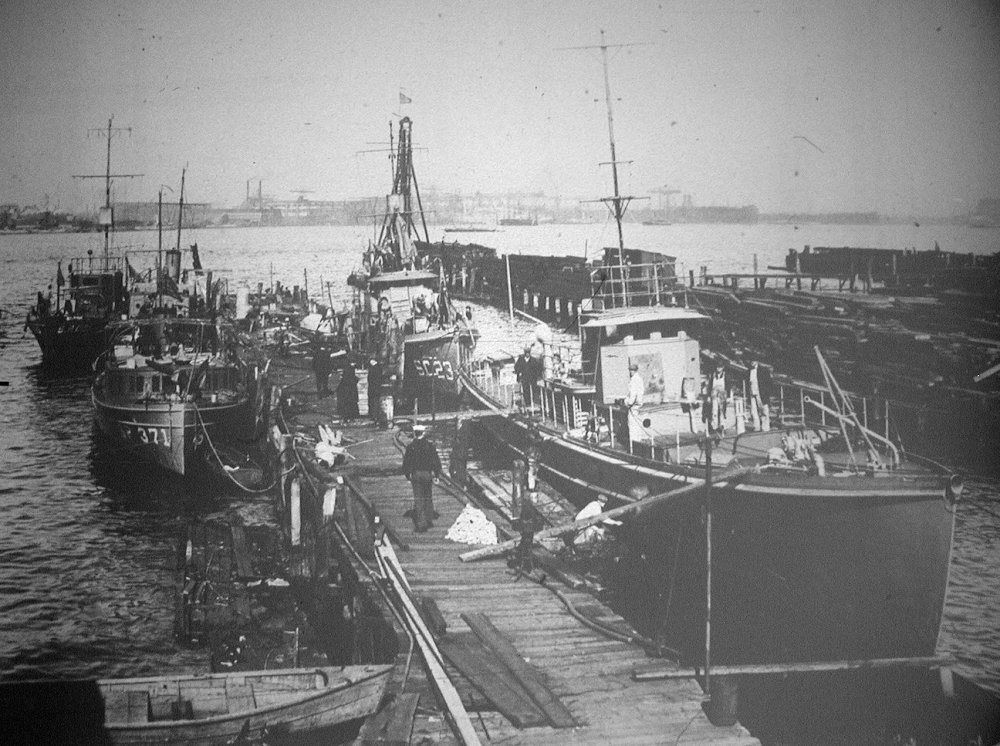
- USS SP-1595 (right background) is among the United States Navy patrol vessels at Philadelphia, Pennsylvania, in this photograph taken on 15 January 1919. Moored ahead of her is the section patrol boat USS Absegami (SP-371) (left center). Across the pier are the submarine chaser USS SC-23 (right background) and an unidentified submarine chaser (right foreground).

History

United States
- Name: Unknown; section patrol number was SP-1595

General characteristics
- Type: Patrol vessel

USS SP-1595 was a United States Navy patrol vessel in commission during World War I.

Almost no information has been found regarding SP-1595; its name, operational history, and characteristics are unknown. However, a photograph taken in Philadelphia, Pennsylvania, on 15 January 1919 shows a section patrol boat designated SP-1595 in U.S. Navy service on that date.
