= Absegami =

Absegami may refer to:

- Absegami Indians, part of the Lenape tribe; they lived in modern southern New Jersey
- Absegami High School, a high school in Galloway Township, New Jersey
- USS Absegami (SP-371), a United States Navy ship during World War I.
- Absegami Natural Area, part of Bass River State Forest, a New Jersey state park
- Lake Absegami, an artificial lake in Bass River State Forest
