= YT-46-class harbor tugboat =

Wood-hulled tugboat

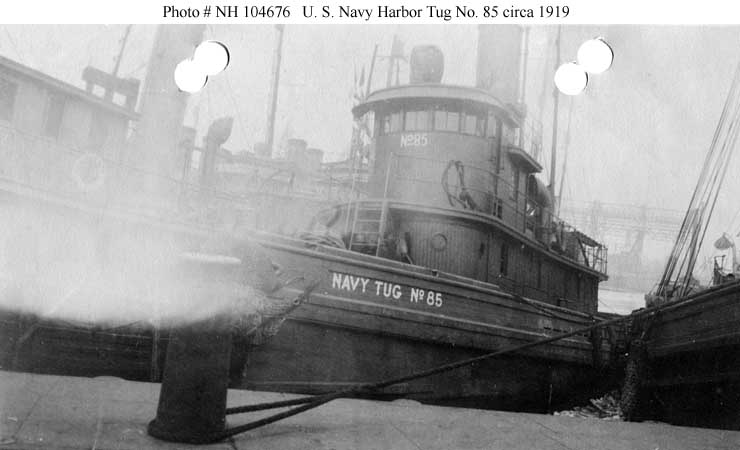
- U.S. Navy Harbor Tug No. 85, circa 1919

Class overview
- Name: YT-46-class harbor tugboat
- Builders: Charleston Navy Yard; New Orleans Naval Yard; Clayton Ship & Boat Building Company, Clayton, New York; Eastern Shipyard Company, Greenport, New York; Eastern Shore Shipbuilding Company, Sharpstown, Maryland; Greenport Basin and Construction Company, Greenport, New York; Hiltebrant Dry Dock Company, Kingston, New York; Robert Jacob Shipyard, City Island, New York; Luders Marine Construction Company, Stamford, Connecticut; Mathis Yacht Building Company, Camden, New Jersey; New York Yacht, Launch & Engine Company, Bronx, New York; Vinyard Shipbuilding Company, Milford, Delaware; Wheeler Shipyard Corporation, Brooklyn, New York
- Built: 1918-1919
- Planned: 40
- Completed: 40

General characteristics
- Type: Tugboat
- Tonnage: 215 gross tons
- Length: 88 ft 8 in (27.03 m)
- Beam: 20 ft 0 in (6.10 m)
- Draft: 8 ft 9 in (2.67 m)

The YT-46-class harbor tugboat was a wood-hulled tugboat design ordered by the U.S. Navy in May and June 1918 during World War I. 40 ships of the type (Harbor Tugs Nos. 46-85) were launched and completed at 13 shipyards: the Charleston Navy Yard; the New Orleans Naval Yard; the Clayton Ship & Boat Building Company, Clayton, New York; the Eastern Shipyard Company, Greenport, New York; the Eastern Shore Shipbuilding Company, Sharpstown, Maryland; the Greenport Basin and Construction Company, Greenport, New York; the Hiltebrant Dry Dock Company, Kingston, New York; Robert Jacob Shipyard, City Island, New York; the Luders Marine Construction Company, Stamford, Connecticut; the Mathis Yacht Building Company, Camden, New Jersey; the New York Yacht, Launch & Engine Company, Bronx, New York; the Vinyard Shipbuilding Company, Milford, Delaware; and the Wheeler Shipyard Corporation, Brooklyn, New York. In 1920, at the Navy's adoption of alpha-numeric hull designations, the ships were classified as yard tugs YT-46 though YT-85.

== See also ==
- YT-86-class tugboat
