= USS Absegami =

Patrol vessel of the United States Navy

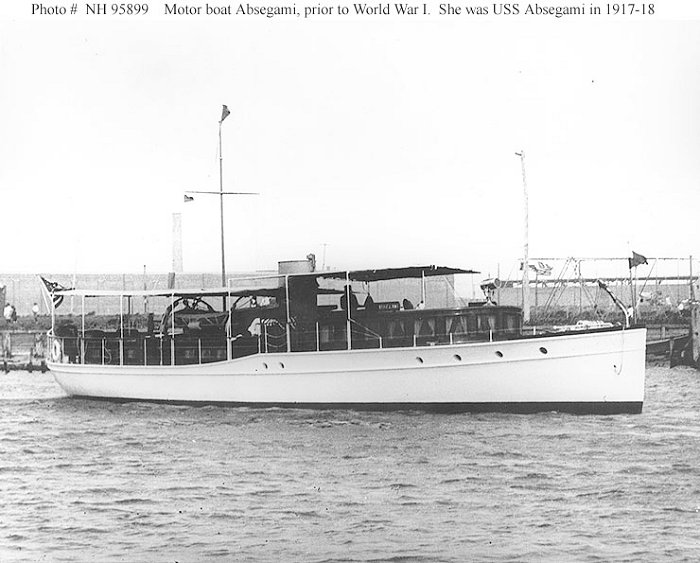
- Absegami, photographed c. 1916

History

United States
- Name: Absegami
- Namesake: Absegami were part of the Lenape tribe
- Owner: Allen K. White, Atlantic City, New Jersey
- Builder: New York Yacht, Launch & Engine Company, New York City
- Launched: 1916
- Fate: turned over to the USN on free lease, 2 May 1917
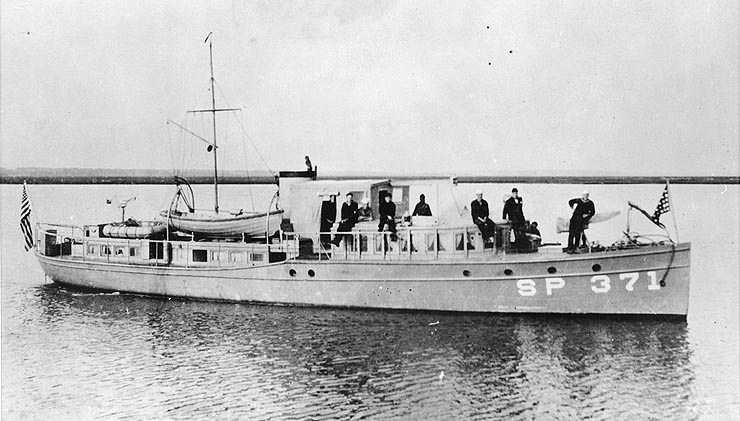
- USS Absegami (SP-371), photographed c. 1917

History

United States
- Name: Absegami
- Acquired: 2 May 1917
- Commissioned: 30 April 1917
- Decommissioned: 2 December 1918
- Fate: returned to owner, 6 December 1918

General characteristics
- Type: Motorboat
- Tonnage: 51 GRT
- Length: 75 ft (23 m) (overall); 70 ft 3 in (21.41 m) (waterline)
- Beam: 16 ft (4.9 m)
- Draft: 3 ft 6 in (1.07 m) (mean)
- Installed power: 2 × Heavy duty 6-cylinder gasoline engines; 130 ihp (97 kW)
- Propulsion: 2 × propellers
- Speed: 13 kn (24 km/h; 15 mph)
- Range: 330 nmi (610 km; 380 mi) at 10 kn (19 km/h; 12 mph)
- Complement: 1 officer 10 enlisted
- Armament: 1 × 1-pounder 37 mm (1.5 in) gun; 1 × machine gun

USS Absegami (SP-371) was a motorboat acquired on a free lease by the United States Navy during World War I. She was outfitted as an armed patrol craft and assigned to patrol the Delaware River from Philadelphia, Pennsylvania, to Cape May, New Jersey on the Delaware Bay. When the Navy found her excess to their needs, she was returned to her former owner.

== Construction and career ==
=== Built in New York ===
Absegami was a motor boat built in 1916 at New York City by the New York Yacht, Launch & Engine Co.; acquired by the Navy on free lease from her owner, Allen K. White, Atlantic City, New Jersey, on 2 May 1917; and commissioned at the Philadelphia Navy Yard on 30 April 1917, Ensign W. G. Morse .

=== World War I service ===
Following her commissioning, Absegami was assigned to section patrol duty in the 4th Naval District. Throughout World War I, the boat patrolled the Delaware Bay and Atlantic Ocean waters off Cape May, New Jersey. Absegami was decommissioned at Philadelphia on 2 December 1918 and returned to her owner four days later.

== Gallery ==
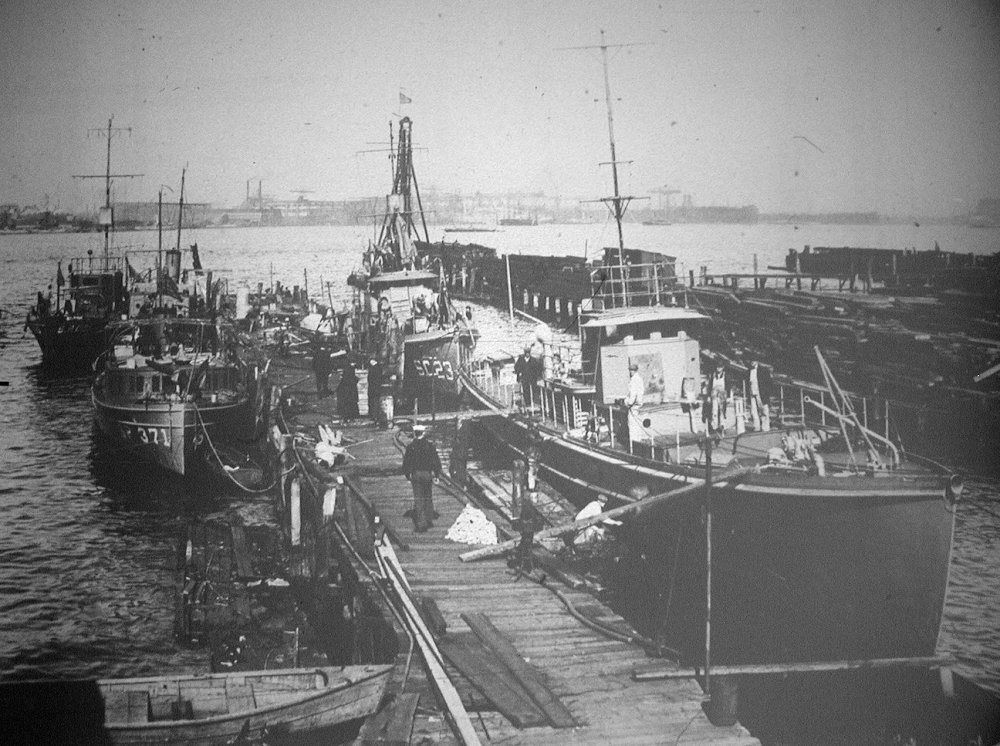
USS Absegami (SP-371) is at left center in this photograph of United States Navy patrol vessels at Philadelphia, Pennsylvania, on 15 January 1919. Astern of Absegami is a section patrol boat identified only as SP-1595 (left background). Across the pier are the submarine chaser USS SC-23 (right background), and an unidentified submarine chaser (right foreground).
