= 4th Air Group =

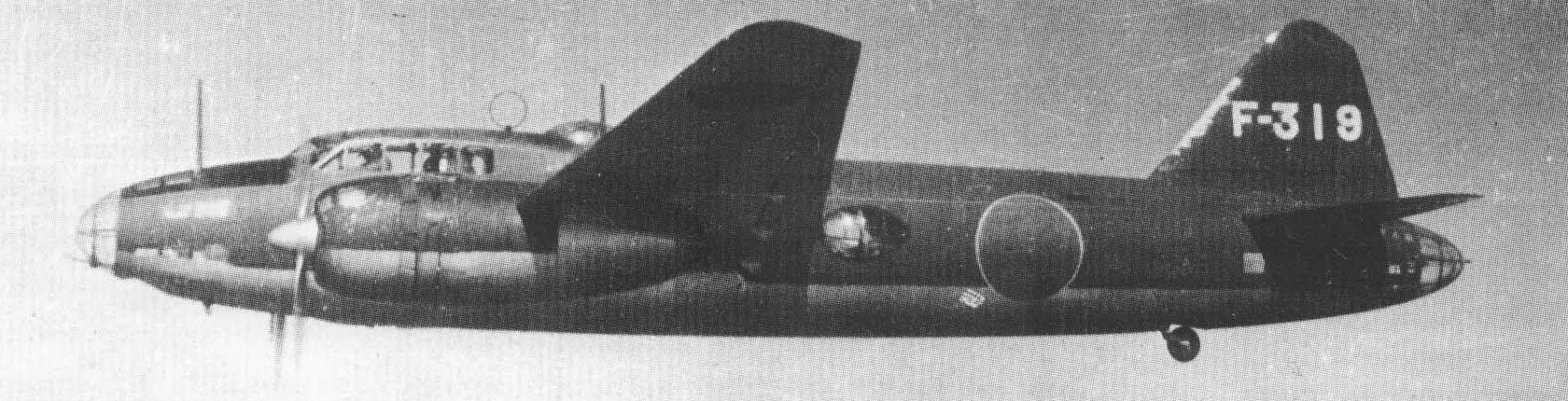
- A Mitsubishi G4M Rikko Navy Type 1 Attack Bomber of the 4th Air Group's 1st section (1st chutai) in ferrying or reconnaissance mode configuration, indicated by fairings installed over the usually open bomb bay, photographed around August 1942.
- Active: 10 February 1942 – 1 November 1942
- Country: Empire of Japan
- Branch: (Empire of Japan) Imperial Japanese Navy
- Type: Naval aviation unit
- Role: Bomber
- Part of: 24th Air Flotilla, 11th Air Fleet IJNAS; 25th Air Flotilla, 11th Air Fleet IJNAS
- Garrison/HQ: Truk, Micronesia; Rabaul, New Britain
- Engagements: New Guinea Campaign; Guadalcanal Campaign

The 4th Air Group (第四航空隊, Dai-Yon Kōkūtai) was a land-based bomber aircraft unit of the Imperial Japanese Navy Air Service (IJNAS) during the Pacific campaign of World War II. The air group was redesignated as the 702nd Air Group on 1 November 1942.

== History ==
The unit was formed on 10 February 1942 by combining one division (buntai) from Chitose Air Group that was previously stationed in the Central Pacific, and two divisions from Takao Air Group that participated in the conquest of the Philippines and Dutch East Indies. They operated the new Mitsubishi G4M Rikko Navy Type 1 Attack Bomber aircraft. That same month, the group was deployed to Rabaul, New Britain to support Japanese operations during the early stages of the New Guinea Campaign, at first as part of the 24th Air Flotilla and from April as part of the 25th Air Flotilla.

On 20 February, a flying boat from Yokohama Air Group spotted a US carrier task force centered around Lexington 460 nautical miles from Rabaul. 4th Air Group medium bombers were ordered to attack the task force with bombs, since Type 91 aerial torpedoes had not yet arrived at the newly captured outpost at Rabaul. To make matters worse, external fuel tanks for Mitsubishi A6M Zero fighters stationed at Rabaul had not yet arrived either, which meant that they could not escort the bombers at such distances. The attack formation consisted of 17 G4M, each equipped with two 250 kg bombs, and was led by the unit's Hikōtaichō Lieutenant Commander Takuzō Itō, who flew as an observer in the lead aircraft. In the ensuing action off Bougainville, the unit lost 15 bombers to enemy F4F Wildcat fighters and anti-aircraft fire (including its Hikōtaichō and two Buntaichōs). Only a few bombers managed to come close enough to release the bombs at Lexington, however, they all missed the carrier, where the closest bomb landed about 30 meters astern. The lead bomber attempted to crash into Lexington, but it was downed 1400 meters before the carrier.

The 4th Air Group losses were soon replenished and then regularly conducted bombing raids against Port Moresby on New Guinea from March to August. On 7 May 1942, they had a minor involvement in the Battle of the Coral Sea, where they performed a torpedo attack on Allied cruisers around Jomard Passage. They scored no hits and lost five of 12 aircraft.

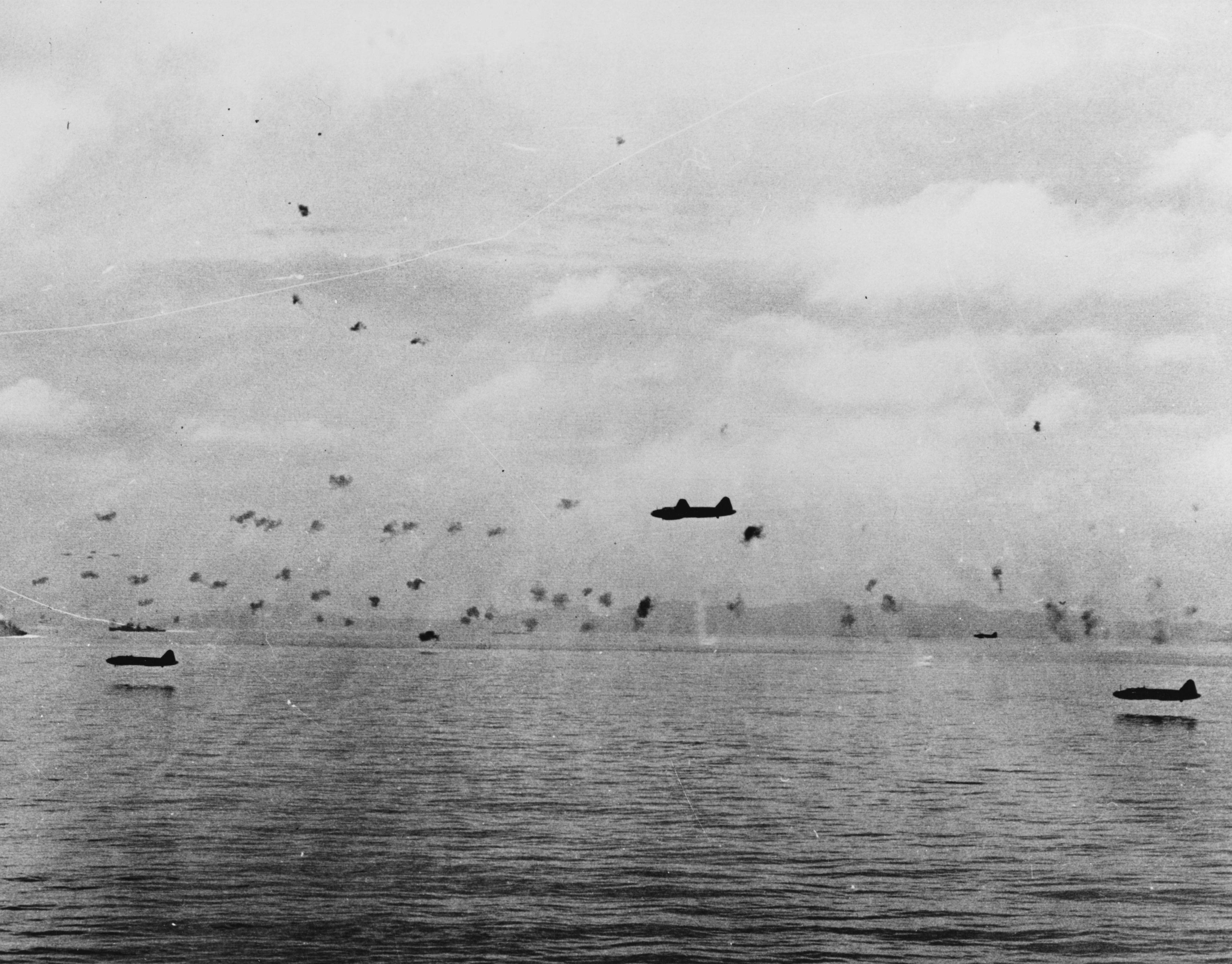
G4M bombers performing an extremely low-level torpedo attack on Allied ships off Guadalcanal on 8 August 1942.

On 7 August 1942, the 4th Air Group prepared to strike a newly discovered enemy airfield near Milne Bay on New Guinea, when the shocking news of the Allied landing on Guadalcanal came in. The commanders decided that there was no time to exchange bombs for torpedoes and sent 27 G4M bombers to attack the beach near Lunga Point. The formation was led by Lieutenant Rempei Egawa and reached Guadalcanal shortly after 13:00. They scored no hits on the ships, for the loss of four aircraft. The next morning, Lieutenant Shigeru Kotani (senior Buntaichō) led 17 bombers from the 4th Air Group (joined by nine from Misawa Air Group), this time properly equipped with torpedoes, for another strike against the ships near the beachhead. The ship-based anti-aircraft fire decimated the formation and only a few aircraft managed to release their torpedoes, one damaging a destroyer. On top of that, the few surviving aircraft were then ambushed by F4F fighters on the way out. In total, only five severely damaged aircraft managed to return to Rabaul and 125 men perished in the attack, including all officers.

The 4th Air Group participated in frequent attacks on Henderson Field during the initial stage of Guadalcanal Campaign. In late September 1942, after taking heavy losses, the unit was withdrawn from the area. In seven months of combat, the unit lost two Hikotaichos, six Buntaichos, over 40 aircrews and more than 50 aircraft. On 1 November 1942, the unit was re-designated as the 702nd Air Group.

== Personnel Assigned ==
=== Commanding Officers ===
- Capt. Moritama Hiroshi (45) – 10 February 1942 – 1 November 1942

=== Executive Officers ===
- VACANT – 10 February 1942 – 20 July 1942
- Cdr. Uchibori Yoshiro (50) – 20 July 1942 – 1 November 1942

=== Maintenance Officers ===
- LtCdr. (Eng.) Goto Takeichi (Eng. 36) – 10 February 1942 – 1 November 1942

=== Surgeons ===
- LtCdr. (Med.) Ueda Hideyasu (1932) – 10 February 1942 – 1 November 1942

=== Paymasters ===
- Lt. (Pay.) Nomaguchi Fumio (Pay. Aux. 1) – 10 February 1942 – 1 September 1942
- Lt. (Pay.) Tomita Koji (1940) – 1 September 1942 – 1 November 1942

=== Communications Officers ===
- LtCdr. Horino Yoshiyuki (58) – 10 February 1942 – 20 October 1942
- Lt. Yoshizumi Seiichi (64) – 20 October 1942 – 1 November 1942

=== Air Officers ===
- Cdr. Miyazaki Takashi (52) – 10 February 1942 – 1 April 1942
- LtCdr. / Cdr.* Tsuzaki Naonobu (51) – 1 April 1942 – 10 July 1942 (KIA; Commander posthumously)
- VACANT – 10 July 1942 – 20 July 1942
- LtCdr. Mitsui Kenji (55) – 20 July 1942 – 1 November 1942
