= New York Yacht, Launch & Engine Company =

Shipbuilding company in New York, United States

New York Yacht, Launch & Engine Company was a shipyard located on the Harlem River in the Morris Heights neighborhood of the Bronx.

== History ==
The New York Yacht, Launch & Engine Company was active from 1903 until 1931. They built power boats for private owners and smaller ships for the U.S. Navy and U.S. Coast Guard. In 1917 and 1918, they built 30 of the 110-foot SC-1-class submarine chasers for the U.S. Navy (numbered SC-223 through SC-242 and SC-393 through SC-402). In 1919, they built 5 of the 88-foot YT-46-class harbor tugs for the U.S. Navy (numbered YT-77 through YT-81). In 1924 and 1925, they built ten 75-foot patrol boats for the U.S. Coast Guard (numbered CG-160 through CG-169) which were used during Prohibition to intercept rumrunners.

== Gallery ==
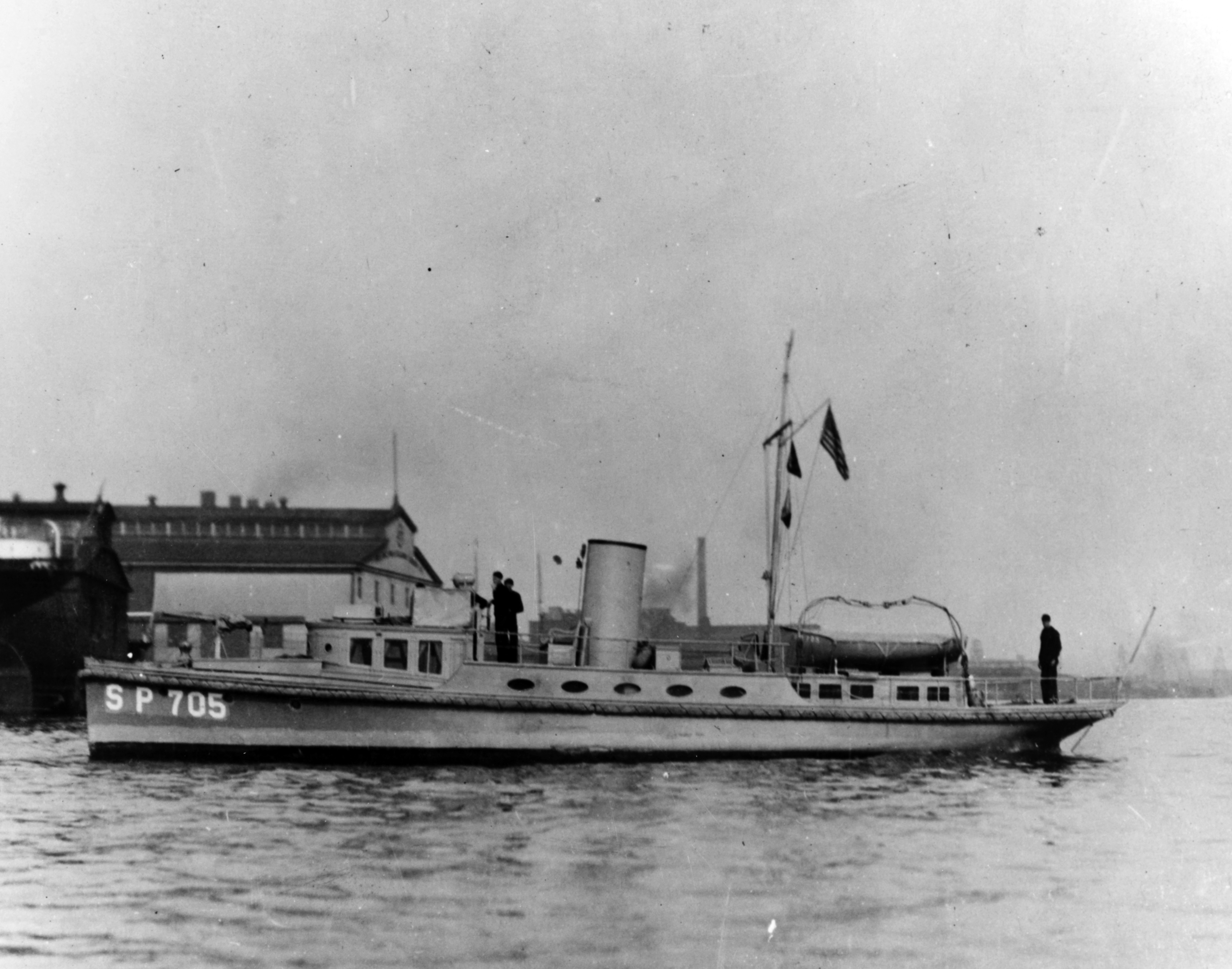
Lexington II (SP-705) photographed during World War I

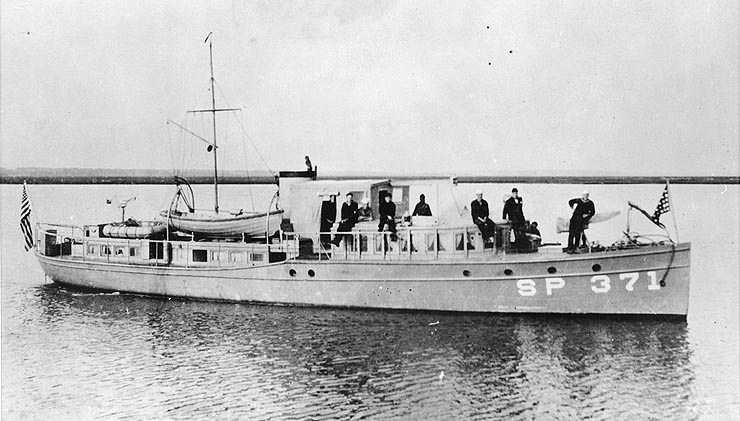
USS Absegami (SP-371), photographed (circa 1917)
