= YT-86-class tugboat =

Wood-hulled tugboat

Class overview
- Name: YT-86-class harbor tugboat
- Builders: Mare Island Naval Shipyard, Vallejo, California; Pearl Harbor Naval Shipyard, Hawaii
- Built: 1918-1920
- Planned: 15
- Completed: 15

General characteristics
- Type: Tugboat
- Tonnage: 54 gross tons
- Length: 65 ft 8 in (20.02 m)
- Beam: 16 ft 2 in (4.93 m)
- Draft: 6 ft 2 in (1.88 m)
- Propulsion: one Union 4 cylinder, 4 cycle gasoline engine, 150shp, single 12" X 15" propeller

The YT-86-class harbor tugboat was a wood-hulled tugboat design ordered by the U.S. Navy during World War I. 15 ships of the type were launched and completed, 12 as harbor tugs (Nos. 86-90 and 92-99) and three as ambulance boats (Nos. 91, 100, and 101 were designated as Ambulance Boats No. 1, No. 2, and No. 3). All were launched at the Mare Island Naval Shipyard in Vallejo, California except for one (No. 90) at the Pearl Harbor Naval Shipyard in Hawaii. In 1920, after the Navy's adoption of alpha-numeric hull designations, the ships were classified as yard tugs YT-86 though YT-90 and YT-92 through YT-99 and ambulance boats YH-1, YH-2, and YH-3.

== See also ==
- YT-46-class harbor tugboat
