= USS Lexington II =

US Navy section patrol boat

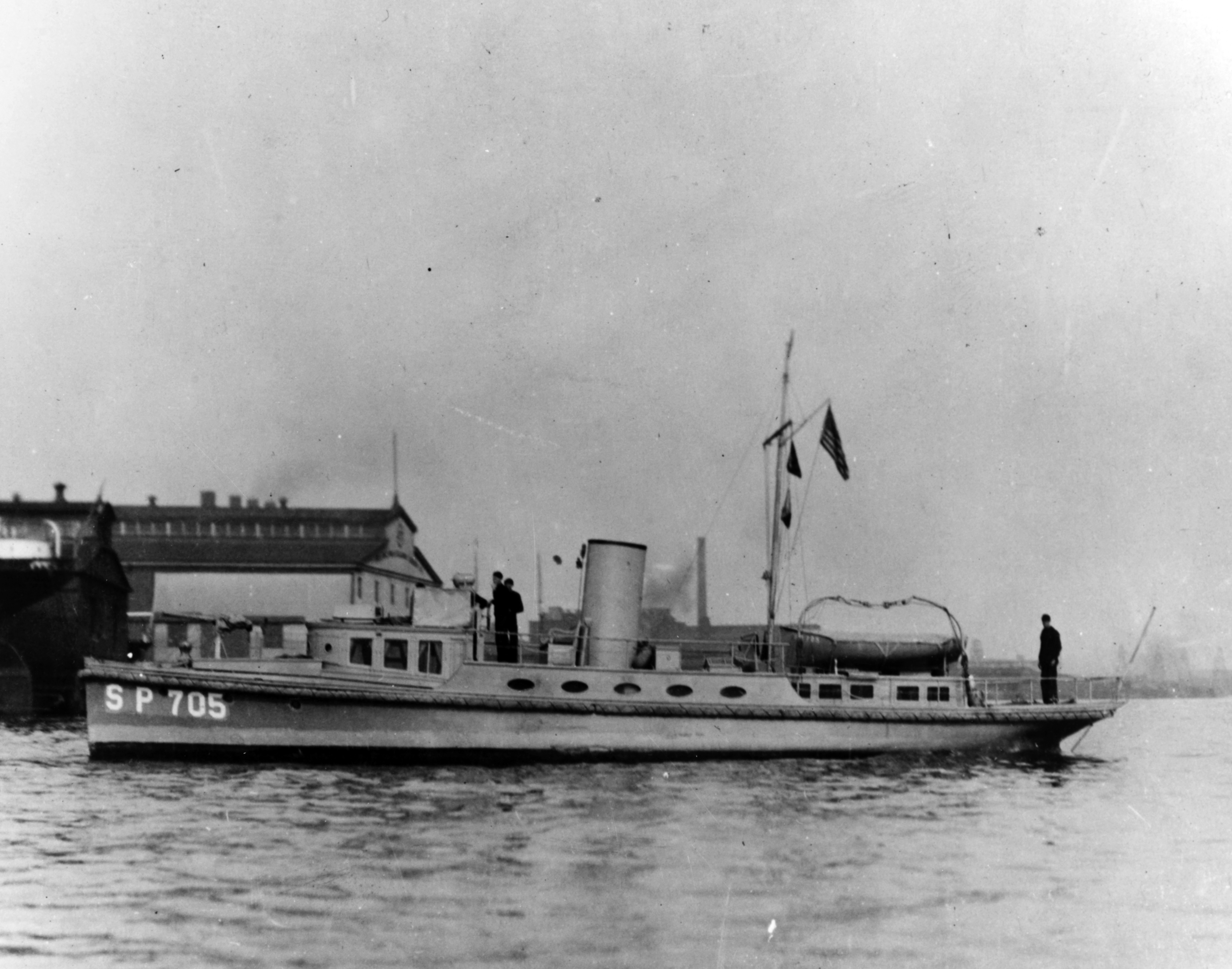
- Lexington II (SP-705) photographed during World War I

History

United States
- Name: USS Lexington II (1917-1918); USS SP-705 (1918)
- Namesake: Lexington II was her previous name retained; SP-705 was her section patrol number
- Builder: New York Yacht, Launch & Engine Company, Morris Heights, the Bronx, New York
- Completed: 1911
- Acquired: Chartered 13 July 1917; Delivered 22 July 1917
- Commissioned: 23 July 1917
- Decommissioned: 21 November 1918
- Renamed: SP-705 in 1918
- Fate: Returned to owner 23 November 1918
- Notes: Operated as private motorboat Lexington II 1911-1917 and from 1918

General characteristics
- Type: Patrol vessel
- Tonnage: 21 or 27 Gross register tons
- Length: 65 ft 4 in (19.91 m)
- Beam: 11 ft 8 in (3.56 m)
- Draft: 5 ft (1.5 m) aft
- Speed: 13 knots
- Complement: 10
- Armament: 1 × 1-pounder gun; 1 × .30-caliber (7.62-mm) machine gun

USS Lexington II (SP-705), later USS SP-705, was an American patrol vessel in commission from 1917 to 1918.

Lexington II was built as a private motorboat of the same name in 1911 by the New York Yacht, Launch & Engine Company at Morris Heights in the Bronx, New York. On 13 July 1917, the U.S. Navy chartered her from her owner, Dale B. Fitler of Philadelphia, Pennsylvania, for use as a section patrol boat during World War I. Delivered to the Navy on 22 July 1917, she was commissioned as USS Lexington II (SP-705) on 23 July 1917 at Camden, New Jersey. She was enrolled in the Naval Coast Defense Reserve on 26 July 1917.

Assigned to the 4th Naval District and based at Philadelphia, Lexington II served on patrol duties for the rest of World War I. She guarded the submarine nets in the Delaware River and also conducted patrols around Philadelphia, into the lower reaches of the Delaware River to the Delaware Bay, and through the Chesapeake and Delaware Canal to the Chesapeake Bay. She was renamed USS SP-705 sometime in 1918.

SP-705 was decommissioned at Philadelphia on 21 November 1918 and returned to Fitler on 23 November 1918.
