= 24th Air Flotilla =

24th Air Flotilla 第二十四航空戦隊
- Active: 1940-1944
- Country: Japan
- Branch: Aviation
- Part of: 4th Fleet

The 24th Air Flotilla (第二十四航空戦隊, Dai-Nijūyon Kōkū-Sentai) was a combat aviation unit of the Imperial Japanese Navy (IJN) during the Pacific Campaign of World War II. The flotilla, mainly consisting of land-based bombers, fighters, and flying boats, reported to the IJN's 4th Fleet. As originally organized, the flotilla's core units were the 4th Air Corps, Yokohama Air Corps, and 1st Air Corps.

== Organization ==
- The 4th Combined Air Group (第4連合航空隊, Dai-yon Rengō Kōkutai) was original unit of the 24th Air Flotilla, therefore, describe this section from the 4th Combined Air Group.

Date	Higher unit	Unit name	Aviation units and vessels
15 November 1940 (original)	Combined Fleet	4th Combined Air Group	Chitose Naval Air Group (Note: Attack bomber unit. Renamed 703rd Naval Air Group on 1 November 1942.), Yokohama Naval Air Group (Note: Flying boat unit. Renamed 801st Naval Air Group on 1 November 1942.), Seaplane tender Kamoi
15 January 1941	11th Air Fleet	24th Air Flotilla (renamed)	Chitose Naval Air Group, Yokohama Naval Air Group, Seaplane tender Kamoi, MV Goshū Maru
10 April 1941	11th Air Fleet	24th Air Flotilla	Chitose Naval Air Group, Yokohama Naval Air Group, 1st Air Group (Note: Attack bomber unit. Renamed 752nd Naval Air Group on 1 November 1942.), Seaplane tender Kamoi, MV Goshū Maru
20 December 1941	4th Fleet	24th Air Flotilla	Chitose Naval Air Group, Yokohama Naval Air Group, 1st Air Group, MV Goshū Maru
16 February 1942	4th Fleet	24th Air Flotilla	Chitose Naval Air Group, Yokohama Naval Air Group, 1st Air Group, 4th Air Group (Note: Attack bomber unit. Renamed 702nd Naval Air Group on 1 November 1942.), MV Goshū Maru
1 April 1942	11th Air Fleet	24th Air Flotilla	Chitose Naval Air Group, Yokohama Naval Air Group, 1st Air Group, MV Goshū Maru
1 December 1942	11th Air Fleet	24th Air Flotilla	201st Naval Air Group (Note: Carrier-borne fighter unit. Independent from Chitose Naval Air Group (703rd Naval Air Group) on 1 December 1942. Equipped Mitsubishi A6M), 552nd Naval Air Group (Note: Carrier-borne dive bomber unit. Equipped Aichi D3A), 752nd Naval Air Group
5 August 1943	12th Air Fleet	24th Air Flotilla	531st Naval Air Group (Note: Carrier-borne attack bomber unit. Equipped Nakajima B6N), 752nd Naval Air Group
1 December 1943	12th Air Fleet	24th Air Flotilla	281st Naval Air Group (Note: Carrier-borne fighter unit. Equipped Mitsubishi A6M), 531st Naval Air Group, 752nd Naval Air Group
20 February 1944	dissolved		

== Commanding officers ==
	Rank	Name	Date	Note
1	Rear-Admiral	Ryūnosuke Kusaka	15 November 1940	
2	Rear-Admiral; Vice-Admiral	Eiji Gotō	15 April 1941; 15 October 1941	
3	Rear-Admiral	Minoru Maeda	1 June 1942	
4	Rear-Admiral; Vice-Admiral	Michiyuki Yamada	20 January 1943; 6 February 1944	KIA on 6 February 1944 at Ruot (Battle of Kwajalein). Posthumly promoted to Vice-Admiral on same day.
x	vacant post		7 February 1944	After unnoticed death of Rear-Admiral Yamada.
