= Sharpstown, Maryland =

Unincorporated community in Maryland, U.S.

Coordinates: 39°08′11″N 76°13′07″W

Sharpstown is an unincorporated community in Kent County, Maryland, United States.
