= USS SC-23 =

US Navy anti-submarine warfare ship

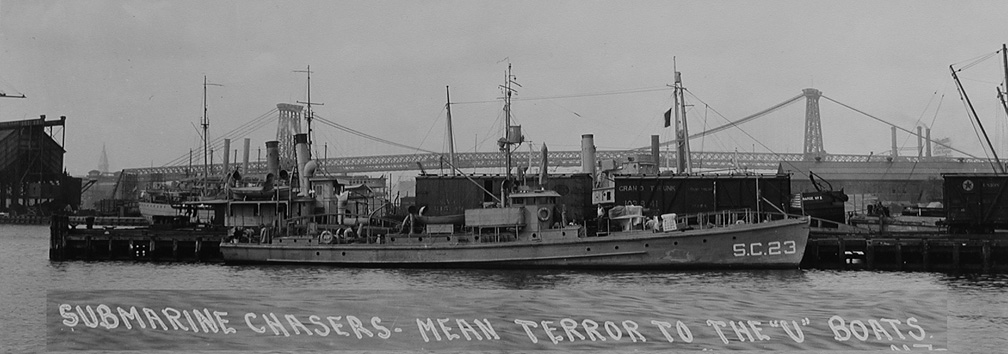
- Submarine Chaser No. 23 at Brooklyn, New York, with the Brooklyn Bridge in the distance. Someone has written SUBMARINE CHASERS MEAN TERROR TO THE "U" BOATS across the bottom of the photograph in tribute to the antisubmarine warfare role of submarine chasers against German submarines during World War I.

History

United States
- Name: USS Submarine Chaser No. 23 (1917-1920); USS SC-23 (1920-1921)
- Builder: New York Navy Yard, Brooklyn, New York
- Commissioned: 16 October 1917
- Reclassified: SC-23 on 17 July 1920
- Fate: Destroyed by fire 1920

General characteristics
- Class & type: SC-1-class submarine chaser
- Displacement: 77 tons normal; 85 tons full load
- Length: 110 ft (34 m) overall; 105 ft (32 m) between perpendiculars
- Beam: 14 ft 9 in (4.50 m)
- Draft: 5 ft 7 in (1.70 m) normal; 6 ft 6 in (1.98 m) full load
- Propulsion: Three 220 bhp (160 kW) Standard Motor Construction Company six-cylinder gasoline engines, three shafts, 2,400 US gallons (9,100 L) of gasoline; one Standard Motor Construction Company two-cylinder gasoline-powered auxiliary engine
- Speed: 18 knots (33 km/h)
- Range: 1,000 nautical miles (1,900 km) at 10 knots (19 km/h)
- Complement: 27 (2 officers, 25 enlisted men)
- Sensors & processing systems: One Submarine Signal Company S.C. C Tube, M.B. Tube, or K Tube hydrophone
- Armament: 1 × 3-inch (76.2 mm)/23-caliber gun mount; 2 × Colt .30 caliber (7.62 mm) machine guns; 1 × Y-gun depth charge projector

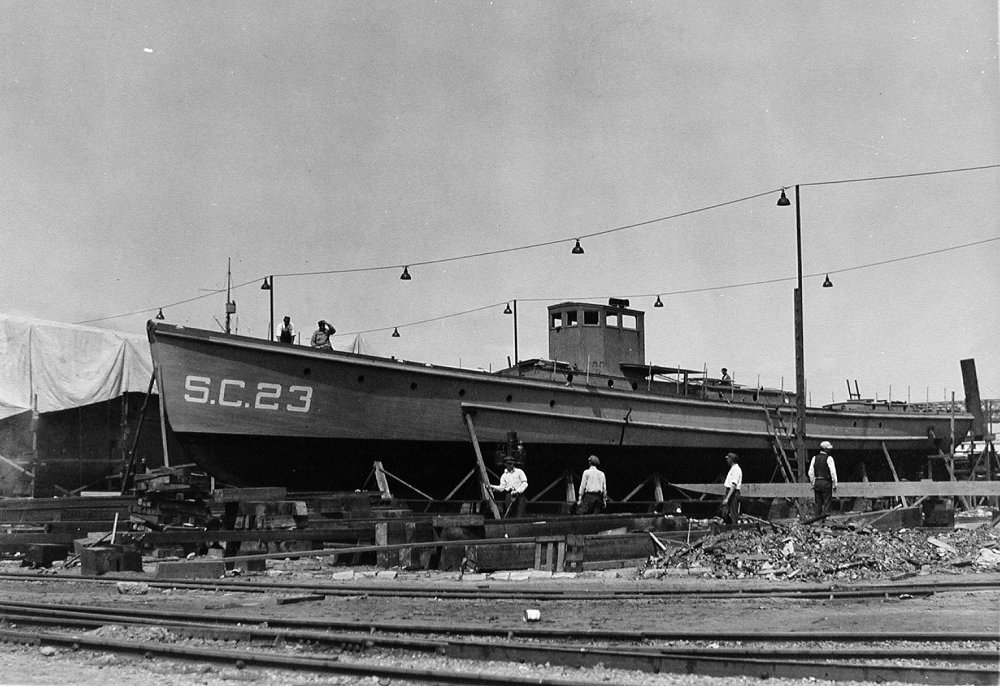
S.C. 23 under construction at the New York Navy Yard at Brooklyn, New York, on 15 September 1917.

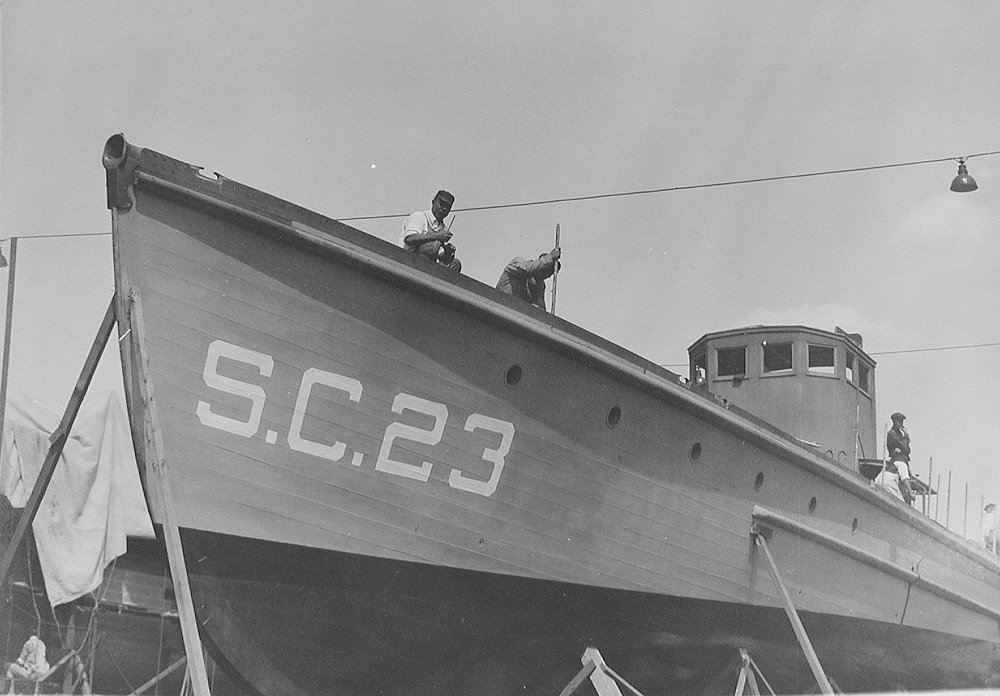
S.C. 23 under construction at the New York Navy Yard at Brooklyn, New York, on 15 September 1917.

USS SC-23, until July 1920 known as USS Submarine Chaser No. 23 or USS S.C. 23, was an SC-1-class submarine chaser built for the United States Navy during World War I.

SC-23 was a wooden-hulled 110-foot (34 m) submarine chaser built at the New York Navy Yard at Brooklyn, New York. She was commissioned on 16 October 1917 as USS Submarine Chaser No. 23, abbreviated at the time as USS S.C. 23.

During World War I, S.C. 23 served in the USS Patterson Group of submarine chasers.

When the U.S. Navy adopted its modern hull number system on 17 July 1920, Submarine Chaser No. 23 was classified as SC-23 and her name was shortened to USS SC-23.

Sometime in 1920, SC-23 was destroyed by fire.
