= Kanoya Air Group =

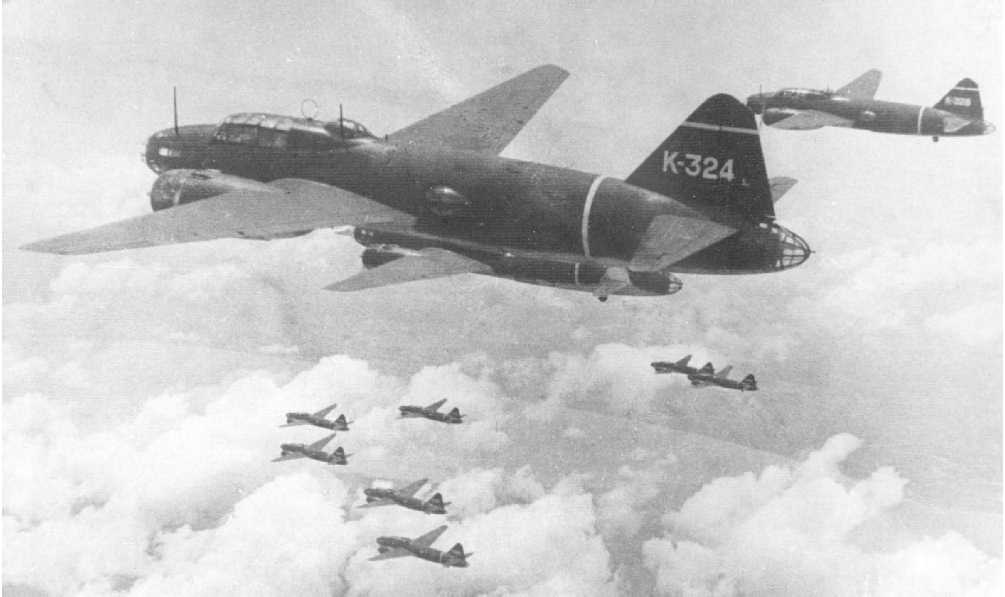
- Active: 1 April 1936 – 10 July 1944
- Country: Empire of Japan
- Branch: (Empire of Japan) Imperial Japanese Navy
- Type: Naval aviation unit
- Role: Bomber, Fighter
- Part of: 21st Air Flotilla
- Garrison/HQ: Kanoya, Japan; Hankou, China; Saigon, French Indochina; Kendari, Sulawesi; Kavieng, New Ireland; Rabaul, New Britain
- Engagements: Second Sino-Japanese War; Philippines Campaign; Sinking of Prince of Wales and Repulse; Battle of Malaya; Battle of Singapore; Dutch East Indies Campaign; New Guinea Campaign; Guadalcanal Campaign; Solomon Islands Campaign; Naval Battle of Guadalcanal (Note: As 253rd Air Group.); Battle of Rennell Island (Note: As 751st Air Group.); Battle of the Bismarck Sea; Operation I-Go; Defence of Rabaul

Commanders
- Notable commanders: Shichiso Miyauchi; Miyoshi Nabeta; Kazuo Nishioka; Toshitaka Itō; Osamu Doki

The Kanoya Air Group (鹿屋海軍航空隊, Kanoya Kaigun Kōkūtai) was an aircraft and airbase garrison unit of the Imperial Japanese Navy Air Service (IJNAS) during the Second Sino-Japanese War and Pacific campaign of World War II. The air group was redesignated as the 751st Air Group on 1 October 1942. On 1 November, the group's fighter unit was redesignated to the 253rd Air Group, while the bomber unit remained the 751st Air Group.

== History ==
The Kanoya Air Group was formed on 1 April 1936 and was the oldest medium bomber (rikko) air group in IJNAS, along with the Kisarazu Air Group. It initially operated from Kanoya on Kyushu and was equipped with Type 96 Mitsubishi G3M medium bombers. They first saw combat during the Second Sino-Japanese War in August 1937. In July 1941, the air group temporarily moved to an airfield near Hankou in Central China to participate in Operation 102, which involved concentrated attacks against targets in Chongqing and Chengdu in West China.

Following the unit's return from Hankou to Kanoya in September 1941, they became the second IJNAS unit (after Takao Air Group) to be equipped with the new Type 1 Mitsubishi G4M medium bombers. In November, they moved to Taiwan, however soon afterwards the unit's main body was transferred to Saigon in French Indochina, leaving a detachment at Taichung. The detachment that stayed on Taiwan participated in the attack on the Philippines.

At the start of Pacific War, Kanoya Air Group was considered the most highly trained medium bomber unit in torpedo attacks. Therefore, its main body at Saigon was selected as the main torpedo attack unit for the attack on the newly arrived British naval Force Z, centered around the battleship HMS Prince of Wales and battlecruiser HMS Repulse. The attack formation of 26 G4M bombers was led by the unit's Hikōtaichō Lieutenant Commander Shichiso Miyauchi, who flew as an observer in the lead aircraft, piloted by Buntaichō Lieutenant Miyoshi Nabeta. By the time they arrived at the area off the south-east coast of Malay Peninsula, where the ships were heading back to Singapore, the Royal Navy ships had been already attacked by the older G3M bombers from Mihoro Air Group and Genzan Air Group. A high-level attack by Mihoro's bombers hit Repulse with a single 250 kg bomb that caused minor damage, while Genzan's bombers hit Prince of Walse with two torpedoes that hindered her steering ability. Kanoya's torpedo attack then hit Repulse with four torpedoes and finished off Prince of Walse with additional four torpedoes. The attack sank both battleships at the cost of two Kanoya bombers.

In January 1942, the detachment first moved to the newly captured airfield at Davao and then to Kendari and participated in the invasion of Dutch East Indies, while the main body supported the Japanese invasion of Malaya and Singapore. On 19 February, the detachment participated in the Bombing of Darwin, where they hit the harbor one and a half hours after the carrier strike. In March, the main body and the detachment both returned to Japan where they reunited.

On 12 September 1942, Kanoya Air Group's advanced detachment of medium bombers led by Buntaichō Lieutenant Osamu Doki moved to Rabaul on New Britain to participate in Guadalcanal campaign and New Guinea campaign. The rest of the group's bombers under Hikōtaichō Lieutenant Commander Kazuo Nishioka moved to Kavieng on New Ireland on 16 September. On the same day, part of its fighter unit led by Hikōtaichō Lieutenant Toshitaka Itō moved to Rabaul for temporary duty with Tainan Air Group. The group's bombers participated in major raids against Guadalcanal on 13 and 28 September, and against Port Moresby on 21 September. In the meantime, its fighters participated in an escort mission on 28 September and a fighter sweep against Guadalcanal on 29 September. On 1 October the unit was redesignated to 751st Air Group. Further fighter sweeps against Guadalcanal were conducted on 3 and 9 October and an escort on 23 October, while the bombers participated in major raids on 11, 13 and 14 October. On 1 November, the group's fighter unit was redesignated to the 253rd Air Group, while the bomber unit remained the 751st Air Group.

On 30 January, the 751st Air Group bombers were involved in the Battle of Rennell Island, where they were led by Lieutenant Commander Kazuo Nishioka and they torpedoed the cruiser Chicago. In April 1943, the unit participated in Operation I-Go. By mid-1943, the high rate of attrition forced the unit to reduce the number of aircrew per bomber from seven to five, which typically meant there was no co-pilot. 253rd Air Group fighters saw heavy fighting during the defence of Rabaul in late 1943 and early 1944. After US carrier force raided Truk Lagoon in February 1944, all air units were withdrawn from Rabaul area, including 751st Air Group.

== Personnel Assigned ==
=== Commanding Officers ===
- According to Naval Resignation Bulletins by the Ministry of the Navy.

==== First Generation ====
- Capt. Shizue Ishii (39) - 1 April 1936 - 15 November 1937
- Capt. Munetaka Sakamaki (41) - 15 November 1937 - 15 December 1938
- Capt. Sueo Obayashi (43) - 15 December 1938 - 15 October 1940
- Capt. Naoshiro Fujiyoshi (44) - 15 October 1940 - 1 April 1942
- Capt. Katsuji Kondo (46) - 1 April 1942 - 27 September 1942
- Capt. Toshihiko Odawara (48) - 27 September 1942 - 1 October 1942 as C.O. of 751st Naval Air Group - 29 March 1943
- Lt.Cdr. Naohiro Sata (51) - 29 March 1943 - promoted Captain on 1 May 1944 - 15 June 1944
- Capt. Ryozo Otani (51) - 15 June 1944 - 10 July 1944, disbanded.

==== Second Generation ====
- Capt. Fujino Hiroshi (47) – 1 October 1942 – 1 November 1942
- Capt. Takatsugu Kan'ichi (44) – 1 November 1942 – 1 January 1943
- Capt. Moritama Hiroshi (45) – 1 January 1943 – 15 June 1944
- Capt. Sato Rokuro (Eng. 31) – 15 June 1944 – 10 July 1944, reformed Toyohashi Naval Air Group.

=== Executive Officers ===
- VACANT from 1 October 1942 – 1 November 1942; from 1 November 1942 onward, the position was held jointly by the Commanding Officer.

=== Maintenance Officers ===
- Lt. (Eng.) / Lt. Saeki Tadao (Reserve) – 1 October 1942 – 15 March 1943 (Engineer officers were made line officers on 1 November 1942.)
- Lt. Sakamoto Yoshiteru (Reserve) – 15 March 1943 – 10 October 1943
- LtCdr. Oda Shichiro (Eng. 37) – 10 October 1943 – 1 December 1943 (Position of Maintenance Officer abolished.)

=== Surgeons ===
- Cdr. (Med.) Miyahara Kunio (1922) – 1 October 1942 – 1 November 1943
- Cdr. (Med.) Kawaida Ken (1922) – 1 November 1943 – 1 January 1944
- LtCdr. (Med.) Kotake Sueo (1933) – 1 January 1944 – 10 July 1944

=== Paymasters ===
- Lt. (Pay.) Mitsui Ichiro (1940) – 1 October 1942 – 15 May 1943
- Lt. (Pay.) Kitawaki Nobuo (1940) – 15 May 1943 – 10 July 1944

=== Communications Officers ===
- Lt. Fujiwara Hiromichi (66) – 1 October 1942 – 5 June 1944
- LtCdr. Tsuji Yoshinobu (Special Duty 5) – 5 June 1944 – 10 July 1944

=== Air Officers ===
- Cdr. Kusumoto Ikuto (52) – 1 October 1942 – 1 November 1942
- Cdr. Kawaguchi Susumu (52) – 1 November 1942 – 12 December 1942
- Cdr. Sugiyama Toshikazu (51) – 12 December 1942 – 5 November 1943
- LtCdr. Asano Takeshi (56) – 5 November 1943 – 1 April 1944
- VACANT – 1 April 1944 – 20 April 1944
- LtCdr. / Cdr. Katsumi Goro (56) – 20 April 1944 – 10 July 1944 (Promoted Commander on 1 May 1944.)
