= William Tennant (Royal Navy officer) =

Royal Navy Admiral (1890–1963)

Admiral Sir William Tennant KCB CBE MVO DL
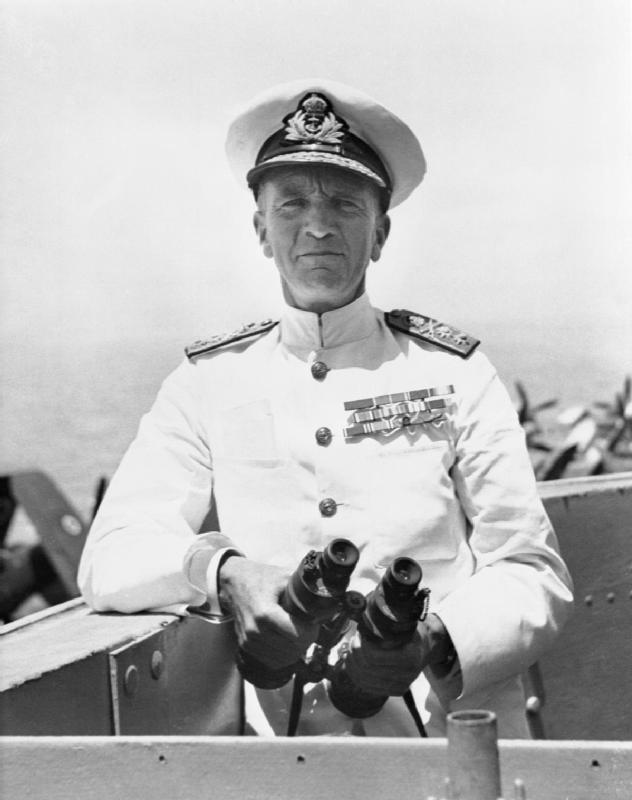
- Vice Admiral Tennant visiting HMS Colossus, May 1945
- Born: William George Tennant; 2 January 1890; Upton-upon-Severn, Worcestershire, England
- Died: 26 July 1963 (aged 73); Worcester, Worcestershire, England
- Military career
- Allegiance: United Kingdom
- Branch: Royal Navy
- Service years: 1905–1949
- Rank: Admiral
- Nickname: "Dunkirk Joe"
- Unit: Force Z
- Commands: HMS Arethusa; HMS Repulse; America and West Indies Station
- Conflicts: First World War; Battle of Jutland; Second World War; Operation Dynamo; Hunt for the Bismarck; Sinking of Prince of Wales and Repulse; Operation Overlord
- Awards: Knight Commander of the Order of the Bath; Commander of the Order of the British Empire; Member of the Royal Victorian Order; Legion of Merit (United States)
- Other work: Lord Lieutenant of Worcestershire

Admiral Sir William George Tennant KCB CBE MVO DL (2 January 1890 – 26 July 1963) was a British naval officer. He was lauded for overseeing the successful evacuation of Dunkirk in 1940. Tennant subsequently served as captain of the battlecruiser HMS Repulse, when she searched for German capital ships in the Atlantic.

He remained in this capacity when the Repulse was sunk by the Japanese along with HMS Prince of Wales in the South China Sea on 10 December 1941, three days after the attack on Pearl Harbor. He later aided in the setup of the Mulberry harbours and the Pluto pipelines, a crucial part of the success of Operation Overlord. He died in 1963.

== Biography ==
Born in Upton-upon-Severn and educated at nearby Hanley Castle Grammar School, Tennant joined the Royal Navy in 1905 at the age of 15, as a naval cadet at Britannia Royal Naval College. He was eventually appointed an acting sub-lieutenant, being confirmed in that rank on 15 December 1909, and was promoted to lieutenant on 30 June 1912, eventually specialising in navigation in 1913.

During the First World War, Tennant first served aboard the destroyers Lizard and Ferret as part of the Harwich Force until 1916, then aboard the cruisers Chatham and Nottingham, as part of the Grand Fleet in 1916, surviving the sinking of the latter during the action of 19 August 1916. He then returned to the Harwich Force to serve aboard the cruiser Concord until 1919.

Tennant was promoted to lieutenant-commander 30 June 1920, and served as Navigating Officer aboard the battlecruiser Renown during the royal tour to India and Japan by Edward, Prince of Wales, between September 1921 and June 1922. He then served as an instructor at HMS Dryad, the navigation school at Portsmouth, before returning to sea in late 1924 to serve as navigating officer of the Repulse for another tour by the Prince of Wales the following year, this time to Africa and South America. For his services Tennant was made a Member of the Royal Victorian Order (Fourth Class) by King George V in November 1925.

Tennant was promoted to commander on 31 December 1925, and spent the next two years posted to the Admiralty, serving in the Operations Division. He served as Executive Officer of the cruiser Sussex in the Mediterranean from March 1929, then on the staff of the Royal Naval Staff College at Greenwich from December 1930. He was promoted to captain on 31 December 1932.

From May 1935 he served as commanding officer of the cruiser Arethusa as part of the 3rd Cruiser Squadron in the Mediterranean, then from July 1937 was an instructor at the Imperial Defence College, London. In August 1939 he was appointed Chief Staff Officer to the First Sea Lord.

== Second World War ==
=== Dunkirk Evacuation ===
On 26 May 1940 Tennant was appointed Senior Naval Officer ashore at Dunkirk, and ordered to Dover, where he took command of a naval party of eight officers and 160 men. Tennant's party was dispatched on board the destroyer Wolfhound to aid in the evacuation of more than 300,000 British and French troops left stranded when France fell to the Nazis. Tennant's task was to organize the men and get them onto the ships waiting to take them. Tennant stayed right up until the last ships left on 2 June, patrolling the beaches of Dunkirk with a megaphone searching for British troops.

Tennant was lauded for his efforts at Dunkirk, and was appointed Companion of the Order of the Bath on 7 June 1940. The ordinary sailors under his command took to calling him "Dunkirk Joe".

=== Captain of the Repulse ===
On 28 June 1940 Tennant became captain of the battlecruiser Repulse, taking part in battles against the German battleships Scharnhorst and Gneisenau, and later in the hunt for the battleship Bismarck.

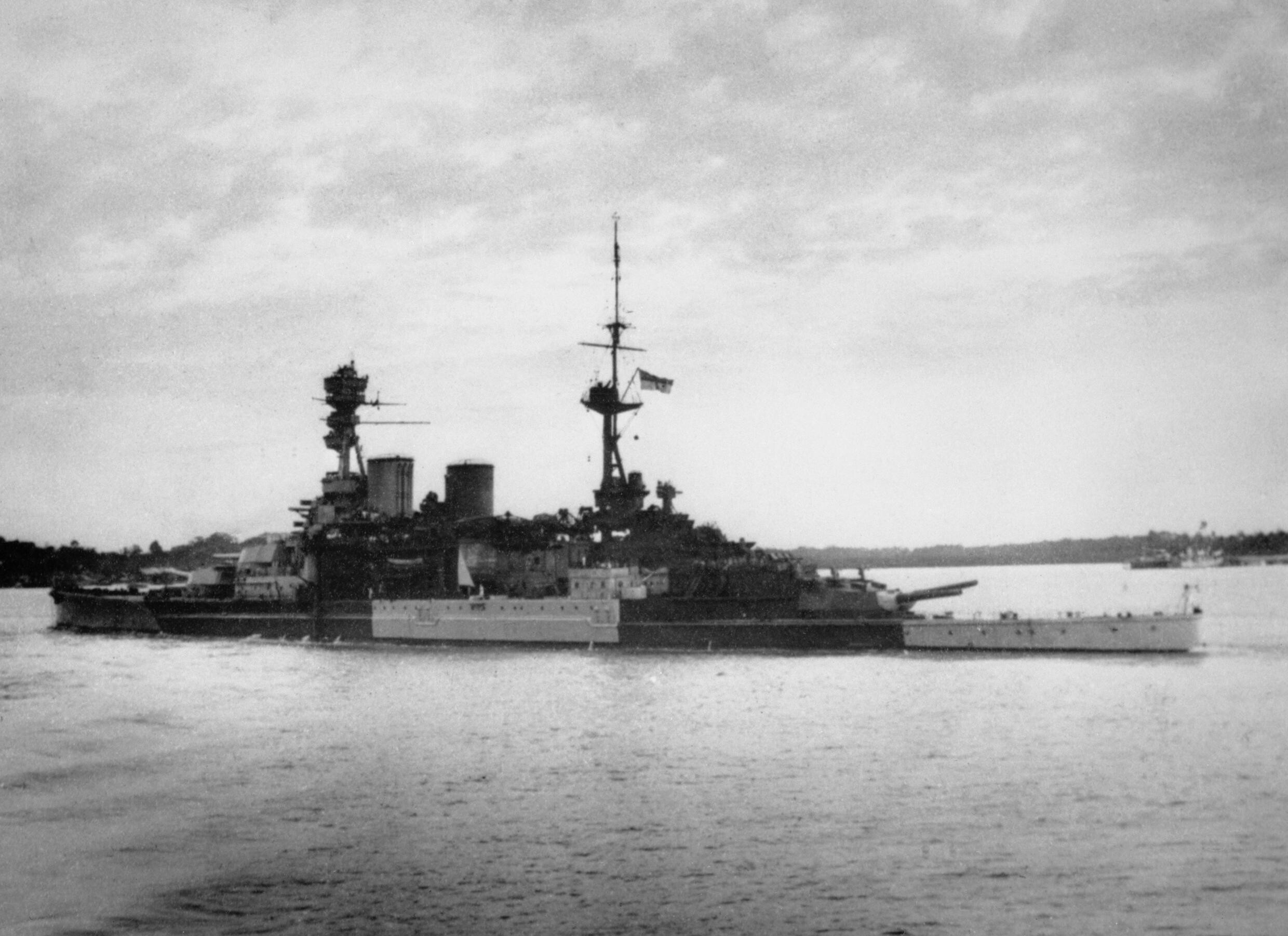
Repulse sails from Singapore on 8 December 1941

Tennant and Repulse joined Admiral Sir Tom Phillips' Force Z, sent to Singapore to counter Japanese advancement in the Pacific, in December 1941. On 8 December, the day after Pearl Harbor, Singapore came under attack by Japanese air units, and Force Z departed for Malaya to attack a Japanese convoy, an operation that was cancelled shortly thereafter. Upon returning to Singapore, they received word of Japanese landings on Malaya, and Force Z - without air cover - made for Malaya to counter them.

On 10 December, the Japanese attacked Force Z. Tennant ably handled Repulse and dodged nineteen torpedoes dropped from Japanese aircraft, while also shooting down several attackers. Nonetheless, Repulse eventually succumbed to a pincer attack and was hit by five torpedoes, sinking within twenty minutes, with great loss of life. The survivors, including Tennant, were rescued by the destroyers Electra and Vampire.

On 6 February 1942, Tennant was promoted to rear-admiral and in February 1943 received a mention in despatches for his part in the Battle of Madagascar.

=== Normandy ===
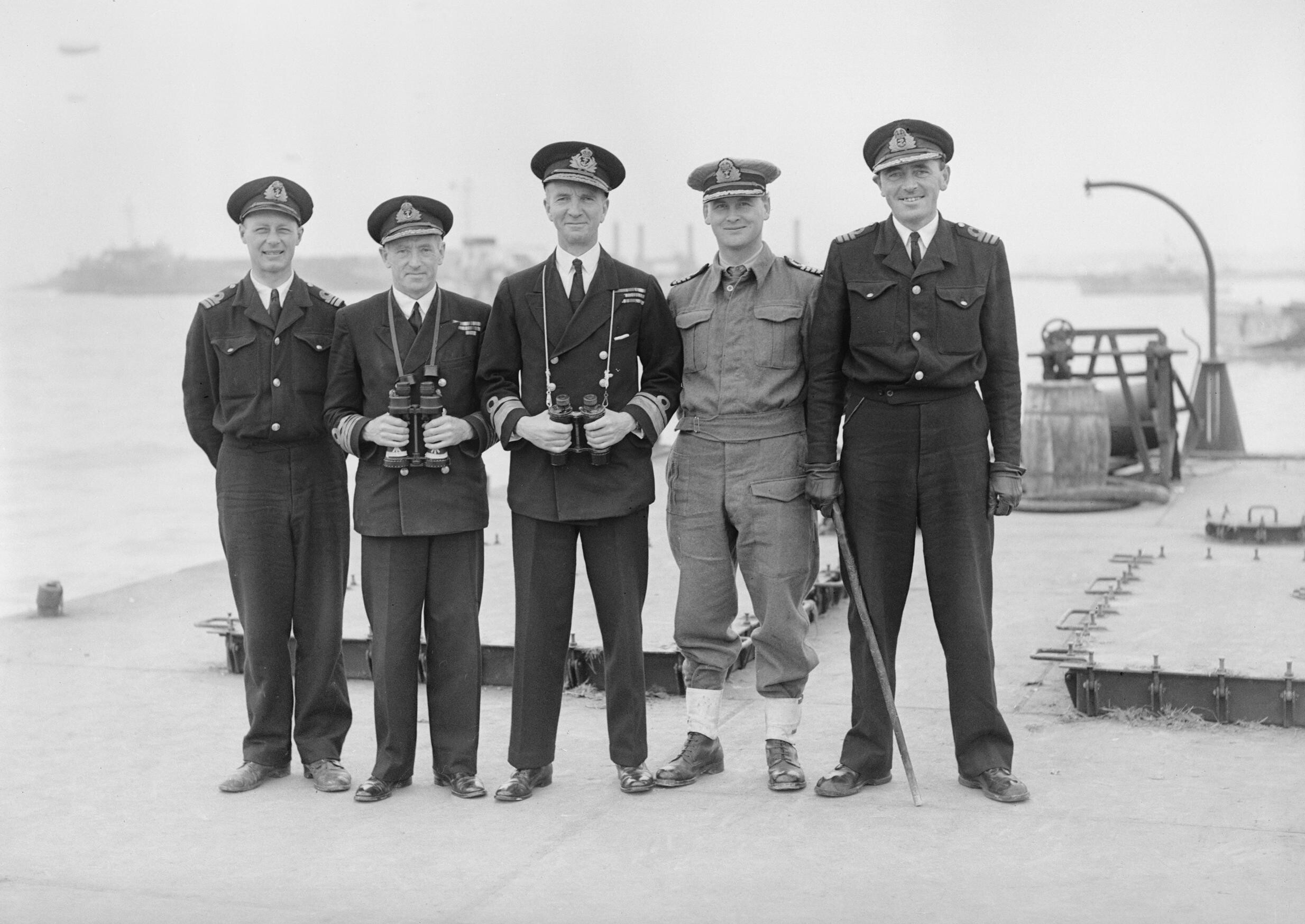
Rear Admiral Tennant (centre) with his officers on Mulberry B, Arromanches, July 1944

In June 1944, Tennant was placed in charge of the naval side of the transport, assembly and setup of the two Mulberry harbours that provided port facilities for the coming invasion of Normandy. In August, he supervised the laying of the Pluto pipelines between France and England, which provided fuel for the Allied expeditionary force. For his efforts in the success of the Normandy invasion, Tennant was appointed Commander of the Order of the British Empire by King George VI and was awarded the United States Legion of Merit.

== Post-war service ==
Tennant was promoted to vice-admiral on 27 July 1945, and upgraded to Knight Commander of the Order of the Bath in December 1945 for his war service. Appointed commander of the America and West Indies Station in 1946, he was promoted to admiral on 22 October 1948, and remained there until he retired in August 1949. In 1950, he was named Lord Lieutenant of Worcestershire, in which capacity he served until his death at the Worcester Royal Infirmary in 1963.

== In film and fiction ==
In the 2004 BBC series Dunkirk, Captain Tennant is played by Adrian Rawlins. In the 2017 Christopher Nolan film Dunkirk, the character of "Commander Bolton" draws on the accomplishments of Captain Tennant during the evacuation.

== Honours ==
=== United Kingdom ===
Honour	Abbreviation/Title	Date Awarded
Member of the Royal Victorian Order	MVO	16 October 1925
Companion of the Order of the Bath	CB	7 June 1940
Commander of the Order of the British Empire	CBE	28 November 1944
Knight Commander of the Order of the Bath	KCB	18 December 1945

=== Awards from other countries ===
Award	Country
Croix de guerre 1939-1945	France
Légion d'honneur, Officier	France
Grand Cross of the Order of George I	Greece
Commander of the Legion of Merit	United States

Military offices
Preceded by Sir Irvine Glennie	Commander-in-Chief, America and West Indies Station; 1946–1949	Succeeded by Sir Richard Symonds-Tayler
Honorary titles
Preceded by John Lyttelton, 9th Viscount Cobham	Lord Lieutenant of Worcestershire; 1950–1963	Succeeded by Charles Lyttelton, 10th Viscount Cobham
