= Genzan Air Group =

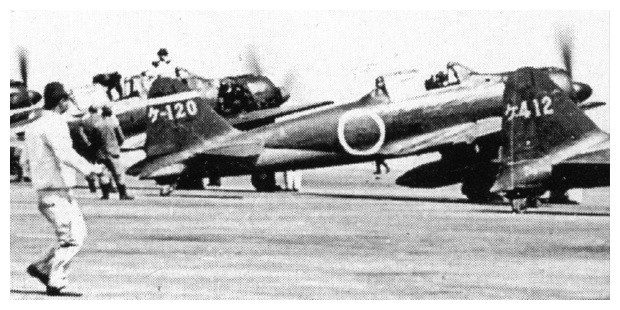
- Genzan A6M2b fighters at Genzan (Wonsan), Korea in April 1945.
- Active: 15 Nov 1940 – 1 Nov 1942; 15 Aug 1944 – the end of war
- Country: Empire of Japan
- Allegiance: Imperial Japanese Navy
- Branch: Imperial Japanese Navy Air Service
- Type: Naval aviation unit
- Role: Bomber and fighter support (1940); Training (1944)
- Garrison/HQ: Wonsan, Korea; Hankou, China; Saigon, French Indochina; Rabaul, New Britain; Kanoya, Japan
- Engagements: Second Sino-Japanese War; Sinking of Prince of Wales and Repulse; Battle of Malaya; Battle of Singapore; Dutch East Indies campaign; New Guinea Campaign; Battle of Okinawa

Insignia
- Identification symbol: ゲン (Gen, 1940, Japan homeland)
- Identification symbol: G (1940, outside Japan homeland)
- Identification symbol: ケ (Ke, 1944)
- Identification symbol: ゲン (Gen, August 1945)

The Genzan Air Group (元山海軍航空隊, Genzan Kaigun Kōkūtai) was an aircraft and airbase garrison unit of the Imperial Japanese Navy Air Service during the Second Sino-Japanese War and Pacific campaign of World War II.

== History ==
The Genzan Air Group was founded on 15 November 1940 at Genzan, Korea, then a part of the Empire of Japan. It was initially a mixed-unit equipped with 33 Type 96 Mitsubishi G3M1 bombers and 25 Type 96 Mitsubishi A5M4 fighters under the command of the Second Air Fleet. On January 15, 1941, it was reassigned to the 22nd Kōkū Sentai and deployed to Hankou in central China.

=== Operations in China ===
While based at Hankou, the bombers of the Genzan Air Group were primarily assigned to strategic bombing missions in Sichuan Province, while the fighters were assigned to combat air patrol and ground support missions in support of Imperial Japanese Army operations. The Genzan Air Group was withdrawn from China in September, 1941, returning to its home base at Genzan for training, and at the end of October, 1941 was forward deployed to Takao in Taiwan.

== Operations in Southeast Asia ==
With the bombing of Pearl Harbor and the outbreak of the Pacific War, the Genzan Air Group was deployed to Saigon, French Indochina. The group was a key participant in the sinking of the British capital ships HMS Prince of Wales (53) and HMS Repulse (1916) off the coast of Malaya on 10 December 1941, losing one aircraft and its crew during the battle.

On January 22, 1942, bombers from the Genzan Air Group attacked Kallang Airport in Singapore, and subsequently provided air support for Japanese offensives in Malaya including the landings at Endau. At the end of February, the unit was transferred to Bangkok and assigned to patrols over the Indian Ocean; however, facilities at Bangkok were not satisfactory and the unit was soon reassigned to Palembang in Sumatra in the Netherlands East Indies, with some aircraft dispersed to Kuching in Sarawak.

On May 1, 1942, Genzan's flying unit was redeployed to Rabaul, New Britain to support the Japanese campaign in New Guinea. The group participated in the Battle of the Coral Sea, without success, and made numerous bombing attacks against Port Moresby.

In July, after the cancellation of Operation Mo, the unit was withdrawn to Japan and was based at Misawa, Aomori for training. Its fighter unit was detached and redesignated as the 252 Kōkūtai in September. The Genzan's flying unit was disbanded by being redesignated as the 755 Kōkūtai on 1 November 1942. Losses in daylight anti-shipping bombing raids prompted most air groups to switch to night tactics.

In the night of February 19, 1944, a lone Rikko bomber of the air group torpedoed and badly damaged the enemy carrier USS Intrepid in a night-time attack.

== Personnel ==
=== Commanding officers ===
- Capt. Izawa Ishinosuke (43) - 15 November 1940 - 1 October 1941
- Cdr. / Capt. Maeda Takanari (47) – 1 October 1941 – 20 September 1942 (Promoted Captain on 15 October 1941.)
- Cdr. Yamashita Sakae (49) – 20 September 1942 – 1 November 1942

=== Executive officers ===
- Cdr. Minematsu Iwao (48) – 15 November 1940 – 10 October 1941
- VACANT – 10 October 1941 – 1 November 1942

=== Maintenance officers ===
- LtCdr. (Eng.) Hata Nobukuma (Eng. 31) – 15 November 1940 – 1 September 1941
- LtCdr. (Eng.) Azuma Tetsuo (Eng. 33) – 1 September 1941 – 25 September 1942
- Lt. (Eng.) Kataoka Shoichi (Eng. 42) – 25 September 1942 – 1 November 1942

=== Surgeons ===
- LtCdr. (Med.) Masuoka Satoru (1927) - 15 November 1940 – 10 April 1942
- LtCdr. (Med.) Takeyasu Sueharu (1930) – 10 April 1942 – 13 October 1942
- LtCdr. (Med.) Suzuki Keiichiro (1928) – 13 October 1942 – 1 November 1942

=== Paymasters ===
- LtCdr. (Pay.) Kishida Mizunari (Pay. 16) – 15 November 1940 – 20 September 1941
- Lt. (Pay.) Sudo Hiroshi (Pay. 24) – 20 September 1941 – 5 August 1942
- Lt. (Pay.) Nagai Hora (Pay. Aux. 2) – 5 August 1942 – 1 November 1942

=== Communications officers ===
- LtCdr. Ikeda Iwao (55) – 15 November 1940 – 15 September 1941
- LtCdr. Minekawa Minoru (57) – 15 September 1941 – 1 November 1942

=== Air officers ===
- Cdr. Asada Masahiko (52) – 15 November 1940 – 1 September 1941
- LtCdr. Sonokawa Kameo (52) – 1 September 1941 – 1 April 1942
- LtCdr. Tokoro Shigehachiro (51) – 1 April 1942 – 1 November 1942
