= Force Z =

World War II British naval squadron

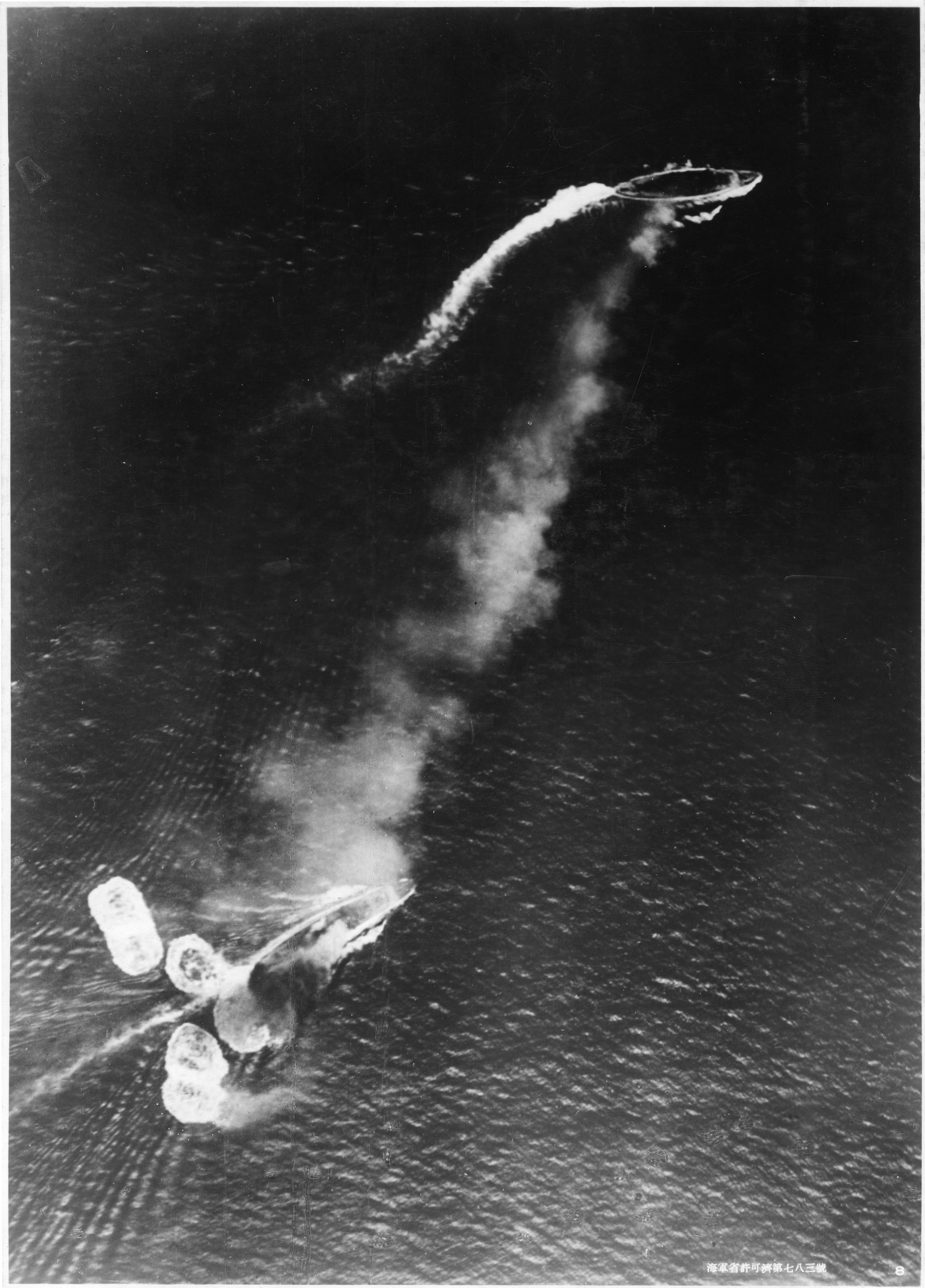
- The loss of HMS Prince of Wales and HMS Repulse, 10 December 1941. Photograph taken from a Japanese aircraft during the initial high-level bombing attack. Repulse, near the bottom of the view, has just been hit by a bomb.
- Active: 1941
- Country: United Kingdom
- Branch: Royal Navy
- Size: 2 × capital ships 4 × destroyers
- Garrison/HQ: Singapore
- Engagements: Sinking of Prince of Wales and Repulse aka Battle of Malaya

Commanders
- Notable commanders: Admiral Sir Tom Phillips † (Flag Officer); Captain John Leach † (HMS Prince of Wales); Captain William Tennant (HMS Repulse)

Force Z was a British naval squadron during the Second World War, consisting of the battleship HMS Prince of Wales, the battlecruiser HMS Repulse and accompanying destroyers. Assembled in 1941, the purpose of the group was to reinforce the British colonial garrisons in the Far East and deter Japanese expansion into British possessions, particularly Malaya and Singapore. Lack of aircraft to protect Force Z, underestimation of the Japanese armed forces, and the political rather than naval motive for its deployment are blamed for the destruction of the force.

== Background ==
=== Strategy for Far East reinforcement ===
Inter-war British planning for a war against the Empire of Japan sought to defend British interests in China (the "offensive" strategy), and to defend imperial lines of communications, particularly through the Indian Ocean (the "defensive strategy"). Singapore was chosen as the main Royal Navy (RN) base. It put the fleet within steaming range of China. The base was also on the "Malay Barrier", the eastern forward defence zone for the Indian Ocean, although strictly speaking Singapore was not required to pursue a defensive strategy. In the 1920s the RN could reinforce the Far East fleet from Britain and the Mediterranean Sea to sufficiently pursue the offensive strategy. By the late 1930s, war with Germany and a stronger Imperial Japanese Navy (IJN) had to be considered; in the event of a European war fewer naval forces would be available for the Far East fleet; reinforcement would arrive incrementally and the total end strength would suffice only for the defensive strategy.

In strategic discussions during 1940, Britain requested naval assistance from the United States in the Atlantic (against Germany) and the Malay Barrier (specifically to Singapore, against Japan) in the event that the United States entered the war. The required US naval forces would come from the Pacific Fleet. The Pacific Fleet was not large enough to fulfill both missions. The Americans had misgivings about deploying the Pacific Fleet to Singapore and chose the Atlantic. The Allies agreed that the Atlantic theatre was paramount and the choice was affirmed the next year at the ABC-1 talks on American, British, and Canadian (ABC) military coordination in the event of US entry into World War II.

Still, the British wanted a naval force at Singapore, which they believed was the only place where the vital Indian Ocean trade routes and the eastern British Dominions could be adequately covered. To accomplish this, American naval forces arriving in the Atlantic would replace British naval forces, freeing British naval forces to redeploy eastwards. In February 1941, the RN planned the creation and movement of the Eastern Fleet to the Indian Ocean and Singapore based on this substitution.

The reinforcement of the Far East by the Eastern Fleet would occur in two phases. The first phase moved, at the earliest possible time, a minimum force into the Indian Ocean able to counter Japanese cruisers engaged in commerce raiding; the first phase would occur early in the Atlantic substitution. The second phase moved the bulk of the Eastern Fleet to Singapore or - if Singapore had fallen - the eastern Indian Ocean after American naval mobilization in the Atlantic was complete. The transfer of the Eastern Fleet was projected to be completed 80 days after the entry of the United States into the war. The basic structure of the plan remained unchanged from February 1941 to early December 1941, although the details were regularly revised.

By August 1941, phase 1 was planned as Force H, joined as soon as possible by the phase 2 battleships, the Nelson-class and Revenge-class battleships. The limiting factor to forming the full Eastern Fleet was a shortage of cruisers and destroyers. The first British capital ships to arrive in the Indian Ocean were the battleship HMS Revenge in mid-September, and the battlecruiser HMS Repulse in early October.

=== Return to offensive plans ===
The United States did not wait to enter the war to become active in the Atlantic. By August 1941, there was sufficient American participation in the Atlantic to make a peacetime execution of the British Far East naval reinforcement plan feasible. In September, it was proposed that phase 1 could be made more powerful, and the core of the Eastern Fleet could be in place by January 1942. The shortage of destroyers would prevent the deployment of capital ships beyond the Malay Barrier, but retaining capital ships in the Indian Ocean would free cruisers to operate beyond the Malay Barrier.

With such a powerful force, the RN returned to offensive plans against Japan in September. At ABC-1, the United States rejected reinforcing the United States Asiatic Fleet with a US aircraft carrier task force. The new RN plan resurrected the concept. Singapore would be the Eastern Fleet's main repair base. Manila, in the Philippines, would be its forward operating base come wartime. It would over-optimistically rely on Royal Air Force (RAF) cover in Malaya, and the major American air reinforcement of the Philippines announced at the Atlantic Conference; the latter factor may not even have been considered by RN strategists.

=== British assessment of Japanese intentions ===
In July, the Japanese moved into southern Indochina. In response, the British reassessed Japanese intentions from August to early September, which came to a number of conclusions. The Japanese were waiting for the outcome of the German invasion of the Soviet Union before deciding on a northern or southern expansion strategy, but were concentrating resources in anticipation of the former. Malaya was vulnerable due to the Japanese encroachment in Indochina, but was not immediately threatened due to the northern option and the monsoon season, which would prevent amphibious landings on Malaya until February 1942. The assessment was fatally flawed. It underestimated economic factors driving Japanese toward the southern strategy. It also failed to appreciate that the Gulf of Thailand was reasonably sheltered against the monsoon.

As a result, air reinforcement to Malaya was deferred; aircraft went to the Middle East, and to the Soviet Union as aid. Overall, Japan seemed at such a disadvantage that increased military deterrence might still prevent war or delay its onset.

=== Selecting Prince of Wales ===
In late August, Prime Minister Winston Churchill discussed Far East reinforcement with Admiral Dudley Pound, the First Sea Lord. Churchill proposed augmenting phase 1 with a King George V-class battleship. The United States declared its intent to deploy modern battleships to the Atlantic at the Atlantic Conference in early August; this would make a King George V-class ship available. Pound favoured keeping the King George Vs in Britain.

Pound proposed basing the Nelsons, the battlecruiser HMS Renown, and an aircraft carrier at Singapore. This would be for deterrent value in peacetime, to be withdrawn to Ceylon on the onset of war; the British believed a wartime fleet at Singapore had to be competitive with a major portion of the IJN. Interestingly, Pound did not envision an aircraft carrier in the Far East until spring 1942.

In meetings on 17 and 20 October, the British Defence Committee formally discussed Far East naval reinforcement in response to the fall of the moderate Konoe government on 16 October. In agreement with August-September assessment of Japanese intentions, Churchill and his cabinet favoured the deployment of a modern battleship for deterrent effect. The RN, as part of its offensive strategy, planned to send the Nelson and Revenge-class battleships to Singapore, but the Nelsons could not deploy. HMS Nelson was damaged in the Mediterranean Sea in late-September. Crew leave prevented HMS Rodney from deploying until mid-December, and a gun refit scheduled from February to May 1942 was required before she could conduct further operations. With working up, the earliest either could reach the Far East was August 1942. The King George V-class HMS Prince of Wales was, aside from the Revenges, the only worked-up battleship that could sail east before Spring 1942. On 20 October, the Committee decided to send Prince of Wales to Cape Town, South Africa. Once at Cape Town, a review would decide whether to send the ship onward to Singapore; this would keep Prince of Wales available to respond to an emergency in home waters.

Churchill requested an aircraft carrier for Force Z on 17 October, but nothing came of this; the earliest available carrier would be HMS Indomitable in November after working up. Contrary to post-war accounts, Indomitable was not allocated to Force Z. Neither Admiralty plans during the period, nor the secret session of the Parliament of the United Kingdom on 19 December concerning the loss of Force Z, nor the 7 December tabulation of current and intended fleet strength in the Far East, allocate the carrier to the Eastern Fleet. The carrier did not receive any orders to this effect prior to grounding in Kingston, Jamaica, on 2 November, at the start of a three-week work-up. Joining Force Z by 8 December would have required no grounding and abandoning the work-up.

== Prince of Wales sails to Singapore ==
Prince of Wales and the escorting destroyers HMS Electra, Express, and HMS Hesperus, were formed into Force G in Britain; they sailed from Greenock on 25 October 1941. The group was commanded by Admiral Sir Tom Phillips, who had played a major role in shaping naval strategy in the Far East. Hesperus was temporarily assigned from Western Approaches Command. Three days later HMS Legion also temporarily joined the escort while Electra and Express detached to refuel at Ponta Delgada in the Azores. Hesperus and Legion left Force G the following day with the return of the other destroyers. Force G refuelled at Freetown on 5 November and arrived at Cape Town early on the 16 November.

On 2 November, Churchill was notified that Pound intended to conduct the review agreed upon on 20 October before Force G arrived at Cape Town. Pound never conducted the review. The Admiralty, in accordance with its offensive plans, was committed to the move to Singapore before Prince of Wales sailed. On 21 October, the Admiralty informed relevant naval commands that the battleship was on route to Singapore. Once Force G sailed, the Admiralty sought to expedite the transit. On 6 November, Phillips expected to stay in Cape Town for seven days, and arrive at Singapore on 13 December. On 11 November, the Admiralty formally ordered Prince of Wales to combine with Repulse at Ceylon before proceeding to Singapore. The orders also suggested - with reservations from Churchill - that the battleship might abandon its escort in the interest of speed; consequently, Force G remained in Cape Town for only two days. Up to 5 October, Churchill still believed the decision to move Prince of Wales beyond Cape Town was still under review, and accepted Pound's advice and decisions; Churchill was unaware that the Admiralty had readopted an offensive stance the previous October.

British plans to provide media coverage of the arrival of Force G at Cape Town for propaganda and deterrence were disrupted by the shortened duration of the visit. Interviews of ships crew and visits by photographers were cancelled. Japanese diplomats reported the visit on 19 November; thereafter the Japanese expected Prince of Wales to arrive at Singapore at the end of November.

Force G departed Cape Town on the afternoon of 18 November. It refuelled at Mauritius and Port T, Addu Atoll on the journey eastwards. It arrived at Ceylon on 29 November and was joined by Repulse, and the destroyers HMS Encounter and HMS Jupiter; the destroyers were transfers from the Mediterranean Fleet. Phillips disembarked and flew ahead to Singapore to meet with local commanders; on 4 December he also flew to the Philippines to meet with American commanders. Force G finally arrived at Singapore on 2 December and was redesignated to Force Z on 8 December at the outbreak of war.

== Air cover ==
Phillips had requested fighter protection before he left and was told it was not possible. However the reply to his request did not make it clear that the reply only applied to the morning of the 10th off Sigora, and he may have had the mistaken impression that fighter protection would not be available generally. And two proposals to provide daylight fighter cover had previously been turned down by Phillips and his staff.

Tim Vigors of No. 453 Squadron RAAF was bitter about the loss: writing I reckon this must have been the last battle in which the Navy reckoned they could get along without the RAF. A pretty damned costly was of learning …. I had worked out a plan with the liasion officer on the Prince of Wales by which I could keep six aircraft over him all daylight hours within 60 miles of the east coast to a point north of Khota Bharu. This plan was turned down by Admiral Phillips. Had I been allowed to put it into effect I am sure the ships would not have been sunk. Six fighters could have made one hell of a mess of even 50 or 60 slow and unescorted torpedo-bombers.... As we could do nothing else, we kept virtually the whole squadron at readiness at Sembawang while the fleet was out. I was actually sitting in my cockpit when the signal eventually reached us that the Fleet was being attacked. Phillips had known that he was being shadowed the night before, and also at dawn that day. He did not call for air support. He was attacked and still did not call for help. Eventually it was the captain of "Repulse" who called for air support just before his ship sunk.

Wilfred Clouston of No. 488 Squadron RNZAF and his two flight commanders John Noble MacKenzie and John Hutcheson had formulated Get Mobile a plan to provide air cover off the coast during daylight by "leapfrogging" flights up and down the coast using the many airfields available. They presented the plan at an Air Operations meeting but it was rejected out of hand by the naval personnel.

British air forces in Malaya were insufficient to provide full air cover to Force Z. Poor pre-war forecasts of Japanese intentions caused the deferment of air reinforcement, and by the time war was likely it was impossible to provide sufficient reinforcement in time.

== Final deployment and loss ==
Phillips ordered Force Z to sortie on 8 December against Japanese amphibious landings on Malaya in the Gulf of Thailand. Encounter and Jupiter were out of action with defects and were replaced by the First World War destroyers HMAS Vampire and HMS Tenedos. Prince of Wales and Repulse were sunk by Japanese aircraft on 10 December 1941, becoming the first capital ships moving at sea to be sunk solely by enemy aircraft.

Phillips also failed to make full use of intelligence resources. As a result, he grossly underestimated the scale of attack, and believed that the majority of enemy attack aircraft would be level bombers rather than land-based naval torpedo bombers.

== See also ==
- Force B
- Force H
- Force K
