= Japanese air raids on Australia =

Japanese air attacks on Australia in the Pacific War

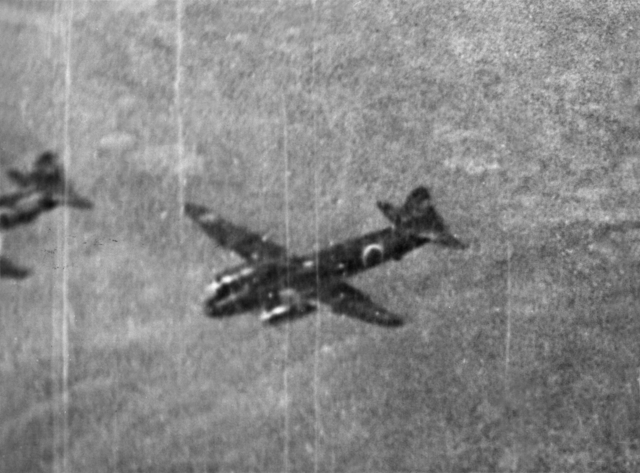
An Australian gun camera photograph of two Japanese Mitsubishi G4M2 "Betty" medium bombers of 753rd Air Group during a raid on Darwin in June 1943.

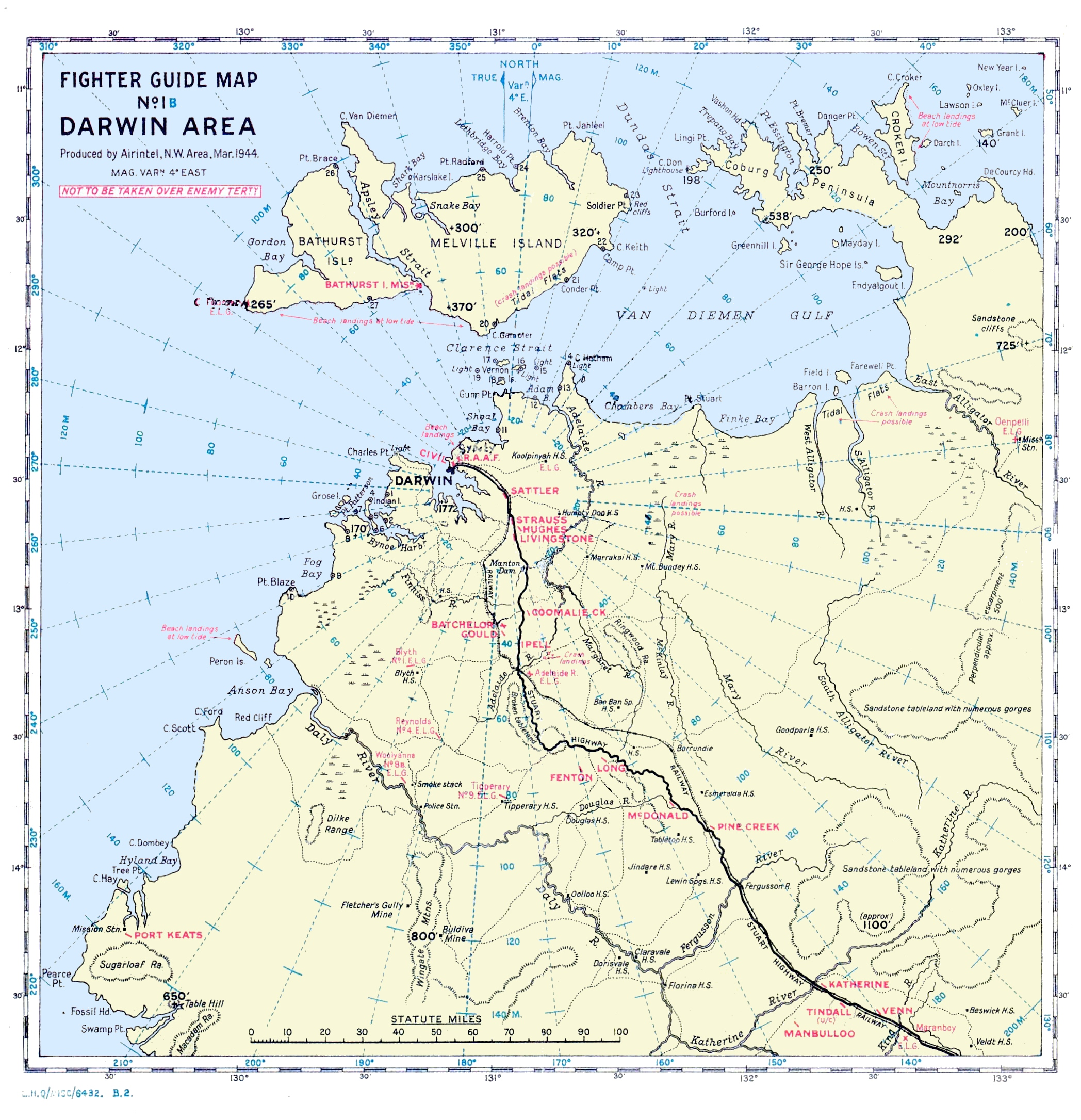
"Fighter Guide Map No. 1B, Darwin Area", March 1944. Produced for air defence purposes by the Royal Australian Air Force. The map includes many of the air fields which were targeted by Japanese aircraft.

During the Pacific War, the Imperial Japanese Navy Air Force and Imperial Japanese Army Air Force conducted a campaign of aerial bombings, or air raids, against the Australian mainland, as well as offshore islands and coastal shipping. Aerial combat between Australian, Japanese and allied aircraft also took place in the form of dogfighting. At least 111 attacks were recorded between February 1942 and November 1943. These attacks came in various forms; from large-scale raids by medium bombers, to torpedo attacks on ships and strafing runs by fighter aircraft.

In the first and deadliest set of attacks, 262 aircraft attacked Darwin on the morning of 19 February 1942. Killing at least 235 people and causing immense damage, the attacks made hundreds of people homeless and resulted in the abandonment of Darwin as a major naval base.

These attacks were opposed by, and often aimed at, units and personnel from the Royal Australian Air Force (RAAF), Australian Army, Royal Australian Navy, United States Army Air Forces, United States Navy, British Royal Air Force and Royal Netherlands East Indies Air Force. Japanese aircrews also targeted civilian infrastructure, including harbours, airfields, railways, and fuel tanks. Some civilians were killed as a result.

Although the main defence was provided by RAAF and Allied fighters, a number of Australian Army anti-aircraft batteries in northern Australia also defended against Japanese air raids.

== Early Japanese air raids ==
The Japanese conducted a series of air raids on Australia during February and March 1942. These raids sought to prevent the Allies from using bases in northern Australia to contest the conquest of the Netherlands East Indies.

=== The first air raid on Darwin ===
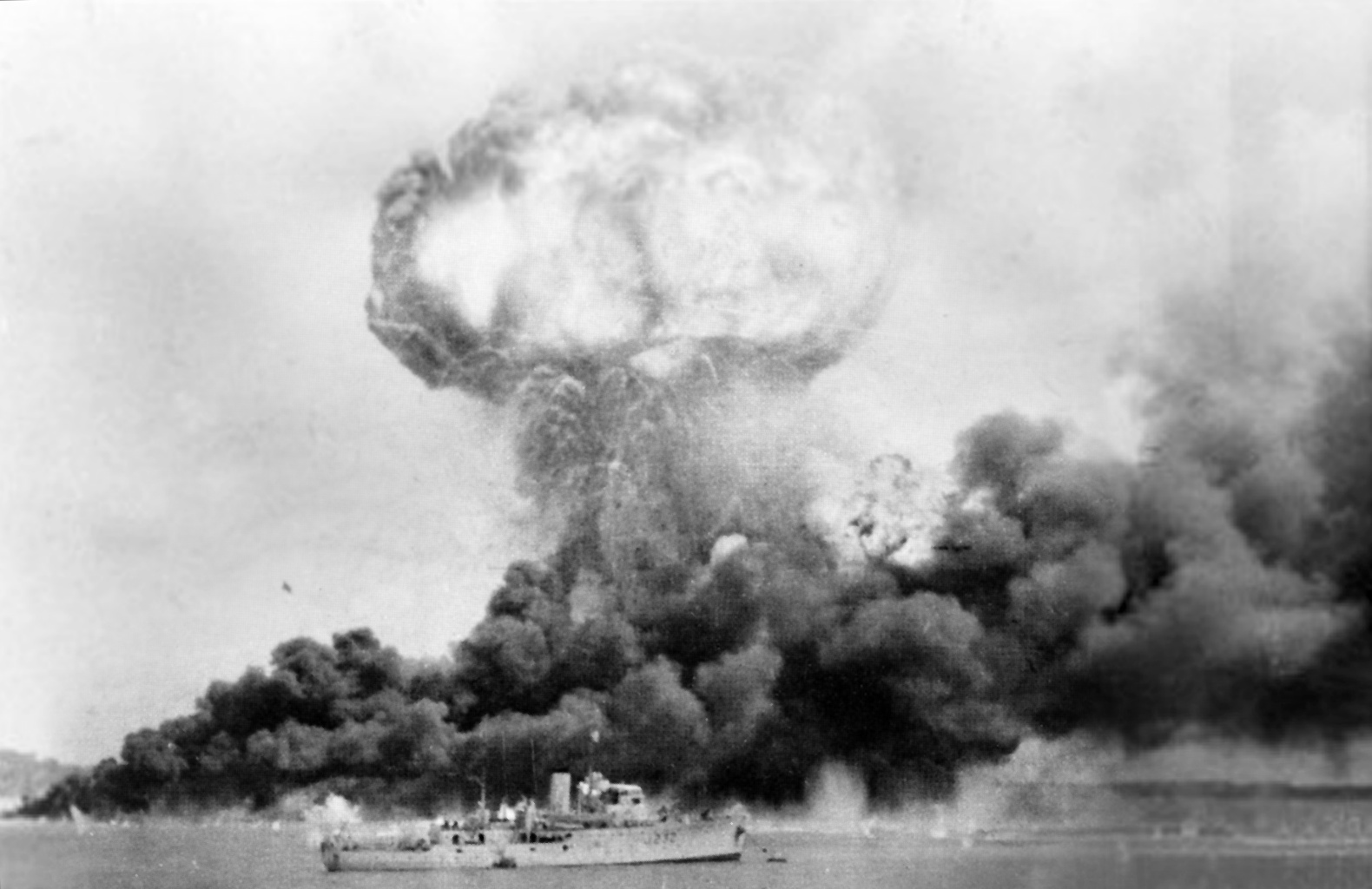
The explosion of the MV Neptuna, hit during the first Japanese air raid on Darwin. In the foreground is HMAS Deloraine, which escaped damage.

The bombing of Darwin on 19 February 1942 was both the first and the largest attack mounted by Japan against mainland Australia, when four Japanese aircraft carriers (Akagi, Kaga, Hiryū and Sōryū) launched a total of 188 aircraft from a position in the Timor Sea. These 188 naval aircraft inflicted heavy damage on Darwin and sank eight ships.

A raid conducted by 54 land-based army bombers later the same day inflicted further damage on the town and RAAF Base Darwin and resulted in the destruction of 20 military aircraft. Allied casualties were 235 killed and between 300 and 400 wounded, the majority of whom were non-Australian Allied sailors. Only four Japanese aircraft, all navy carrier-borne, were confirmed to have been destroyed by Darwin's defenders.

=== The attack on Broome ===
On 3 March 1942, nine Japanese A6M2 Zero fighters attacked the town of Broome, in northern Western Australia. Although Broome was a small town, it had become a significant air base and route of escape for refugees and retreating military personnel, following the Japanese invasion of Java. During the attack, which consisted of strafing runs only by the Zeros, at least 88 Allied civilians and military personnel were killed, and 24 aircraft were lost. As Broome was almost undefended, Japanese losses were light, with only a single Zero being shot down over Broome and another one failing to reach its base.

== Attacks on North Queensland, July 1942 ==
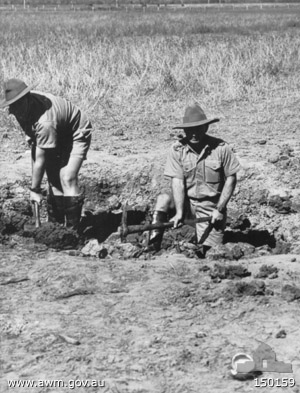
Two Australian soldiers searching for fragments of a bomb dropped during the third raid on Townsville.

In late July 1942, Japanese naval flying boats conducted four small air raids on the north Queensland city of Townsville and the town of Mossman. Townsville, which was an important military base, was raided by Japanese Kawanishi H8K1 "Emily" flying boats operating from Rabaul on three nights in late July 1942. On the night of 25/26 July, the city was attacked by two flying boats but did not suffer any damage, as the six bombs dropped by these aircraft fell into the sea.

Townsville was attacked for the second time in the early hours of 28 July when a single flying boat dropped eight bombs, which landed in bushland outside the city. Six P-39 Airacobras unsuccessfully attempted to intercept the Japanese aircraft. The third raid on Townsville occurred in the early hours of 29 July when a single flying boat again attacked the city, dropping seven bombs into the sea and an eighth which fell on an agricultural research station at Oonoonba, damaging a coconut plantation. This aircraft was intercepted by four Airacobras and was damaged. The fourth raid on north Queensland occurred on the night of 31 July when a single flying boat dropped a bomb, which exploded near a house outside of Mossman, injuring a child.

== List of attacks by date ==
=== 1942 ===
==== February ====
19
Bombing of Darwin
(10:00) Attack by 188 carrier-based aircraft at Darwin, Northern Territory (NT)
(11:55) Attack by 54 land-based high-level bombers at Darwin, NT
Bathurst Island, NT
20
(11:30) Off Cape Londonderry, Western Australia (WA). MV Koolama damaged by a Kawanishi H6K5 flying boat. Attacked again at 13:30 and severely damaged, with injuries to three passengers.
21
Rulhieres Bay, WA (later known as Koolama Bay) Koolama attacked again, no damage or injuries.

==== March ====
3
(09:20) Broome, WA. Attack on Broome: a strafing raid by nine A6M2 Zeros. At least 88 people were killed and 24 Allied aircraft were destroyed. A Sikh pilot of the Royal Indian Air Force Flying Officer Manmohan Singh, in one of the RAF Catalina flying boats died. He was the first Indian casualty on Australian soil.
(~10:30) Carnot Bay, WA. PK-AFV (Pelikaan)—a Douglas DC-3 airliner owned by KLM—was shot down by Zeros returning from the attack on Broome. It crash-landed 50 mi (80 km) north of Broome. Four passengers were killed. Diamonds worth £150,000–300,000 were lost or stolen following the crash.
Wyndham, WA. Strafing attack by Zeroes. No casualties. Koolama, which is in port by this time (see above), sinks as an indirect result of the attack.
Wyndham Airfield, WA
4
Wreckage and passengers from PK-AFV attacked again by a Kawanishi H6K5 flying boat, no damage or casualties.
(14:00) Darwin RAAF Airfield, NT
14
Horn Island, Queensland (Qld)
16
(13:30) Darwin RAAF Airfield and Bagot, NT
17
Darwin, NT
18
Horn Island, Qld
19
(11:40) Darwin (Myilly Point and Larrakeyah), NT
20
Broome Airfield, WA. Attack by Mitsubishi G4M2 "Betty" medium bombers. One civilian killed. Minor damage to airfield.
Derby, WA
22
(00:51) Darwin, NT
22
Katherine, NT. One civilian killed. (Furthest air raid into the Australian interior – over 200 kilometres (120 mi) from the coast).
23
Darwin, NT
Wyndham, WA (two raids)
28
(12:30) Darwin RAAF Airfield, NT
30
(05:40?) Darwin RAAF Airfield, NT
30
Darwin RAAF Airfield, NT
31
(13:20) Darwin RAAF Airfield, NT
(22:19) Darwin RAAF Airfield, NT

==== April ====
2
(15:30) Darwin (Harvey St, McMinn St, Shell Oil Tanks), NT
Sattler Airfield, NT
4
(13:48) Darwin Civil Airfield and Parap Hotel, NT
5
(12:29) Darwin RAAF Airfield, NT
25
(14:00) Darwin RAAF Airfield, NT
27
(12:07) Darwin RAAF Airfield, NT
30
Horn Island, QLD

==== June ====
13
(11:52) Darwin RAAF Airfield, NT
14
(13:14) Darwin (town area), NT
15
(12:20) Darwin (Larrakeyah to Stokes Hill), NT
16
(12:01) Darwin (town area), NT
26
(20:50) Darwin, NT

==== July ====
7
Horn Island, Qld
25
(20:50) Darwin (town area), NT
26
Townsville, Qld
(21:39–22:54) Darwin (Vesteys Meatworks), NT
27
(22:27) Knuckey's Lagoon, Darwin RAAF Airfield, NT
28
(00:45) Darwin RAAF airfield, NT
Townsville, Qld
29
(00:59) Darwin (town area) and Knuckey's Lagoon, NT.
Townsville, Qld
30
(03:58) Darwin (town area) and Darwin RAAF Airfield, NT
Horn Island, Qld
Port Hedland, WA.
31
Mossman, Qld
(13:33) Darwin RAAF Airfield, NT

==== August ====
1
Horn Island, Qld
21
Wyndham, WA
23
(12:12) Hughes Airfield, NT
24
(21:24) Darwin RAAF Airfield, NT
(22:14) Noonamah, NT
25
(00:05) Darwin and Parap, NT
27
(03:45–05:37) Darwin (Botanical Gardens) and Cox Peninsula, NT
28
(03:35) Darwin (Railway Yards and Port Patterson), NT
30
(02:39) Darwin (town area), NT
31
(05:14) Darwin (town area) and Cox Peninsula), NT

==== September ====
25
(03:41) Darwin (town area) and Knuckey's Lagoon, NT
25
(05:48) Darwin (town area and Daly Street Bridge), NT
26
(05:22) Livingstone Airfield, NT
27
(04:56) Bynoe Harbour, NT
(05:44) Darwin (town area) (Frances Bay)

==== October ====
10
Horn Island, Qld
24
(04:42) Batchelor Airfield
(04:52) Pell Airfield
(04:57) Cox Peninsula
(05:12) Darwin RAAF Airfield, NT
25
(05:30) Darwin (town area) and Darwin RAAF Airfield, NT
26
(04:54) Darwin (town area) and Darwin RAAF Airfield, NT
27
(02:20) Darwin (town area) and Darwin RAAF Airfield, NT

==== November ====
23
(03:00–04:39) Darwin (town area) and Darwin RAAF Airfield, NT
Coomalie Creek Airfield, NT
26
(03:20) Darwin (town area), Strauss Airfield and Hughes Airfield, NT
27
(03:56–04:46) Coomalie Creek, Hughes Airfield and Strauss Airfield, NT

=== 1943 ===
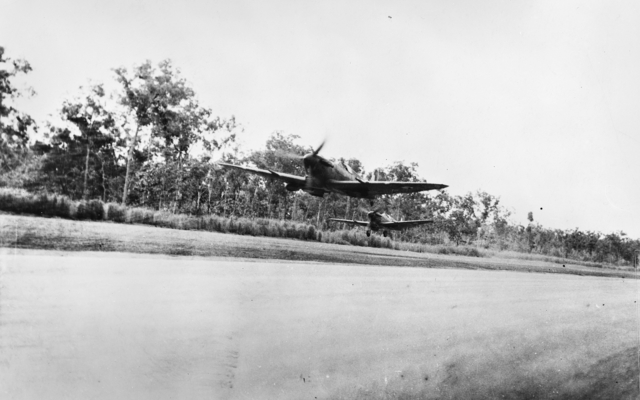
Two Australian Supermarine Spitfire fighters taking off from Darwin to intercept Japanese raiders in March 1943

==== January ====
20
(22:44–00:15) Searchlight station, AWC Camp, Ironstone, NT
21
(21:54) Darwin (Frances Bay), NT
22
(13:30) HMAS Patricia Cam sunk, near Wessel Islands, NT.

==== March ====
2
(14:34) Coomalie Creek Airfield, NT
15
(11:20) Darwin (oil tanks), NT
15
Darwin, NT. Sgt. Albert Cooper, 28, (RAF, 54 Squadron) from Wolverhampton, Staffordshire, England, shot down, and killed, in his Spitfire over Darwin harbour

==== May ====
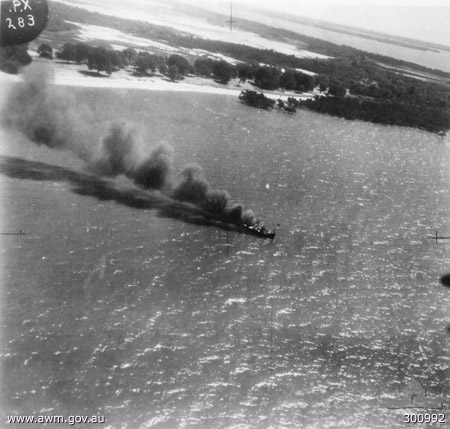
HMAS Maroubra sinking after being attacked off Millingimbi on 10 May 1943

2
(10:15) Darwin RAAF Airfield and Darwin Floating Dock, NT
9
Millingimbi, NT
10
Millingimbi, NT. The cutter HMAS Maroubra was sunk.
20
Exmouth Gulf, WA
21
Exmouth Gulf, WA
28
Millingimbi, NT

==== June ====
18
Horn Island, Qld
20
(10:43) Winnellie and Darwin RAAF Airfield, NT
28
(11:07) Vesteys, NT
30
(12:30) Fenton Airfield, NT

==== July ====
6
(12:02) Fenton Airfield, NT

==== August ====
13
(21:45) Fenton Airfield, NT
(23:12) Fenton Airfield and Coomalie Creek Airfield, NT
(23:42) Coomalie Creek Airfield, NT
14
Long Airfield, NT
17
Port Hedland, WA
21
(00:37) Fenton Airfield and Coomalie Creek Airfield, NT
(03:30) Pell Airfield, NT

==== September ====
15
(00:25) Fenton Airfield and Long Airfield, NT
15
Onslow, WA.
16
Exmouth Gulf, WA (The southernmost air raid in Australia.)
18
(03:50) Fenton Airfield and Long Airfield, NT
27
Drysdale River Mission (Kalumburu) airfield, WA. Six fatalities; Father Thomas Gil, the superior of the mission, and five Aboriginal Australians.

==== November ====
10
Coomalie Creek Airfield, NT
12
(03:53–05:30) Parap, Adelaide River and Batchelor Airfield, NT

== See also ==
- 3rd Air Group
- Takao Air Group
- No. 1 Wing RAAF
- Military history of Australia during World War II
- Battle for Australia
