= List of air groups of the Imperial Japanese Navy =

This article contains a list of air groups of Imperial Japanese Navy Air Service. Literal translation of 海軍航空隊 (Kaigun Kōkūtai) is "Naval Air Group", however, "Naval" is typically omitted in most of the established English-language sources (e.g.,). The list below follows the same convention.

== Place name ==
| Name | Kanji | Formed | Dissolved | Tail code (Note: Wrote what it can be confirmed by official documents or photos. If it is Kanji or Katakana, add italics for read. If it had been used for all periods, do not write down the years and month.) | Note, fate |
|---|---|---|---|---|---|
| Amakusa Air Group | 天草海軍航空隊 | 1 April 1945 | postwar | アマ (Ama) | |
| Atsugi Air Group | 厚木海軍航空隊 | 1 April 1943 | 20 February 1944 | アツ (Atsu, April 1943); R3 (July 1943) | Renamed 203rd Air Group on 20 February 1944. |
| Chichijima Air Group | 父島海軍航空隊 | 1 April 1939 | 15 December 1944 | チチ (Chichi, April 1939); VIIB (October 1941); V (1942) | Incorporated to the 903rd Air Group on 15 December 1944. |
| Chinkai Air Group | 鎭海海軍航空隊 | 1 October 1936 | 15 December 1944 | チ (Chi) | Incorporated to the 951st Air Group on 15 December 1944. |
| Chitose Air Group | 千歳海軍航空隊 | 1 October 1939 | 1 November 1942 | チト (Chito, October 1939); S (November 1940) | Renamed 703rd Air Group on 1 November 1942. |
| Fujisawa Air Group | 藤澤海軍航空隊 | 1 June 1944 | postwar | フヂ (Fudi) | |
| Fukuoka Air Group | 福岡海軍航空隊 | 1 June 1944 | 10 July 1945 | フク (Fuku) | |
| Fukuyama Air Group | 福山海軍航空隊 | 1 March 1945 | postwar | フヤ (Fuya) | |
| Genzan Air Group | 元山海軍航空隊 | 15 November 1940 | 1 November 1942 | ゲン (Gen, used in Japan homeland); G (outside Japan homeland) | Renamed 755th Air Group on 1 November 1942. |
| Genzan Air Group (II) (Note: Imperial Japanese Navy has been revived the old name for some Naval Air Groups. And, there is no relation between the predecessor and the second generation. This article add (II) for them.) | 元山海軍航空隊 | 15 August 1944 | postwar | ケ (Ke, August 1944) ゲン (Gen, 1945) | |
| Hakata Air Group | 博多海軍航空隊 | 15 November 1940 | postwar | ハタ (Hata) | |
| Himeji Air Group | 姫路海軍航空隊 | 1 October 1943 | 5 May 1945 | ヒメ (Hime) | |
| Hitoyoshi Air Group | 人吉海軍航空隊 | 1 February 1944 | 10 July 1945 | ヒト (Hito) | |
| Hyakrihara Air Group | 百里原海軍航空隊 | 1 December 1939 | postwar | リ (Ri) | |
| Isahaya Air Group | 諫早海軍航空隊 | 15 March 1944 | postwar | イサ (Isa) | |
| Iwakuni Air Group | 岩國海軍航空隊 | 1 December 1939 | 15 August 1944 | イハ (Iha) | |
| Iwakuni Air Group (II) | 岩國海軍航空隊 | 1 March 1945 | postwar | イハ (Iha) | |
| Izumi Air Group | 出水海軍航空隊 | 15 April 1943 | 11 February 1945 | イツ (Itsu) | Renamed 1st Izumi Air Group on 11 February 1945. |
| 1st Izumi Air Group | 第一出水海軍航空隊 | 11 February 1945 | 1 March 1945 | イツ (Itsu); 1イツ (1Itsu, March 1945) | Headquarters and airmen were moved to the Kōshū Air Group. |
| 2nd Izumi Air Group | 第二出水海軍航空隊 | 11 February 1945 | 20 July 1945 | 2イツ (2Itsu) | |
| Jinmachi Air Group | 神町海軍航空隊 | 15 December 1944 | postwar | ジン (Jin) | |
| Kagoshima Air Group | 鹿児島海軍航空隊 | 1 April 1943 | 20 July 1945 | カコ (Kako) | |
| Kaikō Air Group | 海口海軍航空隊 | 1 October 1943 | 1 May 1944 | カイ (Kai) | |
| Kanoya Air Group | 鹿屋海軍航空隊 | 1 April 1936 | 1 October 1942 | カヤ (Kaya, April 1936); Y (1938); K (November 1940) | Renamed 751st Air Group on 1 October 1942. |
| Kanoya Air Group (II) | 鹿屋海軍航空隊 | 1 October 1942 | 10 July 1944 | カヤ (Kaya) | Renamed Toyohashi Air Group on 10 July 1944. |
| 2nd Kanoya Air Group | 第二鹿屋海軍航空隊 | 1 February 1944 | 30 June 1945 | 2カヤ (2Kaya) | |
| Kan'onji Air Group | 観音寺海軍航空隊 | 1 March 1944 | postwar | カン (Kan) | |
| Kashima Air Group | 鹿島海軍航空隊 | 15 December 1938 | postwar | カシ (Kashi) | |
| Kasumigaura Air Group | 霞ヶ浦海軍航空隊 | 1 November 1922 | postwar | R (1922) カ (Ka, July 1926) | |
| Katori Air Group | 香取海軍航空隊 | 1 February 1944 | 30 June 1945 | カト (Kato) | |
| Kisarazu Air Group | 木更津海軍航空隊 | 1 April 1936 | 1 November 1942 | キ (Ki, April 1936); X (1938); R (May 1942) | Renamed 707th Air Group on 1 November 1942. |
| Kitaura Air Group | 北浦海軍航空隊 | 1 April 1942 | 5 May 1945 | キタ (Kita) | |
| Kobi Air Group | 虎尾海軍航空隊 | 15 May 1944 | 15 February 1945 | コビ (Kobi) | |
| Kōchi Air Group | 髙知海軍航空隊 | 15 March 1944 | postwar | カチ (Kachi) | |
| Kofuji Air Group | 小富士海軍航空隊 | 1 October 1944 | postwar | | |
| Kokubu Air Group | 國分海軍航空隊 | 1 August 1944 | 1 March 1945 | コク (Koku) | Renamed Kan'onji Air Group on 1 March 1945. |
| Komatsu Air Group | 小松海軍航空隊 | 1 September 1944 | 30 June 1945 | コマツ (Komatsu) | |
| Komatsushima Air Group | 小松島海軍航空隊 | 1 October 1941 | 15 December 1944 | コマ (Koma) | Incorporated to the 903rd Air Group on 15 December 1944. |
| Kōnoike Air Group | 神ノ池海軍航空隊 | 15 February 1944 | 15 December 1944 | コウ (Kou) | |
| Kōriyama Air Group | 郡山海軍航空隊 | 1 February 1944 | 11 February 1945 | コリ (Kori) | Renamed 1st Kōriyama Air Group on 15 March 1945. |
| 1st Kōriyama Air Group | 第一郡山海軍航空隊 | 11 February 1945 | postwar | コリ (Kori); 1コリ (1Kori, March 1945) | |
| 2nd Kōriyama Air Group | 第二郡山海軍航空隊 | 15 March 1944 | postwar | 2コリ (2Kori) | |
| Kōshū Air Group | 光州海軍航空隊 | 1 March 1945 | postwar | コウ (Kou) | |
| Kōyasan Air Group | 髙野山海軍航空隊 | 1 March 1945 | postwar | コヤ (Koya) | |
| Kōwa Air Group | 河和海軍航空隊 | 1 December 1943 | 11 February 1945 | カウ (Kau) | Renamed 1st Kōwa Air Group on 1 March 1945. |
| 1st Kōwa Air Group | 第一河和海軍航空隊 | 11 February 1945 | postwar | カウ (Kau); 1カウ (1Kau, March 1945) | |
| 2nd Kōwa Air Group | 第二河和海軍航空隊 | 1 April 1944 | postwar | 2カウ (2Kau) | |
| Kurashiki Air Group | 倉敷海軍航空隊 | 1 November 1944 | postwar | クラ (Kura) | |
| Kure Air Group | 吳海軍航空隊 | 1 June 1931 | 5 May 1945 | ク (Ku) | |
| Kushimoto Air Group | 串本海軍航空隊 | 1 December 1942 | 15 December 1944 | クシ (Kushi) | Incorporated to the 903rd Air Group on 15 December 1944. |
| Kushira Air Group | 串良海軍航空隊 | 1 April 1944 | 10 July 1945 | クシラ (Kushira) | |
| Maizuru Air Group | 舞鶴海軍航空隊 | 1 October 1935 | 15 December 1944 | マ (Ma) | Incorporated to the 903rd Air Group on 15 December 1944. |
| Matsushima Air Group | 松島海軍航空隊 | 1 August 1944 | postwar | マシ (Mashi) | |
| Matsuyama Air Group | 松山海軍航空隊 | 1 October 1943 | 15 July 1945 | マツ (Matsu) | |
| Mie Air Group | 三重海軍航空隊 | 1 August 1942 | postwar | ミエ (Mie) | |
| Miho Air Group | 美保海軍航空隊 | 1 October 1943 | 30 June 1945 | ミホ (Miho) | |
| 2nd Miho Air Group | 第二美保海軍航空隊 | 15 January 1944 | 11 February 1945 | 2ミホ (2Miho) | Headquarters and airmen were moved to the Yamato Air Group. |
| Mihoro Air Group | 美幌海軍航空隊 | 1 October 1940 | 1 November 1942 | ミ (Mi, October 1940); M (November 1940) | Renamed 701st Air Group on 1 November 1942. |
| Mineyama Air Group | 峯山海軍航空隊 | 1 March 1945 | postwar | ミネ (Mine) | |
| Misawa Air Group | 三澤海軍航空隊 | 10 February 1942 | 1 November 1942 | ミサ (Misa, in Japan homelanmd); H (outside Japan homeland) | Renamed 705th Air Group on 1 November 1942. |
| Misawa Air Group (II) | 三澤海軍航空隊 | 1 September 1944 | 30 June 1945 | ミサ (Misa) | |
| Miyazaki Air Group | 宮崎海軍航空隊 | 1 December 1943 | 1 August 1944 | ミヤ (Miya) | |
| Nagoya Air Group | 名古屋海軍航空隊 | 1 April 1942 | postwar | ナコ (Nako) | |
| Nara Air Group | 奈良海軍航空隊 | 1 March 1945 | postwar | ナラ (Nara) | |
| Nishinomiya Air Group | 西ノ宮海軍航空隊 | 1 March 1945 | 30 June 1945 | ニシ (Nishi) | |
| Ōi Air Group | 大井海軍航空隊 | 1 April 1942 | postwar | オヰ (Oi) | |
| Oihama Air Group | 追濱海軍航空隊 | 1 November 1942 | 20 December 1944 | オヒ (Ohi) | |
| Ōita Air Group | 大分海軍航空隊 | 15 December 1938 | 15 March 1944 | オタ (Ota) | |
| Okazaki Air Group | 岡崎海軍航空隊 | 1 April 1944 | 11 February 1945 | オカ (Oka) | Renamed 1st Okazaki Air Group. |
| 1st Okazaki Air Group | 第一岡崎海軍航空隊 | 11 February 1945 | postwar | オカ (Oka); 1オカ (1Oka, March 1945) | |
| 2nd Okazaki Air Group | 第二岡崎海軍航空隊 | 15 August 1944 | postwar | オカ (Oka); 2オカ (2Oka, March 1945) | |
| 3rd Okazaki Air Group | 第三岡崎海軍航空隊 | 11 February 1945 | postwar | 3オカ (3Oka, March 1945) | |
| Okinawa Air Group | 沖繩海軍航空隊 | 15 April 1944 | 15 December 1944 | オキ (Oki) | Incorporated to the 951st Air Group on 15 December 1944. |
| Ōminato Air Group | 大湊海軍航空隊 | 1 November 1933 | 15 December 1944 | オミ (Omi) | Incorporated to the 903rd Air Group on 15 December 1944. |
| Ōmura Air Group | 大村海軍航空隊 | 1 December 1922 | 5 May 1945 | O (December 1922) オ (O, July 1926) | |
| Ōryū Air Group | 黄流海軍航空隊 | 1 April 1943 | 1 May 1944 | オウ (Ou) | |
| Ōtsu Air Group | 大津海軍航空隊 | 1 April 1942 | postwar | オツ (Otsu) | |
| Pusan Air Group | 釜山海軍航空隊 | 11 February 1945 | postwar | フサ (Fusa) | |
| Saeki Air Group | 佐伯海軍航空隊 | 15 February 1934 | postwar | サヘ (Sahe) | |
| Sagamino Air Group | 相模野海軍航空隊 | 1 November 1942 | 11 February 1945 | サカ (Saka) | Renamed 1st Sagamino Air Group on 11 February 1945. |
| 1st Sagamino Air Group | 第一相模野海軍航空隊 | 11 February 1945 | postwar | サカ (Saka); 1サカ (1Saka, March 1945) | |
| 2nd Sagamino Air Group | 第二相模野海軍航空隊 | 1 October 1943 | postwar | 2サカ (2Saka) | |
| Saijō Air Group | 西條海軍航空隊 | 1 March 1945 | postwar | サイ (Sai) | |
| San'a Air Group | 三亞海軍航空隊 | 1 October 1943 | 1 June 1944 | サン (San) | |
| Sasebo Air Group | 佐世保海軍航空隊 | 1 December 1920 | 15 December 1944 | S (1922) サ (Sa, July 1926) | Renamed 951st Air Group on 15 December 1944. |
| Seitō Air Group | 靑島海軍航空隊 | 15 January 1944 | postwar | セイ (Sei) | |
| Seto Air Group | 瀨戸海軍航空隊 | 1 November 1944 | 15 July 1945 | | |
| Shanhai Air Group | 上海海軍航空隊 | 15 January 1944 | 1 February 1945 | シヤ (Shiya) | |
| Shiga Air Group | 滋賀海軍航空隊 | 15 August 1944 | postwar | シガ (Shiga) | |
| Shimizu Air Group | 清水海軍航空隊 | 1 September 1944 | 30 June 1945 | シミ (Shimi) | |
| Shinchiku Air Group | 新竹海軍航空隊 | 1 April 1942 | 1 January 1944 | シン (Shin) | |
| Sukumo Air Group | 宿毛海軍航空隊 | 1 April 1943 | 1 January 1944 | スク (Suku) | Renamed 453rd Air Group on 1 January 1944. |
| Sunosaki Air Group | 洲ノ埼海軍航空隊 | 1 June 1943 | postwar | スサ (Susa) | |
| Suzuka Air Group | 鈴鹿海軍航空隊 | 1 October 1938 | postwar | ス (Su) | |
| Takao Air Group | 髙雄海軍航空隊 | 1 April 1938 | 1 October 1942 | タカ (Taka, April 1938); T (November 1940) | Renamed 753rd Air Group on 1 October 1942. |
| Takao Air Group (II) | 髙雄海軍航空隊 | 1 October 1942 | 1 December 1944 | タカ (Taka) | |
| 2nd Takao Air Group | 第二髙雄海軍航空隊 | 15 August 1944 | 15 February 1945 | 2タカ (2Taka) | |
| Takarazuka Air Group | 寳塚海軍航空隊 | 1 March 1945 | 30 June 1945 | タカ (Taka) | |
| Takuma Air Group | 詫間海軍航空隊 | 1 June 1943 | postwar | タク (Taku, June 1943); T (April 1945) | |
| Tainan Air Group | 臺南海軍航空隊 | 1 October 1941 | 1 November 1942 | タイ (Tai, used in Japan homeland); V (outside Japan homeland) | Renamed 251st Air Group on 1 November 1942. |
| Tainan Air Group (II) | 臺南海軍航空隊 | 1 April 1943 | 15 December 1944 | タイ (Tai) | |
| 2nd Tainan Air Group | 第二臺南海軍航空隊 | 1 February 1944 | 15 February 1945 | 2タイ (2Tai) | |
| Tarumi Air Group | 垂水海軍航空隊 | 1 February 1944 | postwar | タル (Taru) | |
| Tateyama Air Group | 館山海軍航空隊 | 1 June 1930 | 15 December 1944 | タ (Ta) | Incorporated to the 903rd Air Group on 15 December 1944. |
| Tateyama Air Group (II) | 館山海軍航空隊 | 15 May 1945 | postwar | タ (Ta) | |
| Taura Air Group | 田浦海軍航空隊 | 1 March 1945 | postwar | タウラ (Taura) | |
| Tokushima Air Group | 徳島海軍航空隊 | 1 April 1942 | postwar | トク (Toku) | |
| Tōkō Air Group | 東港海軍航空隊 | 15 November 1940 | 1 November 1942 | トコ (Toko, used in Japan homeland); O (outside Japan homeland) | Renamed 851st Air Group on 1 November 1942. |
| Tōkyō Air Group | 東京海軍航空隊 | 1 March 1945 | postwar | ト (To) | |
| Toyohashi Air Group | 豊橋海軍航空隊 | 1 April 1943 | 20 February 1944 | トヨ (Toyo, April 1943); R2 (July 1943) | Renamed 701st Air Group on 20 February 1944. |
| Toyohashi Air Group (II) | 豊橋海軍航空隊 | 10 July 1944 | postwar | トヨ (Toyo) | |
| Tsuiki Air Group | 築城海軍航空隊 | 1 October 1942 | 20 February 1944 | ツイ (Tsui) | Renamed 553rd Air Group on 20 February 1944. |
| Tsuiki Air Group (II) | 築城海軍航空隊 | 15 March 1944 | postwar | ツイ (Tsui) | |
| Tsuchiura Air Group | 土浦海軍航空隊 | 15 November 1940 | postwar | ツチ (Tsuchi) | |
| Tsukuba Air Group | 筑波海軍航空隊 | 15 December 1938 | postwar | ツ (Tsu) | |
| Urado Air Group | 浦戸海軍航空隊 | 1 November 1944 | 15 July 1945 | ウラ (Ura) | |
| Usa Air Group | 宇佐海軍航空隊 | 1 October 1939 | 5 May 1945 | ウサ (Usa) | |
| Uwajima Air Group | 宇和島海軍航空隊 | 1 March 1945 | 15 July 1945 | ウワ (Uwa) | |
| Yamato Air Group | 大和海軍航空隊 | 11 February 1945 | postwar | ヤマ (Yama) | |
| Yatabe Air Group | 谷田部海軍航空隊 | 1 December 1939 | postwar | ヤ (Ya) | |
| Yokohama Air Group | 横濱海軍航空隊 | 1 October 1936 | 1 November 1942 | ヨハ (Yoha, October 1936); Y (November 1940) | Renamed 801st Air Group on 1 November 1942. |
| Yokosuka Air Group | 横須賀海軍航空隊 | 1 April 1916 | postwar | Y (1922) ヨ (Yo, July 1926) | |

== Numbered name ==
| Name | Kanji | Formed | Dissolved | Tail code | Note, fate |
|---|---|---|---|---|---|
| 1st Air Group (Note: One digit numbered name and two-digits numbered name does not have 海軍 (Kaigun, Naval) in their names.) | 第一航空隊 | 10 April 1941 | 1 November 1942 | Z | Renamed 752nd Air Group on 1 November 1942. |
| 2nd Air Group | 第二航空隊 | 31 May 1942 | 1 November 1942 | Q | Renamed 582nd Air Group on 1 November 1942. |
| 3rd Air Group | 第三航空隊 | 1 April 1941 | 1 November 1942 | X | Renamed 202nd Air Group on 1 November 1942. |
| 4th Air Group | 第四航空隊 | 10 February 1942 | 1 November 1942 | F | Renamed 702nd Air Group on 1 November 1942. |
| 5th Air Group | 第五航空隊 | 5 August 1942 | 1 November 1942 | R | Renamed 452nd Air Group on 1 November 1942. |
| 6th Air Group | 第六航空隊 | 1 April 1942 | 1 November 1942 | U | Renamed 204th Air Group on 1 November 1942. |
| 7th Air Group | 第七航空隊 | 15 November 1940 | 10 April 1941 | I-VII | Renamed 16th Air Group on 10 April 1941. |
| 8th Air Group | 第八航空隊 | 15 November 1940 | 10 April 1941 | I-VIII | Renamed 18th Air Group on 10 April 1941. |
| 11th Air Group | 第十一航空隊 | 24 September 1936 | 16 November 1936 | | |
| 12th Air Group | 第十二航空隊 | 11 July 1937 | 15 September 1941 | S (July 1937); 3 (autumn 1937) | |
| 13th Air Group | 第十三航空隊 | 11 July 1937 | 15 November 1940 | T (July 1937); 4 (autumn 1937) | |
| 14th Air Group | 第十四航空隊 | 1 April 1938 | 15 September 1941 | 9 | |
| 14th Air Group (II) | 第十四航空隊 | 1 April 1942 | 1 November 1942 | W | Renamed 802nd Air Group on 1 November 1942. |
| 15th Air Group | 第十五航空隊 | 25 June 1938 | 1 December 1938 | K (June 1938); 10 (Late 1938) | |
| 15th Air Group (II) | 第十五航空隊 | 15 November 1939 | 15 November 1940 | | |
| 16th Air Group | 第十六航空隊 | 15 December 1938 | 15 November 1939 | | Aircraft and airmen were moved to seaplane tender Kamikawa Maru on 15 November 1939. |
| 16th Air Group (II) | 第十六航空隊 | 10 April 1941 | 1 February 1942 | 16 | Renamed 3rd Base Force Attached Float Reconnaissance Unit on 1 February 1942. |
| 17th Air Group | 第十七航空隊 | 1 October 1941 | 1 April 1942 | 17 | Renamed 4th Base Force Attached Float Reconnaissance Unit on 1 April 1942. |
| 18th Air Group | 第十八航空隊 | 10 April 1941 | 1 December 1942 | 18 | Incorporated to the 902nd Air Group on 1 December 1942. |
| 19th Air Group | 第十九航空隊 | 15 January 1941 | 1 November 1942 | 19 | Renamed 952nd Air Group on 1 November 1942. |
| 21st Air Group | 第二十一航空隊 | 11 July 1937 | 20 October 1937 | | Aircraft and airmen were moved to seaplane tender Kinugasa Maru on 20 October 1937. |
| 21st Air Group (II) | 第二十一航空隊 | 10 June 1942 | 1 November 1942 | 21 | Renamed 902nd Air Group on 1 November 1942. |
| 22nd Air Group | 第二十二航空隊 | 11 July 1937 | 9 October 1937 | | Aircraft and airmen were moved to seaplane tender Kinugasa Maru on 9 October 1937. |
| 23rd Air Group | 第二十三航空隊 | 13 August 1937 | 2 October 1937 | | Aircraft and airmen were moved to seaplane tender Notoro on 2 October 1937. |
| 31st Air Group | 第三十一航空隊 | 1 February 1942 | 1 November 1942 | 31 | Renamed 954th Air Group on 1 November 1942. |
| 32nd Air Group | 第三十二航空隊 | 1 February 1942 | 10 June 1942 | 32 | Aircraft and airmen were moved to the 21st Air Group on 1 June 1942. |
| 33rd Air Group | 第三十三航空隊 | 1 February 1942 | 1 November 1942 | 33 | Renamed 932nd Air Group on 1 November 1942. |
| 35th Air Group | 第三十五航空隊 | 1 February 1942 | 1 November 1942 | 35 | Renamed 956th Air Group on 1 November 1942. |
| 36th Air Group | 第三十六航空隊 | 20 June 1942 | 1 November 1942 | 36 | Renamed 934th Air Group on 1 November 1942. |
| 40th Air Group | 第四十航空隊 | 1 February 1942 | 1 November 1942 | 40 | Renamed 936th Air Group on 1 November 1942. |
| 11th Air Group | 第一一海軍航空隊 | 1 May 1944 | 5 April 1945 | 11 | Aircraft were moved to the 31st Air Group, airmen were moved to the 381st Air Group. |
| 12th Air Group | 第一二海軍航空隊 | 1 May 1944 | 15 May 1945 | 12 | Re-organized to the Inshi Air Group on 15 May 1945. |
| 13th Air Group | 第一三海軍航空隊 | 1 May 1944 | 15 May 1945 | 13 | Aircraft and airmen were moved to the 381st Air Group and 936th Air Group. |
| 31st Air Group | 第三一海軍航空隊 | 1 March 1944 | postwar | 31 | |
| 32nd Air Group | 第三二海軍航空隊 | 1 March 1944 | 10 July 1944 | 32 | Aircraft and airmen were moved to the 31st Air Group on 10 July 1944. |
| 121st Air Group | 第一二一海軍航空隊 | 1 October 1943 | 10 July 1944 | 雉 (Kiji, October 1943); 21 or 121 (February 1944) | Also known as the Green Pheasant Corps (雉部隊, Kiji Butai). |
| 131st Air Group | 第一三一海軍航空隊 | 10 July 1944 | postwar | 31 or 131 | Also known as the Mount Fuji Corps (芙蓉部隊, Fuyō Butai)(Fuyō is one of the elegant name of Mt.Fuji). |
| 132nd Air Group | 第一三二海軍航空隊 | 5 February 1945 | postwar | 132 | |
| 133rd Air Group | 第一三三海軍航空隊 | 5 February 1945 | 5 June 1945 | 133 | |
| 141st Air Group | 第一四一海軍航空隊 | 15 March 1944 | postwar | 曉 (Akatsuki, used in Japan homeland); 41 or 141 (outside Japan homeland) | Also known as the Dawn Corps (曉部隊, Akatsuki Butai). |
| 151st Air Group | 第一五一海軍航空隊 | 15 April 1943 | 10 July 1944 | W4 (April 1943); 51 or 151 (1944) | |
| 153rd Air Group | 第一五三海軍航空隊 | 1 January 1944 | postwar | 53 or 153 | |
| 171st Air Group | 第一七一海軍航空隊 | 1 May 1945 | postwar | 171 | |
| 201st Air Group | 第二〇一海軍航空隊 | 1 December 1942 | postwar | W1 (December 1942); 01 or 201 (1944) | |
| 202nd Air Group | 第二〇二海軍航空隊 | 1 November 1942 | 10 July 1944 | X (November 1942); X2 (1943); 02 or 202 (March 1944) | |
| 203rd Air Group | 第二〇三海軍航空隊 | 20 February 1944 | postwar | 3 or 03 | |
| 204th Air Group | 第二〇四海軍航空隊 | 1 November 1942 | 4 March 1944 | U (November 1942); T2 (1943); 204 (1944) | |
| 204th Air Group (II) | 第二〇四海軍航空隊 | 5 February 1945 | postwar | 204 | |
| 205th Air Group | 第二〇五海軍航空隊 | 5 February 1945 | postwar | 205 | |
| 210th Air Group | 第二一〇海軍航空隊 | 15 September 1944 | postwar | 210 (1944); 210 with squadron code (1945) | |
| 221st Air Group | 第二二一海軍航空隊 | 15 January 1944 | postwar | 嵐 (Arashi, used in Japan homeland); 21 (July 1944 ?); 221 with squadron code (August 1944) | Also known as the Storm Corps (嵐部隊, Arashi Butai). |
| 251st Air Group | 第二五一海軍航空隊 | 1 November 1942 | 10 July 1944 | U1 (November 1942); 51 (1944) | |
| 252nd Air Group | 第二五二海軍航空隊 | 20 September 1942 | postwar | Y2 (September 1942); 52 or 252 (1944) | |
| 253rd Air Group | 第二五三海軍航空隊 | 1 November 1942 | 10 July 1944 | U3 (November 1942); Z1 (1943); 53 or 253 (1944) | |
| 254th Air Group | 第二五四海軍航空隊 | 1 October 1943 | 1 January 1945 | 54 (October 1943); 254 (July 1944) | Incorporated to the 901st Air Group on 1 January 1945. |
| 256th Air Group | 第二五六海軍航空隊 | 1 February 1944 | 15 December 1944 | 56 (February 1944); 256 (July 1944) | Incorporated to the 951st Air Group on 15 December 1944. |
| 261st Air Group | 第二六一海軍航空隊 | 1 October 1943 | 10 July 1944 | 虎 (Tora, October 1943); 61 (February 1944) | Also known as the Tiger Corps (虎部隊, Tora Butai). |
| 263rd Air Group | 第二六三海軍航空隊 | 1 October 1943 | 10 July 1944 | 豹 (Hyō, December 1943); 63 (1944) | Also known as the Leopard Corps (豹部隊, Hyō Butai). |
| 265th Air Group | 第二六五海軍航空隊 | 18 November 1943 | 10 July 1944 | 雷 (Ikazuchi, November 1943); 65 (1944) | Also known as the Lightning Corps (雷部隊, Ikazuchi Butai). |
| 281st Air Group | 第二八一海軍航空隊 | 1 March 1943 | 20 February 1944 | V1 (March 1943); 81 (1944) | Honorable death until 6 February 1944 during the Battle of Kwajalein in Ruot. |
| 301st Air Group | 第三〇一海軍航空隊 | 5 November 1943 | 10 July 1944 | ヨC (YoC, November 1943); 01 (1944) | |
| 302nd Air Group | 第三〇二海軍航空隊 | 1 March 1944 | postwar | ヨD (YoD) | Home-defense air group based at Atsugi. |
| 312th Air Group | 第三一二海軍航空隊 | 5 February 1945 | postwar | 312 | |
| 321st Air Group | 第三二一海軍航空隊 | 1 October 1943 | 10 July 1944 | 鵄 (Tobi, October 1943); 21 (1944) | Also known as the Black Kite Corps (鵄部隊, Tobi Butai). |
| 322nd Air Group | 第三二二海軍航空隊 | 15 March 1944 | 10 July 1944 | 電 (Inazuma, used in Japan homeland); 22 (outside Japan homeland) | Also known as the Thunder Corps (電部隊, Inazuma Butai). |
| 331st Air Group | 第三三一海軍航空隊 | 1 July 1943 | 15 May 1945 | 31 (July 1943); 331 (July 1944) | |
| 332nd Air Group | 第三三二海軍航空隊 | 1 August 1945 | postwar | 32 | |
| 341st Air Group | 第三四一海軍航空隊 | 15 November 1943 | postwar | 獅 (Shishi, November 1943); 341 with squadron code (1944) | Also known as the Lion Corps (獅部隊, Shishi Butai). |
| 343rd Air Group | 第三四三海軍航空隊 | 1 January 1944 | 10 July 1944 | 隼 (Hayabusa, used in Japan homeland); 43 (outside Japan homeland) | Also known as the Falcon Corps (隼部隊, Hayabusa Butai). |
| 343rd Air Group (II) | 第三四三海軍航空隊 | 25 December 1944 | postwar | 343 with squadron code | Also known as the Sword Corps (剣部隊, Tsurugi Butai). |
| 345th Air Group | 第三四五海軍航空隊 | 1 February 1944 | 10 July 1944 | 光 (Hikari, in Japanhomeland); 45 (outside Japan homeland) | Also known as the Sunlight Corps (光部隊, Hikari Butai). |
| 352nd Air Group | 第三五二海軍航空隊 | 1 August 1944 | postwar | 352 | Also known as the Kusanagi Corps (草薙部隊, Kusanagi Butai). |
| 361st Air Group | 第三六一海軍航空隊 | 15 March 1944 | 10 July 1944 | 晃 (Akira, used in Japan homeland); 361 (outside Japan homeland) | Also known as the Shining Light Corps (晃部隊, Akira Butai). |
| 381st Air Group | 第三八一海軍航空隊 | 1 October 1943 | postwar | 81 or squadron code | |
| 452nd Air Group | 第四五二海軍航空隊 | 1 November 1942 | 1 January 1945 | R (November 1942); M1 (1943); VII (July 1943); 52 or 452 (Late 1943) | |
| 453rd Air Group | 第四五三海軍航空隊 | 1 January 1944 | 15 December 1944 | サA (SaA, January 1944); KEC (February 1944) | Incorporated to the 951st Air Group on 15 December 1944. |
| 501st Air Group | 第五〇一海軍航空隊 | 1 July 1943 | 10 July 1944 | 01 | |
| 502nd Air Group | 第五〇二海軍航空隊 | 15 September 1943 | 1 October 1944 | 02 | |
| 503rd Air Group | 第五〇三海軍航空隊 | 1 October 1943 | 10 July 1944 | ヨB (YoB, October 1943); 03 (February 1944) squadron code (March 1944) | |
| 521st Air Group | 第五二一海軍航空隊 | 20 August 1943 | 10 July 1944 | 鵬 (Ōtori, August 1943); 21 (1944) | Also known as the Phoenix Corps (鵬部隊, Ōtori Butai). |
| 522nd Air Group | 第五二二海軍航空隊 | 1 March 1944 | 10 July 1944 | 轟 (Todoroki, used in Japan homeland); 22 (outside Japan homeland) | Also known as the Roar Corps (轟部隊, Todoroki Butai). |
| 523rd Air Group | 第五二三海軍航空隊 | 5 November 1943 | 10 July 1944 | 鷹 (Taka, November 1943); 23 (1944) | Also known as the Hawk Corps (鷹部隊, Taka Butai). |
| 524th Air Group | 第五二四海軍航空隊 | 15 March 1944 | 10 July 1944 | 曙 (Akebono, used in Japan homeland); 24 (outside Japan homeland) | Also known as the Sunrise Corps (曙部隊, Akebono Butai). |
| 531st Air Group | 第五三一海軍航空隊 | 1 July 1943 | 20 February 1944 | 31 | Honorable death on 5 February 1944 during the Battle of Kwajalein in Ruot. |
| 541st Air Group | 第五四一海軍航空隊 | 15 March 1944 | 10 July 1944 | 響 (Hibiki, used in Japan homeland); 41 (outside Japan homeland) | Also known as the Echo Corps (響部隊, Hibiki Butai). |
| 551st Air Group | 第五五一海軍航空隊 | 1 September 1943 | 10 July 1944 | 51 | |
| 552nd Air Group | 第五五二海軍航空隊 | 1 December 1942 | 4 March 1944 | W3 (December 1942); Y3 (July 1943); 52 (1944) | |
| 553rd Air Group | 第五五三海軍航空隊 | 20 February 1944 | 1 October 1944 | 53 | |
| 582nd Air Group | 第五八二海軍航空隊 | 1 November 1942 | 4 March 1944 | Q (November 1942); T3 (June 1943); 82 (1944) | |
| 601st Air Group | 第六〇一海軍航空隊 | 15 February 1944 | postwar | 31x or 1_{x} (February 1944); 601 (July 1944) | |
| 631st Air Group | 第六三一海軍航空隊 | 15 December 1944 | postwar | K6 | |
| 634th Air Group | 第六三四海軍航空隊 | 1 May 1944 | postwar | 634 or squadron code | |
| 652nd Air Group | 第六五二海軍航空隊 | 15 February 1944 | 10 July 1944 | 32x or 2_{x} | |
| 653rd Air Group | 第六五三海軍航空隊 | 15 February 1944 | 15 November 1944 | 33x or 3_{x} (February 1944); 653 (July 1944) squadron code (temporary) | |
| 701st Air Group | 第七〇一海軍航空隊 | 1 November 1942 | 15 March 1943 | M | |
| 701st Air Group (II) | 第七〇一海軍航空隊 | 20 February 1944 | postwar | R2 (February 1944); 01 or 701 (November 1944) | |
| 702nd Air Group | 第七〇二海軍航空隊 | 1 November 1942 | 11 December 1943 | F (November 1942); U2 (April 1943) | |
| 703rd Air Group | 第七〇三海軍航空隊 | 1 November 1942 | 15 March 1943 | S (November 1942); U3 (June 1943) | |
| 705th Air Group | 第七〇五海軍航空隊 | 1 November 1942 | 1 October 1944 | H (November 1942); T1 (June 1943); 705 (1944) | |
| 706th Air Group | 第七〇六海軍航空隊 | 5 March 1945 | postwar | 706 | |
| 707th Air Group | 第七〇七海軍航空隊 | 1 November 1942 | 1 December 1942 | R | Aircraft and airmen were moved to the 705th Air Group on 1 December 1942. |
| 721st Air Group | 第七二一海軍航空隊 | 1 October 1944 | postwar | ヨF (YoF) or 721 (October 1944); 721 with squadron code (1945) 神 (Jin, fighter squadron only) | Also known as the God Thunder Corps (神雷部隊, Jinrai Butai). |
| 722nd Air Group | 第七二二海軍航空隊 | 15 February 1945 | postwar | 22 or 722 | Also known as the Tornado Corps (竜巻部隊, Tatsumaki Butai). |
| 723rd Air Group | 第七二三海軍航空隊 | 10 June 1945 | postwar | | |
| 724th Air Group | 第七二四海軍航空隊 | 1 July 1945 | postwar | | |
| 725th Air Group | 第七二五海軍航空隊 | 1 July 1945 | postwar | | |
| 732nd Air Group | 第七三二海軍航空隊 | 1 October 1943 | 10 July 1944 | 32 | |
| 751st Air Group | 第七五一海軍航空隊 | 1 October 1942 | 10 July 1944 | K (October 1942); Z2 (1943); 51 or 751 (1944) | |
| 752nd Air Group | 第七五二海軍航空隊 | 1 November 1942 | postwar | Z (November 1942); W2 (May 1943); 52 (1944); 752 (summer 1944) | |
| 753rd Air Group | 第七五三海軍航空隊 | 1 October 1942 | 10 July 1944 | T (October 1942); X1 (July 1943); 53 (1944); 753 (July 1944) | |
| 755th Air Group | 第七五五海軍航空隊 | 1 November 1942 | 10 July 1944 | G (November 1942); Y1 (July 1943); 55 (1944) | |
| 761st Air Group | 第七六一海軍航空隊 | 1 June 1943 | postwar | 龍 (Ryū, June 1943); 761 (1944) | Also known as the Dragon Corps (龍部隊, Ryū Butai). |
| 762nd Air Group | 第七六二海軍航空隊 | 15 February 1944 | postwar | 輝 (Kagayaki, used in Japan homeland); 62 or 762 (outside Japan homeland); 762 with squadron code (Late 1944) | Also known as the Shine Corps (輝部隊, Kagayaki Butai). |
| 763rd Air Group | 第七六三海軍航空隊 | 1 October 1944 | postwar | 763 | |
| 765th Air Group | 第七六五海軍航空隊 | 5 February 1945 | postwar | 765 | |
| 801st Air Group | 第八〇一海軍航空隊 | 1 November 1942 | postwar | Y (November 1942); U3 (May 1943); 801 (1944) | |
| 802nd Air Group | 第八〇二海軍航空隊 | 1 November 1942 | 1 April 1944 | W (November 1942); N1 (March 1943); Y4 (Late 1943); 802 (1944) | Aircraft and airmen were moved to the 801st Air Group on 1 April 1944. |
| 851st Air Group | 第八五一海軍航空隊 | 1 November 1942 | 20 September 1944 | O (November 1942); 51 or 851 (Late 1943) | |
| 901st Air Group | 第九〇一海軍航空隊 | 18 December 1943 | postwar | KEA | |
| 902nd Air Group | 第九〇二海軍航空隊 | 1 November 1942 | 1 August 1944 | 02 (November 1942); 902 (1943 ?) | |
| 903rd Air Group | 第九〇三海軍航空隊 | 15 December 1944 | postwar | ヨG (YoG) or 903 | |
| 931st Air Group | 第九三一海軍航空隊 | 1 February 1944 | postwar | KEB | |
| 932nd Air Group | 第九三二海軍航空隊 | 1 November 1942 | 1 October 1944 | 32 | Re-organized to the Tōin Air Group on 1 October 1944. |
| 933rd Air Group | 第九三三海軍航空隊 | 1 September 1944 | 1 January 1945 | 933 | Incorporated to the 936th Air Group on 1 January 1945. |
| 934th Air Group | 第九三四海軍航空隊 | 1 November 1942 | 1 October 1944 | 934 | |
| 936th Air Group | 第九三六海軍航空隊 | 1 November 1942 | postwar | 936 | |
| 938th Air Group | 第九三八海軍航空隊 | 15 April 1943 | 1 December 1944 | 38 | |
| Sasebo Air Group | 第九五一海軍航空隊 | 15 December 1944 | postwar | サ951 (Sa951) or 951 | |
| 952nd Air Group | 第九五二海軍航空隊 | 1 November 1942 | 1 March 1944 | 952 | |
| 953rd Air Group | 第九五三海軍航空隊 | 1 June 1944 | 1 January 1945 | 953 | Incorporated to the 901st Air Group on 1 January 1945. |
| 954th Air Group | 第九五四海軍航空隊 | 1 November 1942 | 1 January 1945 | 954 | Incorporated to the 901st Air Group on 1 January 1945. |
| 955th Air Group | 第九五五海軍航空隊 | 1 August 1944 | postwar | 955 | |
| 956th Air Group | 第九五六海軍航空隊 | 1 November 1942 | 1 December 1942 | 56 | Incorporated to the 582nd Air Group on 1 December 1942. |
| 958th Air Group | 第九五八海軍航空隊 | 1 December 1942 | postwar | P3 (December 1942); 58 (Late 1943) | |
| 1st Airlift Group; 1001st Air Group | 第一航空輸送隊 第一〇〇一海軍航空隊 | 1 May 1943; 1 July 1943 | postwar | ヨA (YoA, 1943); 01 (1944) | |
| 1021st Air Group | 第一〇二一海軍航空隊 | 1 January 1944 | 15 July 1945 | 鳩 (Hato) or 21 | Also known as the Pigeon Corps (鳩部隊, Hato Butai). Incorporated to the 1081st Air Group on 15 July 1945. |
| 1022nd Air Group | 第一〇二二海軍航空隊 | 10 July 1944 | postwar | 虹 (Niji) or 22 | Also known as the Rainbow Corps (虹部隊, Niji Butai). |
| 1023rd Air Group | 第一〇二三海軍航空隊 | 1 October 1944 | 5 March 1945 | 23 | |
| 1081st Air Group | 第一〇八一海軍航空隊 | 1 April 1944 | postwar | ヨE (YoE) or 81 | |

== Regional name ==
| Name | Kanji | Formed | Dissolved | Tail code | Note, fate |
|---|---|---|---|---|---|
| Chōsen Air Group | 朝鮮海軍航空隊 | 10 June 1945 | postwar | | |
| Chūhi Air Group | 中菲海軍航空隊 | 15 November 1944 | postwar | | |
| Chūshi Air Group | 中支海軍航空隊 | 20 February 1945 | postwar | 中 (Chū) | |
| Gōhoku Air Group | 濠北海軍航空隊 | 10 July 1944 | 5 May 1945 | | |
| Higashikarorin Air Group | 東カロリン海軍航空隊 | 10 July 1944 | postwar | HK | |
| Hitō Air Group | 菲島海軍航空隊 | 10 July 1944 | 15 November 1944 | | Divided the Hokuhi Air Group, Chūhi Air Group and Nanpi Air Group on 15 November 1944. |
| Hokuhi Air Group | 北菲海軍航空隊 | 15 November 1944 | postwar | | |
| Hokutai Air Group | 北臺海軍航空隊 | 15 June 1945 | postwar | | |
| Hokutō Air Group | 北東海軍航空隊 | 1 October 1944 | postwar | H | |
| Inshi Air Group | 印支海軍航空隊 | 15 May 1945 | postwar | | |
| Kantō Air Group | 關東海軍航空隊 | 10 July 1944 | postwar | | |
| Kinki Air Group | 近畿海軍航空隊 | 15 July 1945 | postwar | | |
| Kyūshū Air Group | 九州海軍航空隊 | 10 July 1944 | postwar | | |
| Marai Air Group | 馬來海軍航空隊 | 1 October 1944 | postwar | | |
| Mariana Air Group | マリアナ海軍航空隊 | 10 July 1944 | postwar | | Honorable death on 10 August 1944 during the Battle of Guam. |
| Naikai Air Group | 内海海軍航空隊 | 10 May 1945 | postwar | | |
| Nanpi Air Group | 南菲海軍航空隊 | 15 November 1944 | postwar | | |
| Nanpōshotō Air Group | 南方諸島海軍航空隊 | 10 July 1944 | 30 April 1945 | | Honorable death on 17 March 1945 during the Battle of Iwo Jima. |
| Nanseishotō Air Group | 南西諸島海軍航空隊 | 10 July 1944 | postwar | | |
| Nantai Air Group | 南臺海軍航空隊 | 15 June 1945 | postwar | | |
| Nishikarorin Air Group | 西カロリン海軍航空隊 | 10 July 1944 | postwar | | |
| Ōu Air Group | 奧羽海軍航空隊 | 20 June 1945 | postwar | | |
| Saikai Air Group | 西海海軍航空隊 | 20 March 1945 | postwar | S | |
| San'in Air Group | 山陰海軍航空隊 | 5 May 1945 | postwar | | |
| Taiwan Air Group | 臺灣海軍航空隊 | 10 July 1944 | 15 June 1945 | | Divided the Hokutai Air Group and Nantai Air Group on 15 June 1945. |
| Tōin Air Group | 東印海軍航空隊 | 1 October 1944 | postwar | | |
| Tōkai Air Group | 東海海軍航空隊 | 20 June 1945 | postwar | | |

== Appendix ==
=== Carrier Aircraft Group ===
==== Until January 1944 ====
- Aircraft carrier

| Name | Kanji | Tail code | Note, fate |
|---|---|---|---|
| Akagi Aircraft Group | 赤城飛行機隊 | ハ (Ha, 26 June 1926); V (Early in 1941–31 March 1941); AI (1 April 1941–13 July 1942) | Akagi sunk on 6 June 1942. |
| Hiryū Aircraft Group | 飛龍飛行機隊 | ヘ (October 1939); QII (15 November 1940); VI (Early in 1941–31 March 1941); BII (1 April 1941–13 July 1942) | Hiryū sunk on 6 June 1942. |
| Hiyō Aircraft Group | 飛鷹飛行機隊 | DI (25 August 1942–31 October 1942); A2-1 (1 November 1942–spring 1943); A2-2 or 2-2 (spring 1943–31 August 1943) | Aircraft and airmen were moved to the 26th Air Flotilla on 1 September 1943. |
| Hiyō Aircraft Group (II) | 飛鷹飛行機隊 | A2-2 (1 September 1943–14 February 1944) | Aircraft and airmen were moved to 652nd Air Group on 15 February 1944. |
| Hōshō Aircraft Group | 鳳翔飛行機隊 | A (January 1922–June 1926) ロ (Ro, 26 June 1926–October 1936); L (1937); GII (15 November 1940); CII (1 April 1941) | Dissolved on 20 June 1942. |
| Jun'yō Aircraft Group | 隼鷹飛行機隊 | DII (20 May 1942–31 October 1942); A2-2 (1 November 1942–spring 1943); A2-1 or 2-1 (spring 1943–31 August 1943) | Aircraft and airmen were moved to the 26th Air Flotilla on 1 September 1943. |
| Jun'yō Aircraft Group (II) | 隼鷹飛行機隊 | A2-1 (1 September 1943–14 February 1944) | Aircraft and airmen were moved to the 652nd Air Group on 15 February 1944. |
| Kaga Aircraft Group | 加賀飛行機隊 | ニ (Ni, 26 June 1926); R (1937); K (1937–1939); P (15 November 1940); VI (Early in 1941–31 March 1941); AII (1 April 1941–13 July 1942) | Kaga sunk on 5 June 1942. |
| Kasuga Maru Aircraft Group; Taiyō Aircraft Group | 春日丸飛行機隊 大鷹飛行機隊 | DII (25 September 1941–31 March 1942); CII (14 July 1942–31 October 1942); A3-2 (1 November 1942–14 December 1943) | Taiyō moved to the General Escort Command on 15 December 1943. |
| Ryūhō Aircraft Group | 龍鳳飛行機隊 | A2-3 (13 June 1943–31 August 1943) | Aircraft and airmen were moved to the 26th Air Flotilla on 1 September 1943. |
| Ryūhō Aircraft Group (II) | 龍鳳飛行機隊 | A2-3 (1 September 1943–14 February 1944) | Aircraft and airmen were moved to the 652nd Air Group on 15 February 1944. |
| Ryūjō Aircraft Group | 龍驤飛行機隊 | ホ (Ho, April 1933); R (1937); V (1938); GI (15 November 1940); D (1 April 1941–7 August 1941); DI (8 August 1941–13 July 1942); DIII (14 July 1942–August 1942) | Ryūjō sunk on 24 August 1942. |
| Shōhō Aircraft Group | 祥鳳飛行機隊 | シホ (Shiho, 10 February 1942); DII (1 April 1942–20 May 1942) | Shōhō sunk on 7 May 1942. |
| Shōkaku Aircraft Group | 翔鶴飛行機隊 | EI (25 September 1941–13 July 1942) シカ (Shika, 10 February 1942); EI (14 July 1942–31 October 1942); A1-2 (1 November 1942–14 February 1944) | Aircraft and airmen were moved to the 601st Air Group on 15 February 1944. |
| Sōryū Aircraft Group | 蒼龍飛行機隊 | イ (I, September 1937); W (1937–1939); QI (15 November 1940); VII (Early in 1941–31 March 1941); BI (1 April 1941–13 July 1942) | Sōryū sunk on 5 June 1942. |
| Yawata Maru Aircraft Group; Un'yō Aircraft Group | 八幡丸飛行機隊 雲鷹飛行機隊 | CI (14 July 1942–31 October 1942); A3-1 (1 November 1942–14 November 1943) | Un'yō moved to the General Escort Command on 15 December 1943. |
| Zuihō Aircraft Group | 瑞鳳飛行機隊 | CI (1 April 1941–19 June 1942) スホ (Suho, 10 February 1942); EIII (20 June 1942–31 October 1942); A1-3 (1 November 1942–14 February 1944) | Aircraft and airmen were moved to the 653rd Air Group on 15 February 1944. |
| Zuikaku Aircraft Group | 瑞鶴飛行機隊 | EII (25 September 1941–13 July 1942) スカ (Suka, 10 February 1942); EII (14 July 1942–31 October 1942); A1-1 (1 November 1942–14 February 1944) | Aircraft and airmen were moved to the 601st Air Group on 15 February 1944. |

- Seaplane tender

| Name | Kanji | Tail code | Note, fate |
|---|---|---|---|
| Wakamiya Aircraft Group | 若宮飛行機隊 | D (1922) イ (I, 26 June 1926) | Dissolved in 1926. |
| Notoro Aircraft Group | 能登呂飛行機隊 | ト (To, 26 June 1926) ノトロ (Notoro, c. 1931); 13 (summer 1938); ZI (15 November 1940) | Dissolved on 1 July 1941. |
| Kamoi Aircraft Group | 神威飛行機隊 | モ (Mo, 1933) カモヰ (Kamoi, c. 1936); 5 (August 1937) | Kamoi undertook conversion to a flying boat tender in 1939. |
| Chitose Aircraft Group | 千歳飛行機隊 | チセ (Chise, 1938); FI (15 November 1940); YI (1 April 1941) | Chitose undertook conversion to an aircraft carrier on 26 January 1943. |
| Chiyoda Aircraft Group | 千代田飛行機隊 | チタ (Chita, 1938); 5 (1939); Z (February–November 1939); V1 (14 July 1942) | Chiyoda undertook conversion to an aircraft carrier on 16 January 1943. |
| Mizuho Aircraft Group | 瑞穂飛行機隊 | ミホ (Miho, February 1939); 2 1 (1939); FII (15 November 1940); YII (1 April 1941) | Mizuho had been sunk on 2 May 1942. |
| Nisshin Aircraft Group | 日進飛行機隊 | V2 (14 July 1942) | Nisshin sunk on 22 July 1943. |
| Kinugasa Maru Aircraft Group | 衣笠丸飛行機隊 | 15 (27 September 1937) | Dissolved on 28 April 1938. |
| Kagu Maru Aircraft Group | 香久丸飛行機隊 | ? (25 August 1937–14 October 1938) | Dissolved on 15 October 1938. |
| Kamikawa Maru Aircraft Group | 神川丸飛行機隊 | ZII (15 November 1940); ZI (September 1941); Z (May 1942); YII (14 July 1942); L-1 (1943) | Incorporated to the 958th Air Group on 15 April 1943. |
| Kiyokawa Maru Aircraft Group | 聖川丸飛行機隊 | R (1941); RI (14 July 1942–November 1942) | Renamed 958th Air Group on 1 December 1942. |
| Kimikawa Maru Aircraft Group | 君川丸飛行機隊 | X (December 1941); C21 (1943) | Dissolved on 1 October 1943. |
| Kunikawa Maru Aircraft Group | 國川丸飛行機隊 | YII (November 1942); L-2 (January 1943) | Incorporated to the 958th Air Group on 15 April 1943. |
| Sagara Maru Aircraft Group | 相良丸飛行機隊 | O (1941–March 1942); UVI (July 1942) | Dissolved on 31 October 1942. |
| Sanuki Maru Aircraft Group | 讃岐丸飛行機隊 | IIB (15 November 1940–February 1942); Q (14 July 1942–November 1942) | Dissolved on 1 December 1942. |
| San'yō Maru Aircraft Group | 山陽丸飛行機隊 | ZII (September 1941); W (February 1942); P (14 July 1942) | Dissolved on 1 October 1943. |
| Noshirogawa Maru Aircraft Group | 能代川丸飛行機隊 | ? (1 July 1941–31 August 1941) | Dissolved on 1 September 1941. |

==== After February 1944 ====
| Naval Air Group | Naval vessel | Tail code |
|---|---|---|
| 601st Air Group (for 1st Carrier Division) | Aircraft carrier Taihō | 311 or 1_{1} (7 March 1944–14 August 1944) |
| 601st Air Group (for 1st Carrier Division) | Aircraft carrier Zuikaku | 312 or 1_{2} (15 February 1944–14 August 1944) |
| 601st Air Group (for 1st Carrier Division) | Aircraft carrier Shōkaku | 313 or 1_{3} (15 February 1944–14 August 1944) |
| 601st Air Group (for 1st Carrier Division) | Aircraft carrier Unryū; Aircraft carrier Amagi | 601 (15 August 1944;10 February 1945) |
| 634th Air Group (for 4th Carrier Division) | Battleship Hyūga; Battleship Ise; Aircraft carrier Jun'yō; Aircraft carrier Ryūhō | 634 (1 May 1944–14 November 1944) squadron code (August 1944, temporary) |
| 652nd Air Group (for 2nd Carrier Division) | Aircraft carrier Jun'yō | 321 or 2_{1} (15 February 1944–10 July 1944) |
| 652nd Air Group (for 2nd Carrier Division) | Aircraft carrier Hiyō | 322 or 2_{2} (15 February 1944–10 July 1944) |
| 652nd Air Group (for 2nd Carrier Division) | Aircraft carrier Ryūhō | 323 or 2_{3} (15 February 1944–10 July 1944) |
| 653rd Air Group (for 3rd Carrier Division) | Aircraft carrier Chitose | 331 or 3_{1} (15 February 1944–14 August 1944); 653 3 (15 August 1944–15 November 1944) |
| 653rd Air Group (for 3rd Carrier Division) | Aircraft carrier Chiyoda | 332 or 3_{2} (15 February 1944–14 August 1944); 653 4 (15 August 1944–15 November 1944) |
| 653rd Air Group (for 3rd Carrier Division) | Aircraft carrier Zuihō | 333 or 3_{3} (15 February 1944–14 August 1944); 653 2 (15 August 1944–15 November 1944) |
| 653rd Air Group (for 3rd Carrier Division) | Aircraft carrier Zuikaku | 653 1 (15 August 1944–15 November 1944) |
| 931st Air Group (for General Escort Command) | Aircraft carrier Taiyō; Aircraft carrier Un'yō; Aircraft carrier Kaiyō; Aircraft carrier Shin'yō | KEB (1 February 1944) |

== See also ==
- Kōkūtai
- List of Air Fleet of the Imperial Japanese Navy
- List of Imperial Japanese Navy carrier division and air flotilla
- List of Imperial Japanese Navy flying squadron

== Bibliography ==
- Hata, Ikuhiko; Izawa, Yasuho; Shores, Christopher (2011). Japanese Naval Air Force Fighter Units and their aces, 1932-1945. London, UK: Grub Street. ISBN 9781906502843.
- Lundstrom, John B. (2005a). The First Team: Pacific Naval Air Combat from Pearl Harbor to Midway (New ed.). Annapolis, Maryland: Naval Institute Press. ISBN 1-59114-471-X.
- Lundstrom, John B. (2005b). First Team and the Guadalcanal Campaign: Naval Fighter Combat from August to November 1942 (New ed.). Annapolis, Maryland: Naval Institute Press. ISBN 1-59114-472-8.
- Tagaya, Osamu (2001). Mitsubishi Type 1 Rikko 'Betty' Units of World War 2. Osprey Combat Aircraft #22. Osprey Publishing. ISBN 184176082X.
- Shin-Jinbutsuoraisha Co., Ltd., Tōkyō, Japan.
  - Kingendaishi Hensankai, Military history of the Imperial Japanese Navy Air Groups and Imperial Japanese Army Flying Regiments, 2001, ISBN 4-404-02945-4.
  - Rekishi Dokuhon, Document of the war No. 52 Naval Air Group and Kamikaze, 2001, ISBN 4-404-02757-5.
- Air World, Air World Inc., Tōkyō, Japan.
  - Special issue Photo album of Imperial Japanese Navy Aircraft in World War II, 1987.
- Bunrin-Dō Co., Ltd., Tōkyō, Japan.
  - Famous airplanes of the world
    - No. 27, Type 96 Carrier Fighter, 1991.
    - No. 32, Type 97 Carrier Torpedo Bomber, 1992.
    - No. 33, Type 99 Carrier Dive Bomber, 1992.
    - No. 44, Type 93 Intermediate Trainer, 1994.
    - No. 47, Imperial Japanese Navy Reconnaissance Seaplane, 1994.
    - No. 49, Type 2 Flying boat, 1994, ISBN 4-89319-046-6.
    - No. 55, Type Zero Carrier Fighter Model 11–21, 1995, ISBN 4-89319-052-0.
    - No. 56, Type Zero Carrier Fighter Model 22–63, 1996, ISBN 4-89319-053-9.
    - No. 57, Navy Night Fighter "Gekko", 1996, ISBN 4-89319-054-7.
    - No. 59, Type 1 Attack Bomber, 1996, ISBN 4-89319-056-3.
    - No. 61, Navy Interceptor "Raiden", 1996, ISBN 4-89319-058-X.
    - No. 69, Navy Carrier Dive-Bomber "Suisei", 1998, ISBN 4-89319-066-0.
    - No. 91, Type 96 Attack Bomber, 2001, ISBN 4-893-19089X.
    - No. 108, Carrier Reconnaissance Plane "Saiun", 2005, ISBN 4-89319-119-5.
    - No. 124, Kyofu, Shiden, Shidenkai, 2007, ISBN 978-4-89319-158-8.
    - No. 130, Type 99 Carrier Dive Bomber, 2009, ISBN 978-489319-171-7.
    - No. 136, Navy Type Zero Observation Seaplane, 2009, ISBN 978-489319-183-0.
    - Special Edition Vol. 1, Navy Bomber "Ginga" [Frances], 2000, ISBN 4-89319-081-4.
    - Special Edition Vol. 6, Type Zero Carrier Fighter, 2012, ISBN 4-89319-208-6.
  - Koku-Fan Illustrated
    - No. 42, Japanese Imperial Army & Navy Aircraft Color, Markig, 1988.
    - No. 96, Photo history of the 302nd Naval Air Group "San-Maru-Futa", 1997.
  - Koku-Fan Illustrated Special
    - Japanese Military Aircraft Illustrated Vol. 1, Fighters, 1982.
    - Japanese Military Aircraft Illustrated Vol. 2, Bombers, 1982.
    - Japanese Military Aircraft Illustrated Vol. 3, Reconnaissance / Flying boat / Trainer / Transport, 1983.
- Ushio Shobō (Ushioshobokojinsha Co., Ltd.), Tōkyō, Japan.
  - The Maru Graphic Quarterly
    - No. 9, Photo album of Japanese Fighters, 1972.
    - No. 10, Photo album of Japanese Bombers, 1972.
  - The Maru Special
    - Japanese Naval Vessels No. 2, Aircraft carrier Akagi / Kaga, 1975.
    - Japanese Naval Vessels No. 16, Aircraft carrier Ryūjō / Hōshō, 1978.
    - Japanese Naval Vessels No. 25, Japanese seaplane tenders w/ auxiliary seaplane tenders, 1979.
    - Japanese Naval Vessels No. 56, Japanese aircraft carriers III, 1979.
    - Japanese Naval Vessels No. 126, Japanese aircraft carriers I, 1987.
    - Japanese Naval Vessels No. 127, Japanese aircraft carriers II / Japanese seaplane tenders I, 1987.
    - Japanese Naval Vessels No. 128, Japanese aircraft carriers III / Japanese seaplane tenders II, 1987.
    - Japanese Naval Vessels No. 129, Japanese aircraft carriers in wartime I, 1987.
    - Japanese Naval Vessels No. 130, Japanese aircraft carriers in wartime II / Japanese seaplane tenders III, 1987.
    - Japanese Naval Vessels No. 131, Japanese aircraft carriers in wartime III, 1988.
    - Warship Mechanism Vol. 3, Mechanisms of Japanese 29 Aircraft Carriers, 1981.
  - The Maru Mechanic
    - No. 12, Type 0 Reconnaissance Seaplane, 1978.
    - No. 15, Nakajima C6N1 Carrier Reconnaissance-plane "Saiun" C6N, 1979.
    - No. 18, Nakajima Type 97 Carrier Torpedo Bomber B5N, 1979.
    - No. 19, Kawanishi Type 2 Flying boat H8K, 1979.
    - No. 20, Mitsubishi Type 0 Obseravation Seaplane F1M (Pete), 1980.
    - No. 24, Kawanishi Type 2 Flying boat (H8K2) 426, 1980.
    - No. 27, Naval Aero-Technical Arsenal Carrier Dive Bomber "Suisei comet D4Y", 1981.
    - No. 28, Mitsubishi Type 96 Carrier Fighter (A5M), 1981.
    - No. 30, Nakajima carrier torpedo bomber "Tenzan" B6N, 1981.
    - No. 31, Douglas DC-3 / L2D Type Zero Navy Transport, 1981.
    - No. 34, Aichi Navy Type 99 Carrier Dive-Bomber (D3A), 1982.
    - No. 36, Kawanishi Navy Type 94 Reconnaissance Seaplane (E7K), 1982.
    - No. 46, Naval Aero-Technical Arsenal Bomber "Ginga" P1Y / Mitsubishi Type 1 Attack Bomber G4M (Betty), 1984.
- Model Art, Model Art Co. Ltd., Tōkyō, Japan.
  - No. 242, Special issue Zero Fighter, 1984.
  - No. 272, Special issue Camouflage & Markings of Imperial Japanese Navy Fighters in W.W.II, 1986.
  - No. 304, Special issue Kawanishi N1K1/N1K2-J, 1987.
  - No. 378, Special issue Pearl Harbor, 1991.
  - No. 406, Special issue Camouflage & Markings of Imperial Japanese Navy Bombers in W.W.II, 1993.
  - No. 431, 1994.
  - No. 439, Special issue Heroes of the Imperial Japanese Navy Air Force in 1937–1945, 1994.
  - No. 458, Special issue Imperial Japanese Navy Air Force Suicide Attack Unit "Kamikaze", 1995.
  - No. 470, Special issue I.J.N. Interceptor Fighter Raiden (J2M series), 1996.
  - No. 500, 1997.
  - No. 510, Special issue Camouflage & Markings of the I.J.N. Fighters, 1998.
  - No. 525, Special issue Shūsui and Jet aircraft / Rocket aircraft of the Imperial Japanese Army and Navy, 1998.
  - No. 532, 1999.
  - No. 541, Special issue Type 2 Flying Boat and Imperial Japanese Navy Flying Boats, 1999.
  - No. 553, Special issue I.J.N. Carrier Attack Bomber, 2000.
  - No. 565, Special issue Imperial Japanese Navy Seaplanes, 2000.
  - No. 573, Special issue Pearl Harbor (New Edition), 2000.
  - No. 587, Special issue Imperial Japanese Navy Fighter N1K1 Kyōfū, N1K1-J Shiden, N1K2-J Shidenkai, 2001.
  - No. 595, Special issue Night fighters of the Imperial Japanese Army and Navy, 2001.
  - No. 640, 2003.
  - No. 666, 2004.
  - No. 831, Special issue Model Art Profile No. 11, "Raiden of Imperial Japanese Navy (Mitsubishi J2M)", 2011.
  - No. 847, Special issue Model Art Profile No. 12, "A6M of IJN (Part 1)", 2012.
  - No. 857, Special issue Model Art Profile No. 13, "A6M of IJN (Part 2)", 2012.
- Rekishi Gunzō, History of Pacific War, Gakken, Tōkyō, Japan.
  - Vol. 13, Shōkaku class aircraft carrier, 1997, ISBN 4-05-601426-4.
  - Extra, Perfect guide, The aircraft carriers of the Imperial Japanese Navy & Army, 2003, ISBN 4-05-603055-3.
- Ships of the world, Kaijinsha Co., Ltd., Tōkyō, Japan.
  - No. 481, Special issue Vol. 40, History of Japanese aircraft carriers, 1994.
  - No. 736, Special issue Vol. 95, History of Japanese aircraft carriers, 2011.
- Koei, Kanagawa Prefecture, Japan.
  - Aero Military Collection #2, Japanese Navy Fighter part 1, 2005, ISBN 4-7758-0262-3.
  - Aero Military Collection #5, Japanese Navy Fighter part 2, 2006, ISBN 4-7758-0373-5.
- Japan Center for Asian Historical Records (http://www.jacar.go.jp/english/index.html), National Archives of Japan, Tokyo, Japan.
  - Reference Code: C12070201700, Administrative Order, January–March 1944, Naval Minister's Secretariat/Ministry of the Navy, 1944.
  - Reference Code: C12070204300, Administrative Order, March 1945, Naval Minister's Secretariat/Ministry of the Navy, 1945.
  - And other each volumes. (a lot of notice of the Imperial Japanese Navy.)
