= Yokosuka Naval Base =

Yokosuka Naval Base may refer to:

- United States Fleet Activities Yokosuka, the present United States naval base located next to the city, beginning in 1945
- JMSDF Yokosuka Naval Base (横須賀基地_(海上自衛隊)), which hosts the headquarters of the Japanese Maritime Self Defense Force as well as several major units assigned to the District Force.
- Yokosuka Naval District was a historical administrative district established under the Imperial Japanese Navy in 1886. Many of its facilities and units over time were located in the city of Yokosuka where they constituted a large naval base complex whose site is now mostly occupied by the current US and JMSDF bases.

Related:

- JMSDF Yokosuka District Force (横須賀地方隊), a modern naval district of Japan's territorial waters (see Japan Maritime Self-Defense Force#Organization, formations and structure)

JMSDF Districts

- Naval Air Technical Arsenal at Yokosuka, an aircraft manufacturing facility under control of the Imperial Japanese Navy located in the city from the 1910s to the 1930s.
- Yokosuka Naval Arsenal, a shipyard located outside the city from the 1860s to 1945
- Yokosuka Naval Airfield a WWII-era airfield
