= Hatsuo =

- Gender: Male

Origin
- Origin: Japanese
- Meaning: Different meanings depending on the kanji used

Hatsuo (written: 初雄 or 初男) is a masculine Japanese given name. Notable people with the name include:

- Hatsuo Hidaka (日高 初男; born 1915), Japanese World War II flying ace
- Hatsuo Royama (盧山 初雄; born 1948), Japanese karateka
