= Takao Air Group =

Unit of the Imperial Japanese Navy Air Service (IJNAS) during the Pacific War

- Active: 1 April 1938 – 1 October 1942
- Country: Empire of Japan
- Branch: (Empire of Japan) Imperial Japanese Navy
- Type: Naval aviation unit
- Role: Medium Bomber
- Part of: 23rd Air Flotilla, 11th Air Fleet / Southwest Area Fleet
- Garrison/HQ: Kaohsiung; Kendari; Kupang; Rabaul
- Aircraft flown: Mitsubishi G3M; Mitsubishi G4M
- Engagements: World War II: Philippines campaign; Battle of Bataan; Battle of Corregidor; Dutch East Indies campaign; Air raids on Australia; Guadalcanal Campaign

Commanders
- Notable commanders: Tarō Nonaka; Gorō Katsumi; Shigeji Makino

The Takao Air Group (高雄航空隊, Takao Kōkūtai) was a unit of the Imperial Japanese Navy Air Service (IJNAS) during the Pacific War that was involved in the Philippines campaign, Dutch East Indies campaign, air raids on Australia, and the Guadalcanal Campaign. The air group was redesignated as the 753rd Air Group on 1 October 1942.

== History ==
=== Southeast Asia ===
The group was formed on 1 April 1938 as a medium bomber unit and was initially equipped with Mitsubishi G3M bombers. In May 1940, it became the first unit to receive the new Mitsubishi G4M bombers. In 1941 the unit moved to Hankou to participate in operations in Central China.

Prior to the outbreak of Pacific War, half of the group was sent to Saigon, Indochina to participate in invasion of Malaya, while the other half was stationed at Kaohsiung on Taiwan to participate in the invasion of Philippines. On 8 December, the group's Hikōtaichō Lieutenant Commander Tarō Nonaka led 27 Takao medium bombers in an attack against Iba Airfield. They were escorted by Mitsubishi A6M Zero fighters from 3rd Air Group, which would continue to operate together as part of 23rd Air Flotilla. They attacked various targets in the Philippines until 28 December. From 29 December to 6 January, they focused on bombing Allied positions on Corregidor. Throughout the rest of January, they conducted sorties against targets on Borneo and in February moved their focus on Java in Dutch East Indies. On 27 February, Lieutenant Jirō Adachi led 16 medium bombers in a level bombing attack on the US seaplane tender Langley, which sank her.

On 14 March, one half of the group moved to Kupang on Timor to make attacks on Northern Australia. The other half moved back to the Philippines to help break the Allied resistance on Bataan and Corregidor. After the Allied forces surrendered to the Philippines, this half of the group moved to Kupang on 17 April in order to join the other half in Air raids on Australia

=== Australia 1942 ===
The first major raid occurred on 16 March, where Lieutenant Hiroshi Mine led 14 medium bombers against Darwin. There were no enemy fighters yet stationed at Darwin at that time, thus they suffered no losses. This soon changed with the arrival of USAAF 49th Pursuit Group equipped with Curtiss P-40 Warhawk fighters. In an unescorted raid of seven medium bombers on 28 March, the group suffered one bomber shot down by the intercepting enemy fighters. From that point on, all daytime raids were escorted by fighters from the 3rd Air Group. Similar smaller raids were conducted on 30 and 31 March and 4 and 5 April, where they suffered a loss of three bombers out of six on the 4th. On 25 April, the group's new Hikōtaichō Lieutenant Commander Gorō Katsumi led a formation of 24 G4M medium bombers to attack Darwin, where they were intercepted by a large force of Warhawks that shot down four bombers. Two days later, Lieutenant Tanemasa Hirata led 16 medium bombers to attack Darwin. The raid was again intercepted by a large force of Warhawks, but this time 3rd Air Group fighter did their job well and no bombers were shot down. When the Allies started to raid the Kupang airfield in return, Takao Air Group (as well as the 3rd Air Group) moved further back to Kendari. In addition, raids on Darwin were suspended until June in order for Takao Air Group to replenish the lost aircraft.

On 13 June, the raids against Darwin resumed and Lieutenant Commander Katsumi led 27 medium bombers to attack an airfield there. On 15 June, Lieutenant Hirata led 27 medium bombers in another major raid on Darwin. The next day, Lieutenant Hirata again led 27 bombers to escort 27 G4M medium bombers there. In all these three major raids a large number of Warhawks intercepted the formations but no losses to the bombers occurred. In defense of the bombers, the escorting Zero fighter from the 3rd Air Group managed to shoot down 10 Warhawks for the loss of two of their own in return. No further daytime attacks were conducted until 30 July, when Lieutenant Commander Katsumi led 26 G4M medium bombers in a major raid on Darwin. The final daytime raid on Darwin occurred on 23 August, when Lieutenant Hirata led 27 G4M medium bombers and the intercepting Warhawks managed to shoot down one bomber. At that point, all further operations against Darwin were suspended until 1943.

=== Guadalcanal ===
As the fighting over Guadalcanal intensified, 23rd Air Flotilla loaned a portion of 3rd Air Group to 25th Air Flotilla at Rabaul. On 22 September, Lieutenant Shigeji Makino brought a detachment of 20 medium bombers to Rabaul. Their first mission against Guadalcanal was flown on 27 September, when a combined force of 18 medium bombers from Kisarazu and Takao Air Groups under the command of Lieutenants Miyoshi Nabeta (Kisarazu) and Makino attacked Guadalcanal. They were intercepted by a large force of US Marine and US Navy Grumman F4F Wildcat fighters, which resulted in two bombers being shot down. The next day, a combined force of 27 medium bombers from Kisarazu, Kisarazu and Takao Air Groups attacked Guadalcanal again. This time five bombers were lost to 35 intercepting Wildcat fighters.

On 1 October, the unit was redesignated as the 753rd Air Group. The group's bombers aborted two major raids on 11 and 12 October due to bad weather. However, on 13 October Lieutenant Makino led a combined force of 27 medium bombers from 753rd, Kisarazu and Kisarazu Air Groups that bombed Henderson Field on Guadalcanal and damaged dozen of aircraft on the ground as well as destroyed significant fuel storage. On 15 October, Lieutenant Makino again led another attack on Guadalcanal, this time with 23 medium bombers from 753rd, Kisarazu and Kisarazu Air Groups. The last mission against Guadalcanal for 753rd Air Group was on 25 October, before the detachment returned to their base in East Indies.

=== Australia 1943 ===
At the beginning of 1943, the 753rd Air Group again began operations against Darwin in Australia. This time they faced newly arrived Supermarine Spitfire fighters from RAAF No. 1 Wing. On 15 March, Lieutenant Kawamoto led 16 medium bombers to attack Darwin. On 2 May, Lieutenant Hirata led 25 medium bombers in another mission against Darwin. The raids resumed one month later on 28 June with nine medium bombers. On 30 June, Lieutenant Hirata led 23 medium bombers in a major raid targeting Fenton Airfield south of Darwin. Another raid on Fenton was conducted on 6 July, when Lieutenant Hirata led 26 medium bombers to bomb the airfield. In these raids during 1943, the escorting Zeros from 202nd Air Group (ex-3rd) protected the bombers well, since only four were lost. Furthermore, they completely outmatched Spitfires, since 38 of them were shot down for the loss of six Zeros. From 6 July, the 753rd Air Group suspended daytime raids and continued with night raids only.

== Sources ==
- Hata, Ikuhiko; Izawa, Yasuho; Shores, Christopher (2011). Japanese Naval Air Force Fighter Units and their aces, 1932-1945. London, UK: Grub Street. ISBN 9781906502843.
- Ingman, Peter (2020). P-40E Warhawk vs A6M2 Zero-sen: East Indies and Darwin 1942. Duel. Osprey Publishing. ISBN 978-1472840875.
- Ingman, Peter (2019). Spitfire VC vs A6M2/3 Zero-sen: Darwin 1943. Duel. Osprey Publishing. ISBN 978-1472821447.
- Lundstrom, John B. (2005b). First Team and the Guadalcanal Campaign: Naval Fighter Combat from August to November 1942 (New ed.). Annapolis, Maryland: Naval Institute Press. ISBN 1-59114-472-8.
- Tagaya, Osamu (2001). Mitsubishi Type 1 Rikko 'Betty' Units of World War 2. Osprey Combat Aircraft #22. Osprey Publishing. ISBN 184176082X.

=== Combat reports ===
- 海軍大臣官房. 高雄空飛行機隊戦闘行動調書 (Report). Japan Center for Asian Historical Records.
- 海軍大臣官房. 753空飛行機隊戦闘行動調書 (Report). Japan Center for Asian Historical Records.
