= 3rd Air Group =

Unit of the Imperial Japanese Navy Air Service (IJNAS) during the Pacific War

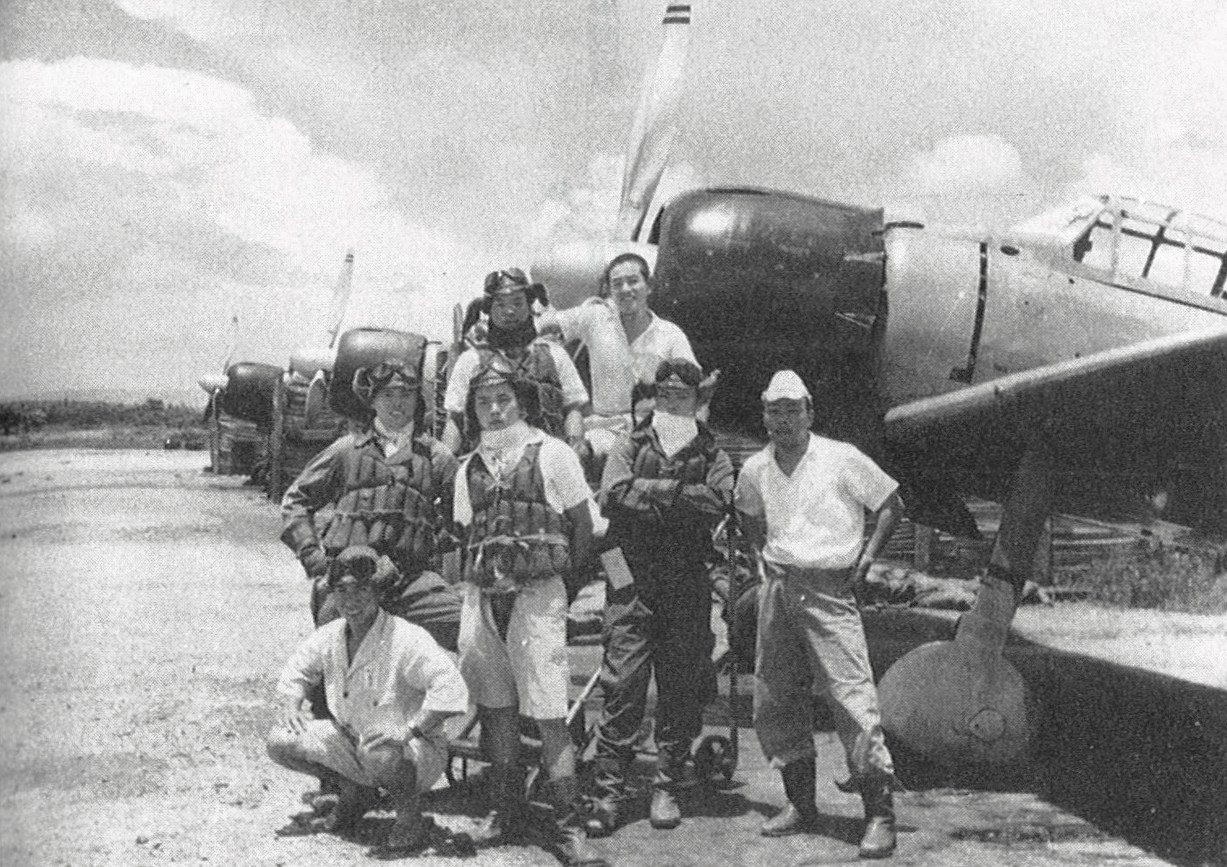
- Pilots of 202nd Air Group (renamed 3rd Air Group) at Kupang, Timor
- Active: 10 April 1942 – 1 November 1942
- Country: Empire of Japan
- Branch: (Empire of Japan) Imperial Japanese Navy
- Type: Naval aviation unit
- Role: Fighter
- Part of: 23rd Air Flotilla, 11th Air Fleet / Southwest Area Fleet
- Garrison/HQ: Kaohsiung; Kendari; Kupang; Rabaul
- Aircraft flown: Mitsubishi A6M Zero
- Engagements: World War II: Philippines campaign; Dutch East Indies campaign; Air raids on Australia; Guadalcanal Campaign; Naval Battle of Guadalcanal (Note: As 202nd Air Group.)

Commanders
- Notable commanders: Tamotsu Yokoyama; Takahide Aioi; Minoru Suzuki

The 3rd Air Group (第三航空隊, Dai-san Kōkūtai) was a unit of the Imperial Japanese Navy Air Service (IJNAS) during the Pacific War that was involved in the Philippines campaign, Dutch East Indies campaign, air raids on Australia, and the Guadalcanal Campaign. The air group was redesignated as the 202nd Air Group on 1 November 1942.

== History ==
=== Southeast Asia ===
The group was formed on 10 April 1941 and was originally a medium bomber unit. However, in September it was reformed and became a fighter unit with an initial strength of 54 Mitsubishi A6M Zero fighters and six Mitsubishi C5M reconnaissance aircraft. Prior to the outbreak of Pacific War, a small detachment was sent to operate over Malaya, while the majority of the group was stationed at Kaohsiung on Taiwan to participate in the invasion of Philippines. On 8 December, group's Hikōtaichō Lieutenant Yokoyama led the fighters to escort Mitsubishi G4M medium bombers from Takao Air Group and Kanoya Air Group in an attack against Iba Airfield. After the capture of Davao City, 3rd Air Group moved to an airfield there on 23 December and supported various landings around the area. As the Japanese forces advanced into the Dutch East Indies in 1942, the unit first moved to Menado, Celebes on 11 January, then to Kendari, Celebes on 25 January, and finally to Balikpapan, Borneo on 2 February. From there, Lieutenant Yokoyama led 27 Zero fighters to escort a major raid of 72 Mitsubishi G3M and G4M medium bombers against Surabaya and Denpasar, which cost the Allies around ten aircraft. Several smaller-scale attacks continued throughout February.

=== Australia 1942 ===
After the end of the Dutch East Indies campaign, the group was stationed at Kupang on Timor and by March Lieutenant Yokoyama was replaced by Lieutenant Takahide Aioi as Hikōtaichō. From there the group started to conduct air raids on Australia. On 2 March, Buntaichō Lieutenant Zenjirō Miyano led nine Zero fighters in the Attack on Broome that destroyed seven enemy land aircraft and 15 flying boats. The first escort mission for medium bombers against Darwin occurred on 16 March, where Lieutenant (jg) Kawazoe Toshitada led only four Zero fighters. No air combat occurred as there were no enemy fighters stationed at Darwin at that time. This soon changed with the arrival of USAAF 9th Pursuit Squadron equipped with Curtiss P-40 Warhawk fighters. On 30 March, Lieutenant Takeo Kurosawa led 12 Zero fighters to escort nine G4M medium bombers of Takao Air Group to Darwin. In the ensuing air combat with Warhawks, the Japanese suffered no losses and shot down one Warhawk. The next day a similar scenario occurred but no side suffered any losses. On 4 April, six G4M medium bombers of Takao Air Group and six Zero fighters from 3rd Air Group again attacked Darwin and were intercepted by seven Warhawks, which resulted in a loss of three bombers and two Warhawks. 9th Pursuit Squadron was reinforced by the other two squadrons from the 49th Pursuit Group and 3rd Air Group Zeros faced increased opposition. On 25 April, Lieutenant Aioi led 15 Zero fighters to escort 24 G4M medium bombers to Darwin and the engagement with Warhawks cost four bombers and one Zero fighter. Two days later, Lieutenant Kurosawa led 21 Zero fighters to escort 16 G4M medium bombers to Darwin. The raid was intercepted by 25 Warhawks and the 3rd Air Group managed to shoot down three of them for no loss. As the enemy started to raid Kupang airfield in return, 3rd Air Group (as well as Takao Air Group) moved further back to Kendari, and raids on Darwin were suspended until June in order for Takao Air Group to rebuild.

On 13 June, the raids against Darwin resumed and Lieutenant Aioi led a strong force of 45 Zero fighters to escort 27 G4M medium bombers. The raid was intercepted by Warhawks of the 49th Pursuit Group and the resulting air combat accounted for five Warhawks and two Zeros shot down. The next day 3rd Air Group's 27 Zero fighters under Lieutenant Tadatsune Tokaji performed a fighter sweep without Takao Air Group bombers, which resulted in one Warhawk shot down for no loss of Zeros. On 15 June, 27 G4M medium bombers of Takao Air Group and 21 Zero fighters from 3rd Air Group under Lieutenant Kurosawa again attacked Darwin and were intercepted by 28 Warhawks. The Zeros shot down two Warhawks while protecting the bombers and suffered no losses. The next day, Lieutenant Aioi led 27 Zero fighters to escort 27 G4M medium bombers. 18 Warhawks intercepted and the Zeros shot down three of them for no loss in return. No further attacks were conducted by the 3rd Air group until 30 July, when Lieutenant Aioi led 26 Zero fighters to escort 26 G4M medium bombers. The air combat over Darwin accounted for one Warhawk and one Zero. The final day-time raid on Darwin occurred on 23 August when 27 G4M medium bombers were escorted by 27 Zeros of the 3rd Air Group led by Lieutenant Tokaji. The intercepting 36 Warhawks managed to shoot down one bomber and four Zeros; Tokaji was one of the pilots killed in action. All further operations against Darwin were suspended until 1943.

=== Guadalcanal ===
As the fighting over Guadalcanal intensified, 23rd Air Flotilla loaned a portion of 3rd Air Group to 25th Air Flotilla at Rabaul. On 17 September, 21 Zero fighters and 27 pilots under the command of Lieutenant Aioi were ferried to Rabaul by the carrier Taiyō. Their first mission against Guadalcanal was flown on 27 September, when Lieutenant Aioi led 26 Zeros to escort 18 G4M medium bombers from Kisarazu and Takao Air Groups. They were intercepted by a large force of US Marine and US Navy Grumman F4F Wildcat fighters, which resulted in two bombers and one Zero shot down. On 29 September, Lieutenant Aioi led 27 Zeros in a fighter sweep over Guadalcanal, where they were engaged by 14 US Navy Wildcats. Only Zeros from Lieutenant Sadao Yamaguchi's division actually fought the Wildcats and managed to shoot down two for the loss of two zeros. Throughout October, smaller portions of 3rd Air Group would continue to fly missions against Guadalcanal in mixed teams with Tainan, 2nd and 751st Air Groups. The 3rd Air Group was redesignated as the 202nd Air Group on 1 November and was then withdrawn to Japan on 8 November. During the Guadalcanal campaign they lost eight aircraft and six pilots.

=== Australia 1943 ===
At the beginning of 1943, the 202nd again began operations against Darwin in Australia. The first mission took place on 2 March, when Lieutenant Commander Aioi led 21 Zeros in a low-level approach and strafed the airfield, destroying one Bristol Beaufighter on the ground. Newly arrived Supermarine Spitfire fighters from RAAF No. 1 Wing scrambled and engaged the withdrawing Zeros, however, there were no losses. After the mission, Lieutenant Aioi was replaced as a Hikōtaichō. On 15 March, 16 G4M medium bombers of 753rd Air Group (ex-Takao) were escorted by 27 Zero fighters to attack Darwin. In the air combat over Darwin, the 202nd Air Group shot down four Spitfires for the loss of a single Zero. On 2 May, the group's new Hikōtaichō Lieutenant Commander Suzuki led 26 Zero fighters to escort 25 G4M medium bombers in another mission against Darwin. This time 202nd Air Group Zeros completely outmatched Spitfires by shooting down five of them, while another nine force-landed for various reasons. No losses of Zeros or bombers occurred on this occasion. On 10 and 28 May 202nd Air Group's Zero fighter attacked Milingimbi Island. On the former date, one Zero were lost for one Spitfire shot down, while on the latter they shot down two Spitfires for no loss, however, two escorted bomber were lost.

The attacks resumed one month later on 28 June, when nine medium bombers were escorted to Darwin by 27 Zeros under Lieutenant Commander Suzuki Suzuki. RAAF scrambled 42 Spitfires but neither side suffered any combat losses. A major raid targeting Fenton Airfield south of Darwin took place on 30 June, when Lieutenant Commander Suzuki led 27 Zero fighters to escort 23 G4M medium bombers. They were met by a large force of 39 intercepting Spitfires and four of them were shot down for no loss of Zeros or bombers. Another raid on Fenton was conducted on 6 July, where 26 escorting 202nd Air Group fighters met with 33 intercepting Spitfires. The engagement ended up with five Spitfires shot down for no loss of Zeros. While the medium bombers from 753rd Air Group ceased day-time raids against Darwin from that point on, 202nd Air Group 36 Zeros under Lieutenant Commander Suzuki escorted two reconnaissance aircraft over Northern Australia on 7 September. They were intercepted by 36 Spitfires and air combat accounted for one Zero and three Spitfires. During 1943, in the engagements above Australia between 202nd Air Group and No. 1 Wing, 38 Spitfires were destroyed for the loss of six Zeros.

== Sources ==
- Hata, Ikuhiko; Izawa, Yasuho; Shores, Christopher (2011). Japanese Naval Air Force Fighter Units and their aces, 1932-1945. London, UK: Grub Street. ISBN 9781906502843.
- Ingman, Peter (2020). P-40E Warhawk vs A6M2 Zero-sen: East Indies and Darwin 1942. Duel. Osprey Publishing. ISBN 1472840879.
- Ingman, Peter (2019). Spitfire VC vs A6M2/3 Zero-sen: Darwin 1943. Duel. Osprey Publishing. ISBN 1472821440.
- Lundstrom, John B. (2005b). First Team and the Guadalcanal Campaign: Naval Fighter Combat from August to November 1942 (New ed.). Annapolis, Maryland: Naval Institute Press. ISBN 1-59114-472-8.
- Tagaya, Osamu (2001). Mitsubishi Type 1 Rikko 'Betty' Units of World War 2. Osprey Combat Aircraft #22. Osprey Publishing. ISBN 184176082X.

=== Combat reports ===
- 海軍大臣官房. 3空飛行機隊戦闘行動調書 (Report). Japan Center for Asian Historical Records.
- 海軍大臣官房. 202空飛行機隊戦闘行動調書 (Report). Japan Center for Asian Historical Records.
