= Hatsuo Hidaka =

- 日高 初男
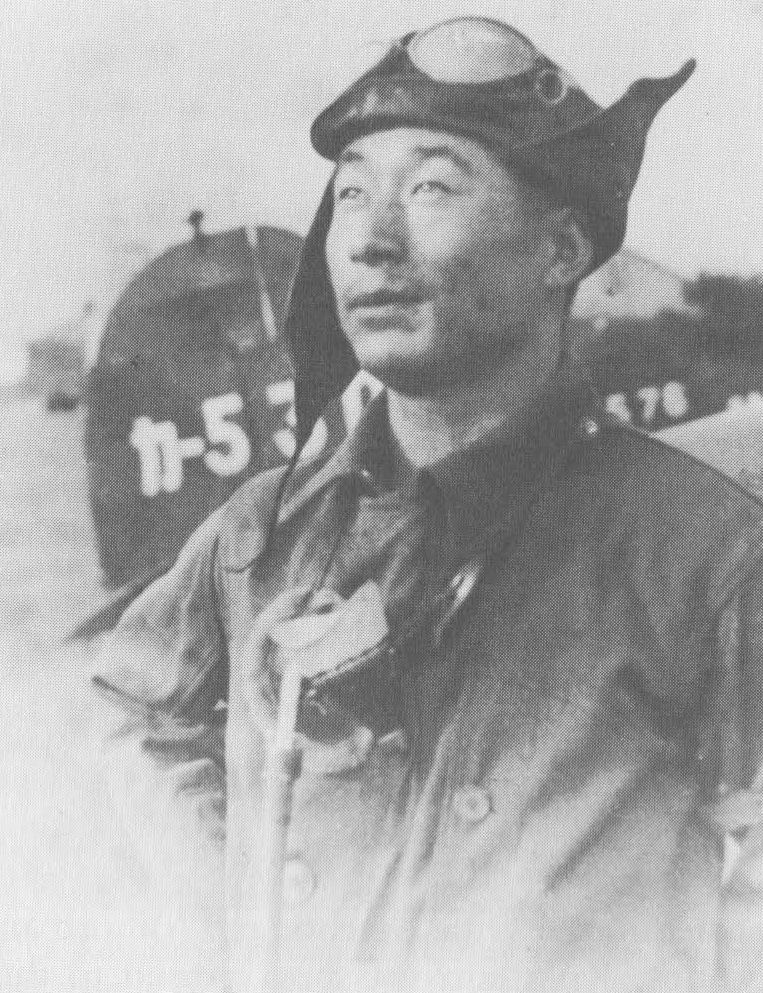
- Hidaka photographed sometime between 1939 and 1942 while serving as an instructor pilot with the Kasumigaura Naval Air Group in Japan
- Born: May 7, 1915; Kagoshima, Japan
- Died: July 15, 2010 (aged 95)
- Military career
- Allegiance: Empire of Japan
- Branch: Imperial Japanese Navy Air Service (IJN)
- Rank: Lieutenant Junior Grade
- Conflicts: Second Sino-Japanese War; World War II; Pacific War

Hatsuo Hidaka (日高 初男, Hidaka Hatsuo; May 7, 1915 – July 15, 2010) was an officer and ace fighter pilot in the Imperial Japanese Navy (IJN) during the Second Sino-Japanese War and the Pacific theater of World War II. Graduating from Kasumigaura Naval Air Group in November 1934, Hidaka joined the first division, the 15th Air Group bound to Hankou as a Petty Officer, 3rd Class on November 1, 1937 bound to Hankou with the flight time of 1,040 hours. During May and July 1943, Hidaka was stationed at Truk Island and often flew to Rabaul airfield on New Britain.

In aerial combat over China and the Pacific, (Note: According to the unclassified official records of the Imperial Japanese Navy, Hidaka destroyed an enemy with 20 20mm and 24 7.7mm bullets on 7 June 1943; On the Rendova Island attack missions, on 3 July 1943, they had combat against 18 F-38 and destroyed three enemies east of Rendova Island under the command of Senior Lieutenant Kisaku Koshida; on 4 July 1943 departing from Buin air field on Bougainville Island, destroyed two and hit one under the command of Senior Lieutenant Masao Shimada; On 5 July 1943, they destroyed four P-39 near Munda, Solomon Islands.) he was officially credited with destroying 11 enemy aircraft. Hidaka survived World War II.
