= Yamada Sadayoshi =

Japanese admiral (1892–1971)

Sadayoshi Yamada
- 山田 定義
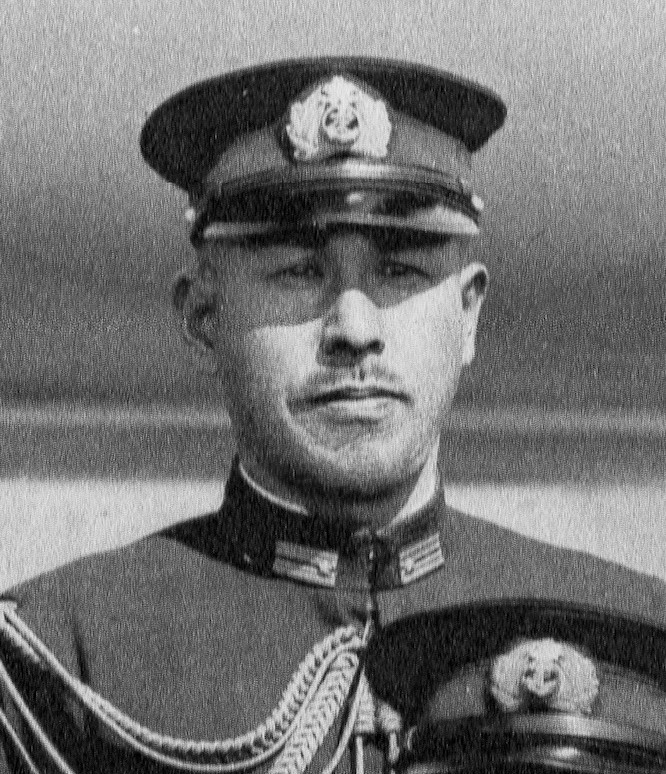
- Yamada as staff of the Combined Fleet & 1st Fleet, 1928-30
- Born: November 26, 1892; Fukuoka Prefecture, Japan
- Died: 16 November 1971 (aged 78)
- Military career
- Allegiance: Empire of Japan
- Branch: Imperial Japanese Navy
- Service years: 1914–1945
- Rank: Vice Admiral
- Commands: Sōryū, Kaga, 25th Air Flotilla, Yokosuka Naval Air Group, 51st Air Flotilla, 101st Air Flotilla, 3rd Air Fleet
- Conflicts: World War II; Pacific War; New Guinea campaign; Operation Mo; Guadalcanal campaign; Solomon Islands campaign

Sadayoshi Yamada (山田 定義, Yamada Sadayoshi; 26 November 1892 – 16 November 1971) was a vice admiral in the Imperial Japanese Navy during World War II.

== Biography ==
=== Early career ===
Yamada was born in Fukuoka prefecture as the eldest son of Yamada Sadanao, a colonel in the Imperial Japanese Army, and was raised in Matsue, Shimane. He graduated from the 42nd class of the Imperial Japanese Naval Academy in 1914, ranked 5th out of 117 cadets. As a midshipman, he was assigned to the cruisers Aso and Yakumo, and on his commissioning as ensign was assigned to the battleships Kawachi and Asahi. In May 1918, he attended the Naval Artillery School; however in December 1918 he transferred to the fledgling naval aviation section. He was assigned to a fighter squadron in Yokosuka Naval Air Group from December 1919, where he rose to become a flight commander.

As a lieutenant, Yamada was posted as naval attaché to France from August 1920 to December 1923, and was a member of the Japanese delegation at the Versailles Peace Treaty negotiations and while in France was promoted to captain. On his return to Japan, he was assigned as squadron commander at Yokosuka from June 1924 and as an instructor at the Kasumigaura Air Group from December 1925. He was promoted to lieutenant commander in 1925, and then to commander after graduation from the Naval Staff College in December 1928.

As commander, Yamada served as chief-of-staff of Section 1 (Operations) and Section 2 (Weapons) within the Imperial Japanese Navy General Staff from December 1930, and Section 3 (Intelligence) from May 1931. He was again sent as naval attaché to France from June 1935 to March 1938, during which he participated in the Geneva Disarmament Conference. He was also promoted to captain while in France in 1935. After his return to Japan, he was subjected to an extensive debriefing by the General Staff and was then assigned to the staff of the Yokosuka Naval District from May 1939.

In October 1939, Yamada assumed command of the aircraft carrier Sōryū and October 1940 was reassigned to the Kaga. He was promoted to rear admiral on 15 October 1941.

=== World War II ===
After the start of the Pacific War, Yamada was assigned command of the 25th Air Flotilla (also called the "5th Air Attack Force") at the Japanese base of Rabaul, New Britain from April 1942. This aircraft wing consisted of land-based bombers, fighters, and reconnaissance aircraft, and reported to the 11th Air Fleet. Its role was to support Japanese military operations in the New Guinea and Solomon Islands Campaigns, including Operation Mo, the attempted invasion of Port Moresby in May, 1942. Yamada was transferred from November 1942 to December 1943 to serve as Chief of Staff for the 3rd Fleet. From December 1943 to March 1944, he commanded the Yokosuka Air Group. He was promoted to vice admiral on 15 October 1944. He commanded the 101st Squadron from November 1944 to August 1945, and the 3rd Air Fleet from 26 August to 15 October 1945.

He died in 1971.
