= Takahide Aioi =

Imperial Japanese Navy flying ace of World War II

- 相生 高秀
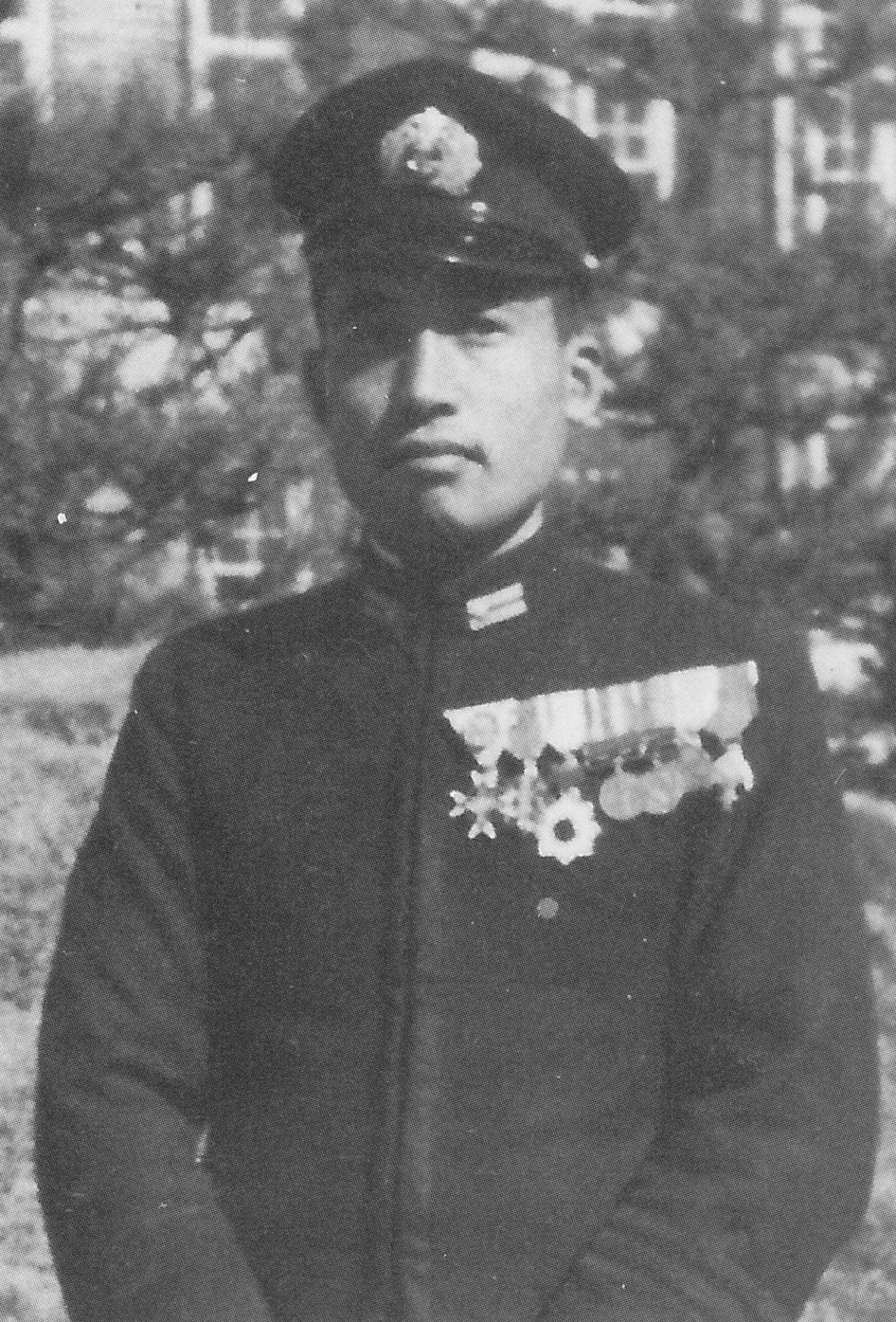
- Aioi while with the Ōita Air Group in 1940 or 1941
- Born: January 4, 1912; Hiroshima, Japan
- Died: March 6, 1993 (aged 81)
- Military career
- Allegiance: Empire of Japan; Japan
- Branch: Imperial Japanese Navy; Japan Maritime Self-Defense Force
- Service years: 1933-1945; July 1, 1967
- Rank: IJN: Commander; JMSDF: Vice admiral
- Units: Ryūjō, 202nd Air Group, Zuikaku, 343rd Air Group
- Commands: 343rd Air Group; Japan Maritime Self-Defense Force
- Conflicts: Second Sino-Japanese War; World War II; Pacific War; Philippines campaign (1941–1942); Solomon Islands campaign; Battle of Leyte Gulf
- Awards: Order of the Rising Sun, 3rd class Order of the Sacred Treasure, 4th class Order of the Golden Kite, 5th class

Vice Admiral Takahide Aioi (相生 高秀, Aioi Takahide; January 4, 1912 – March 6, 1993) was an Imperial Japanese Navy Air Service flying ace during the Second Sino-Japanese War and World War II, and later commander of the Japan Maritime Self-Defense Force. In aerial combat over China and the Pacific, he was officially credited with destroying 10 enemy aircraft.

During the Pacific theater of World War II, Aioi participated in the conquest of the Philippines as a pilot aboard the aircraft carrier Ryūjō. Later, he served as group leader in the 202nd Air Group during the Solomon Islands campaign. Aioi participated in the Battle of Leyte Gulf aboard the carrier Zuikaku in 1944. He ended the war as executive officer of the 343rd Air Group in Japan.

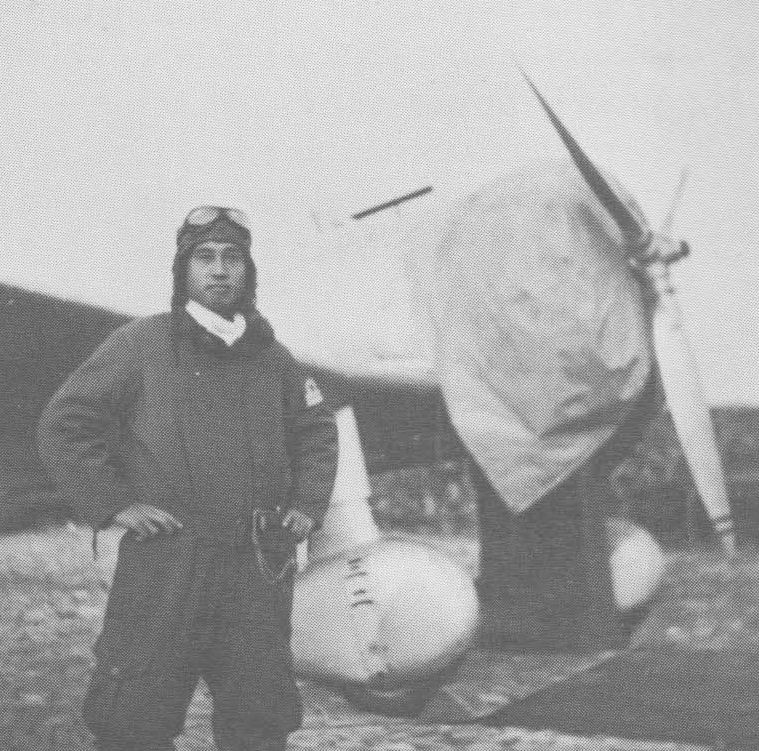
Aioi at Hankou, China, in 1938 while with the 12th Air Group

In 1954, Aioi joined the JMSDF, eventually rising to the rank of vice admiral.
