= 25th Air Flotilla =

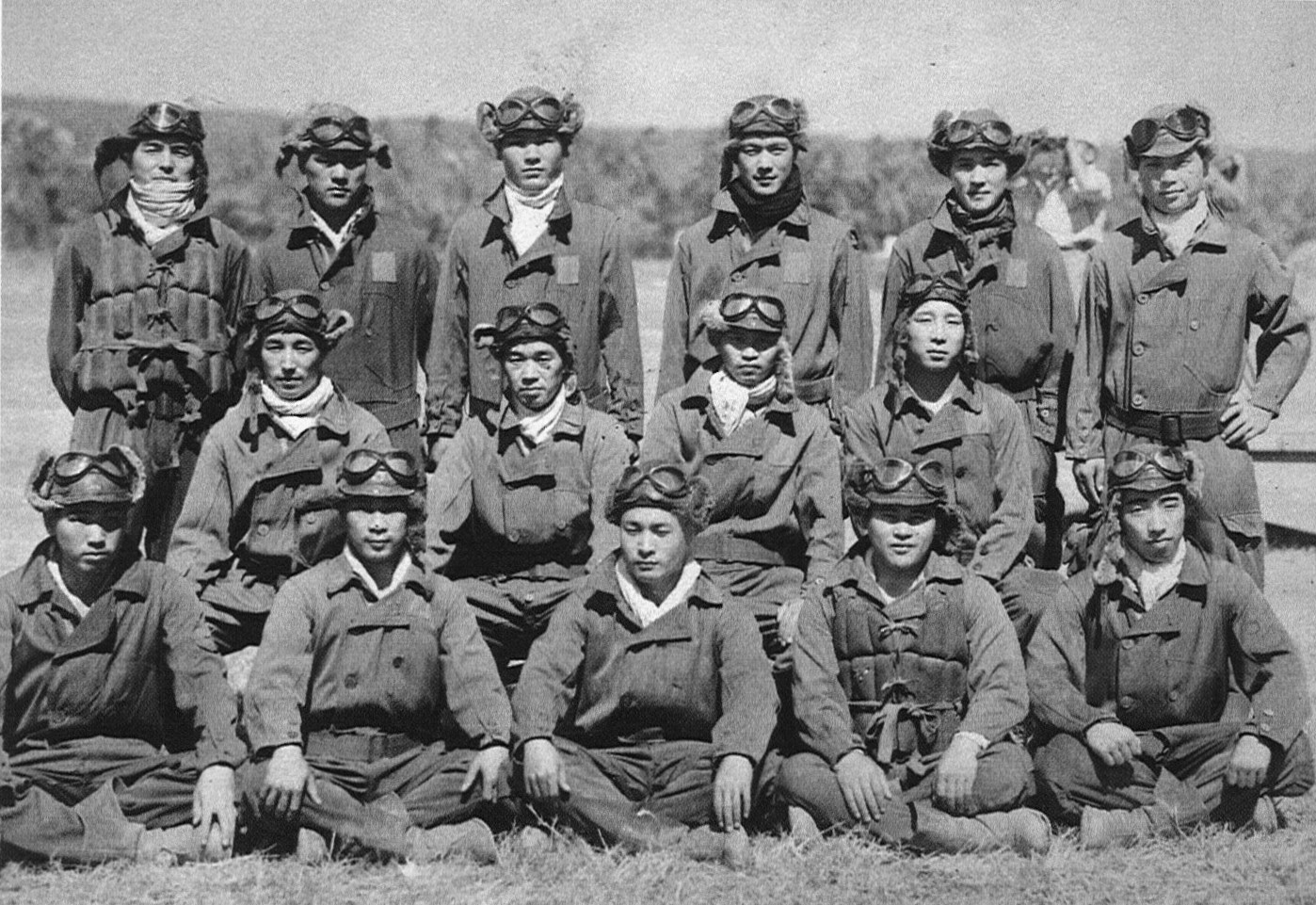
- Enlisted fighter pilots of the Tainan Air Group, part of the 25th Air Flotilla, pose at Lae in 1942. Several of these aviators would be among the top Japanese Naval aces, including Saburō Sakai (middle row, second from left), and Hiroyoshi Nishizawa (standing, first on left).
- Active: 1 April 1942 – 5 May 1944; 10 July 1944 - 10 February 1945
- Country: Empire of Japan
- Allegiance: Empire of Japan
- Branch: (Empire of Japan) Imperial Japanese Navy
- Type: Naval aviation unit
- Role: Bomber, Fighter, Reconnaissance
- Part of: 11th Air Fleet
- Garrison/HQ: Rabaul, New Britain; Lae, Buka, and Buin, Papua New Guinea, and Shortland Islands and Tulagi, Solomon Islands
- Engagements: New Guinea Campaign; Solomon Islands Campaign

Commanders
- Notable commanders: Sadayoshi Yamada

The 25th Air Flotilla (第二五航空戦隊,, Dai Nijūgo Kōkū Sentai, "Nijūgo Kōsen") was a combat aviation unit of the Imperial Japanese Navy Air Service (IJNAS) during the Pacific Campaign of World War II.

== History ==
The 25th Air Flotilla, mainly consisting of land-based bombers, fighters, and reconnaissance aircraft, reported to the 11th Air Fleet. As originally organized, the flotilla's core units were the 4th Air Group, Tainan Air Group, and Yokohama Air Group. The 4th flew bombers, the Tainan fighters, and the Yokohama reconnaissance aircraft. The flotilla, under the command of Rear Admiral Sadayoshi Yamada, was deployed to Rabaul, New Britain on 29 March 1942. From this location, the unit supported Japanese military operations in the New Guinea and Solomon Islands Campaigns. During these campaigns, the unit was augmented by aircraft from other flotillas (i.e., 2nd Air Group and 3rd Air Group). The operational title for this hybrid organization was the 5th Air Attack Force. The organization took heavy losses in air combat over Guadalcanal.

== Organization ==
Date	Higher unit	Aviation units and vessels
1 April 1942 (original)	11th Air Fleet	4th Air Group (Note: Attack bomber unit. Renamed 702nd Air Group on 1 November 1942.), Tainan Air Group (Note: Fighter unit. Renamed 251st Air Group on 1 November 1942.), Yokohama Air Group (Note: Flying boat unit. Renamed 801st Air Group on 1 November 1942.), MV Mogamigawa Maru
29 April 1942	11th Air Fleet	4th Air Group, Tainan Air Group, Yokohama Air Group, Seaplane tender Akitsushima, MV Mogamigawa Maru
7 August 1942	11th Air Fleet	4th Air Group, Tainan Air Group, 2nd Air Group, Yokohama Air Group (detachment), 14th Air Group (detachment)
12 September 1942	11th Air Fleet	4th Air Group, Tainan Air Group, 2nd Air Group, Toko Air Group, Yokohama Air Group (detachment)
10 October 1942	11th Air Fleet	Tainan Air Group, 2nd Air Group, 3rd Air Group (detachment), 751st Air Group (ex-Kanoya fighter unit), Toko Air Group, 14th Air Group (detachment)
1 November 1942	11th Air Fleet	251st Air Group, 702nd Air Group, 801st Air Group
18 May 1943	11th Air Fleet	251st Air Group, 702nd Air Group
1 July 1943	11th Air Fleet	251st Air Group, 501st Air Group (Note: Combined fighter- and dive bomber unit.), 702nd Air Group
1 September 1943	11th Air Fleet	251st Air Group, 253rd Air Group (Note: Fighter unit.), 702nd Air Group, 705th Air Group (Note: Attack bomber unit. Before the Misawa Air Group, until 31 October 1942.), 751st Air Group (Note: Attack bomber unit. Before the Kanoya Air Group, until 31 October 1942.)
1 December 1943	11th Air Fleet	251st Air Group, 253rd Air Group, 751st Air Group
1 February 1944	11th Air Fleet	251st Air Group, 582nd Air Group (Note: Dive bomber unit. Before the 2nd Air Group, until 31 October 1942.), 751st Air Group
5 May 1944	dissolved	
10 July 1944	2nd Air Fleet	Nansei-Shotō Air Group (Note: Air base guards unit.)
15 November 1944	2nd Air Fleet	203rd Air Group (Note: Fighter unit. Before that known as the Atsugi Air Group, until 19 February 1944.), 701st Air Group (Note: Attack bomber unit. Before that known as the Toyohashi Air Group, until 19 February 1944.), Nansei-Shotō Air Group
15 December 1944	3rd Air Fleet	203rd Air Group, 701st Air Group
10 February 1945	dissolved	

== Commanding officers ==
	Rank	Name	Date	Note
1	Rear-Admiral	Sadayoshi Yamada	1 April 1942	
2	Rear-Admiral	Keizō Ueno	17 November 1942	
x		dissolved	5 May 1944	
3	Captain / Rear-Admiral	Tomozō Kikuchi	10 July 1944	Rear-Admiral on 15 October 1944.
4	Captain	Toshiyuki Yokoi	24 October 1944	
x		dissolved	10 February 1945	
