= Yokosuka Naval Air Group =

- 横須賀海軍航空隊
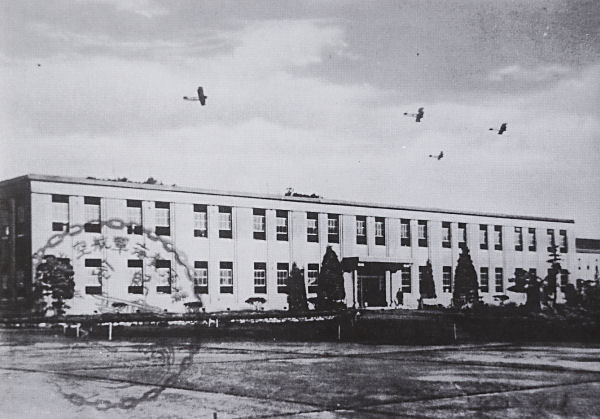
- Yokosuka Naval Air Group Headquarters, 1932
- Active: 1 April 1916 - 1945
- Country: Empire of Japan
- Branch: Imperial Japanese Navy
- Type: Military aviation
- Role: Test/Evaluation/Research/Combat
- Part of: Imperial Japanese Navy Air Service
- Garrison/HQ: Yokosuka Naval District
- Nickname: Yoko-Kū
- Engagements: Battle of Iwo Jima

The Yokosuka Naval Air Group (横須賀海軍航空隊, Yokosuka Kaigun Kōkū-tai) was the first aviation unit established by the Imperial Japanese Navy in 1916 and survived until the end of the Pacific War. Considered an elite unit composed of the best pilots in the Japanese navy, it was charged with educating and training aviation personnel, practical testing of new aircraft, and tactical research. In the event of an emergency, it was supposed to take charge of the defense of Tokyo Bay, and from February 1944, when the war situation demanded it, the unit was also involved in combat.

== History ==
The "Naval Aviation Research Committee", which was established in 1912, has laid the foundation for the Imperial Japanese Navy Air Service. With the start of domestic production of aircraft and training of crew members on track, the Air Corps Three Group Plan was established in 1916 in order to further improve aircraft. On 1 April 1916 the Yokosuka Naval Air Group was formed in Oppama, Yokosuka, Kanagawa Prefecture to replace the "Naval Aviation Research Committee".

On 1 September 1923 the Great Kanto Earthquake caused great damage to facilities and equipment. On 1 June 1930 the first class of naval flight reserve trainees joined the service, and after that preparatory training was conducted in Yokosuka until 1945. Around 1932 Minoru Genda who worked as instructor at Yokosuka created an aerobatic squadron called "Genda Circus" which served to increase the public appeal of the Navy Air Service.

Once the Pacific War started on 8 December 1941 the unit continued its training and testing role. From February 1944 the unit was ordered to be deployed in combat. On 15 June 1944, with the launch of Operation A-Go, it formed a part of the 27th Air Flotilla and Yawata Air Attack Unit and was deployed to Iwo Jima to support the Mariana Islands operations. Due to intensive air combat and enemy air raids on Iwo Jima, all aircraft had been lost by 4 July 1944. The remaining service members returned to Yokosuka by transport plane, but some stayed on Iwo Jima and lost their lives defending the island. Afterwards the unit was moved to Kyushu and engaged in kamikaze attacks and air defense battles in the Kantō area.

Its former site is currently occupied by the Nissan Oppama car manufacturing plant.

The Yokosuka Naval Air Group also maintained two detachments. One was the Detachment Sagamino, which was responsible for training maintenance personnel; the unit was upgraded to a Naval Air Group and renamed Sagamino Naval Air Group on November 1, 1942. Another one was the Detachment Ōita; because Oppama Airfield had become too cramped, several demonstration tests were conducted at Ōita Air Base.

== Commanding Officers and Commander of Yokosuka Naval Air Group ==
- C.O., Captain. Shirō Yamanouchi: April 1, 1916 – December 1, 1917
- C.O., Captain. Shōsaku Harada: December 1, 1917 – July 1, 1919
- C.O., Rear Admiral. Kiyokaze Yoshida : July 1, 1919 -December 1, 1919
- C.O., Rear Admiral. Shirō Yamanouchi: December 1, 1919 -November 12, 1920
- C.O., Captain. Yūji Tajiri: November 12, 1920 – November 1, 1922
- C.O., Captain./Rear Admiral. Shirō Furukawa: November 1, 1922 - December 1, 1923
- C.O., Captain. Shirō Inoue: December 1, 1923 – December 1, 1924
- C.O., Commander./Captain. Daijirō Ichikawa: December 1, 1924 – November 1, 1927
- C.O., Captain. Hideho Wada: November 1, 1927 – November 30, 1929
- C.O., Captain. Gorō Hara: November 30, 1929 – April 2, 1931
- C.O., Captain. Chūji Yamada: April 2, 1931 – November 15, 1932
- C.O., Captain./Rear Admiral. Jirō Ōnishi: November 15, 1932 - November 15, 1934
- C.O., Captain./Rear Admiral. Toshisuke Sugiyama: November 15, 1934 – December 1, 1936
- C.O., Captain. Teizō Mitsunami: December 1, 1936 – July 11, 1937
  - vacant post: July 11, 1937 - December 25, 1937
- C.O., Captain./Rear Admiral. Torao Kuwabara: December 25, 1937 – December 15, 1938
- C.O., Rear Admiral. Michitaro Tozuka: December 15, 1938 – October 20, 1939
  - vacant post: October 20, 1939 - January 15, 1940
- C.O., Rear Admiral. Torao Kuwabara: January 15, 1940 – November 15, 1940
- C.O., Captain./Rear Admiral. Keizō Uwano: November 15, 1940 – November 17, 1942
  - vacant post: November 17, 1942 - November 23, 1942
- C.O., Rear Admiral. Ryūnosuke Kusaka: November 23, 1942 – November 20, 1943
  - vacant post: November 20, 1943 - December 6, 1943
- C.O., Rear Admiral. Sadayoshi Yamada: December 6, 1943 – March 15, 1944
- Commander, Vice Admiral. Shun'ichi Kira: March 15, 1944 - July 10, 1944
- C.O., Rear Admiral. Katsuji Hattori: July 10, 1944 - September 29, 1944
- C.O., Captain./Rear Admiral. Tadao Katō: September 29, 1944 – March 20, 1945
- C.O., Rear Admiral. Chiaki Matsuda: March 20, 1945 - November 1, 1945

== Chief of staff of Yokosuka Naval Air Group ==
Yokosuka Naval Air Group appointed a chief of staff during the period when Shun'ichi Kira served as commander.

- Captain. Toshitane Takada: March 15, 1944 - April 7, 1944
- Captain. Kanzō Miura: April 7, 1944 - July 10, 1944

== Leader of Detachment Sagamino ==
- Captain (Engineering). Sakurō Morihiro: March 1, 1942 - October 10, 1942
- Captain (Engineering). Minoru Tanaka: October 10, 1942 - November 1, 1942

== Leader of Detachment Ōita ==
- Commander./Captain. Masaichi Kataoka: June 15, 1944 - January 25, 1945
  - vacant post: January 25, 1945 - February 14, 1945
- Commander. Kumao Okada: February 14, 1945 - April 5, 1945

== Bibliography ==
- 引頭文博「横須賀海軍航空隊の概況」『軍港と名勝史蹟』軍港と名勝史蹟発行所、1933年、pp.44-53。
- 『海軍飛行豫科練習生 第一巻』 国書刊行会、1983年。
- 海軍歴史保存会『日本海軍史』第9巻、第10巻、第一法規出版、1995年。
- 『官報』

== See also ==
- Oihama Naval Air Group -Separated from Yokosuka Naval Air Group to train maintenance personnel.
- List of air groups of the Imperial Japanese Navy
