= HMAS Maroubra =

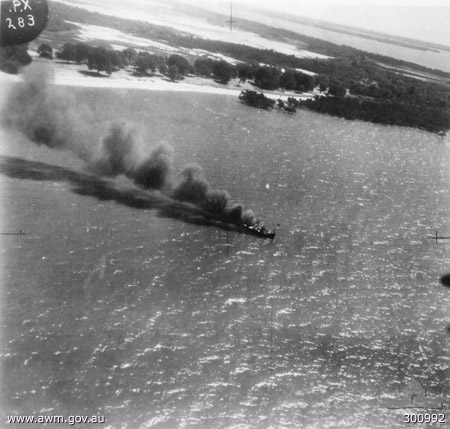
- Sinking of HMAS Maroubra

History

Australia
- Name: Maroubra
- Owner: Australian Petroleum Company Ltd
- Launched: 1930

Australia (RAN)
- Name: Maroubra
- Commissioned: 21 September 1942
- Fate: Sunk on 10 May 1943

HMAS Maroubra (FY.40/MR) was an auxiliary powered cutter that saw operation in both private use and also as a commissioned vessel for the Royal Australian Navy. The ship was built for Hayles Magnetic Island Pty Ltd of Townsville. Maroubra was the third vessel used by Hayles Magnetic Island Ltd in the shipping contract from Darwin to the Victoria and the Daly Rivers, and replaced Maree which, in turn replaced Magneta.

While on active service in May 1943 she was destroyed by Japanese forces.

== History ==
She was built for the Northern Territory coastal trade, and launched in 1930 by Norman Wright in Brisbane. She sailed from Townsville for Darwin in July 1930 via Cooktown and Thursday Island, where her skipper for the first leg, Captain R Hall handed her over to Captain Henry Lawson. Maroubra reached Darwin at 3 am on 25 July. Captain Lawson formerly of the State Shipping Service, reported very stormy weather outside much rougher than was usually expected at that time of the year. During the trip the future operator of the vessel, and family member Jack Hayles, crushed his fingers badly in attending to the engine, and had three fingers amputated, the accident was due to the unusually rough weather.

With the threat of war looming Maroubra was chartered by the Australian Petroleum Company Ltd in January 1938 to convey about 4,500 gallons of aviation fuel to bases established for the patrol boat Larrakia in Arnhem Land. The petrol was held in readiness at Golburn Islands, Mllingimbi, Elcho Island and Yirkalla.

Maroubra was the largest boat trading along the northern coast and was usually engaged chiefly in the transport of buffalo hides to Darwin from shooters camps on the banks of the larger rivers. No other boat in Darwin would hazard the long voyage to East Arnhem Land at that time of the year. At the same time she continued the work of supply and relief of police officers at their remote outposts.

=== Second World War ===
Maroubra was requisitioned for the RAN, from Australian Petroleum, on 20 March 1942. She was commissioned as HMAS Maroubra on the 21 September 1942 for military service as a patrol boat, auxiliary minesweeper, diving and stores transporter; operating between the ports of Cairns, Townsville, Thursday Island and Darwin.

However, while under naval control her duties did not change much, she still supplied the same remote outposts along with newly established military bases. On 10 May 1943 Maroubra was lying at Millingimbi in Arnhem Land when she was strafed by nine Imperial Japanese Navy Mitsubishi A6M Zero fighters on 10 May 1943. She caught fire and sank or drifted ashore.
