= Eastern Solomons order of battle =

Forces involved in 1942 battle of World War 2

IJ Combined Fleet and US Pacific Fleet Commanders

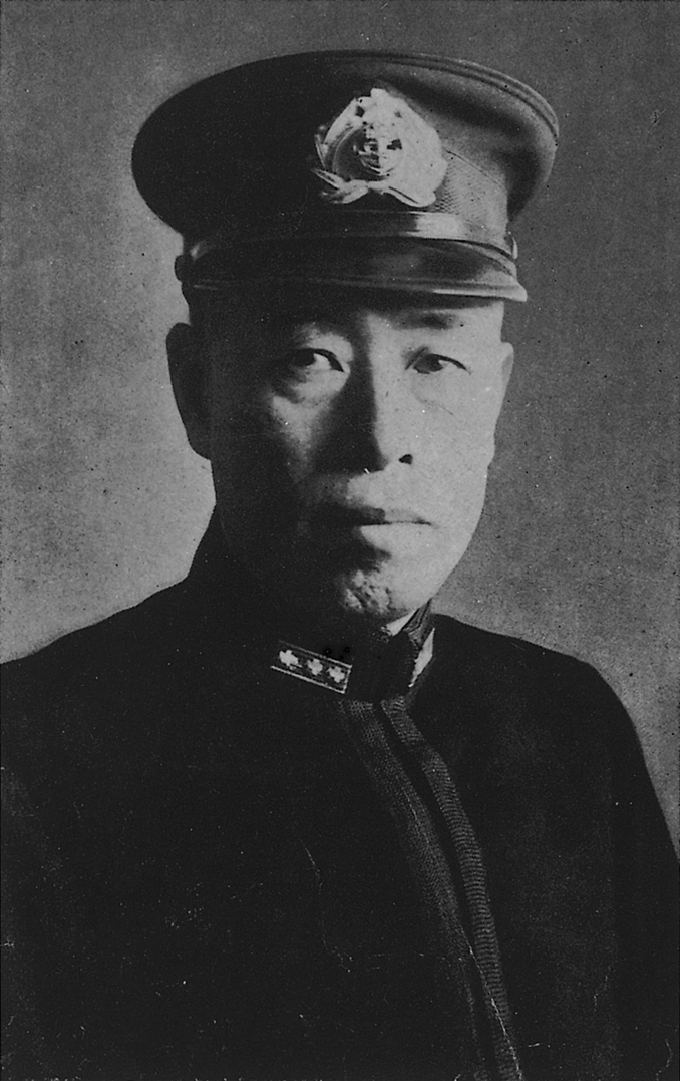
Adm. Isoroku Yamamoto (HQ at Tokyo)

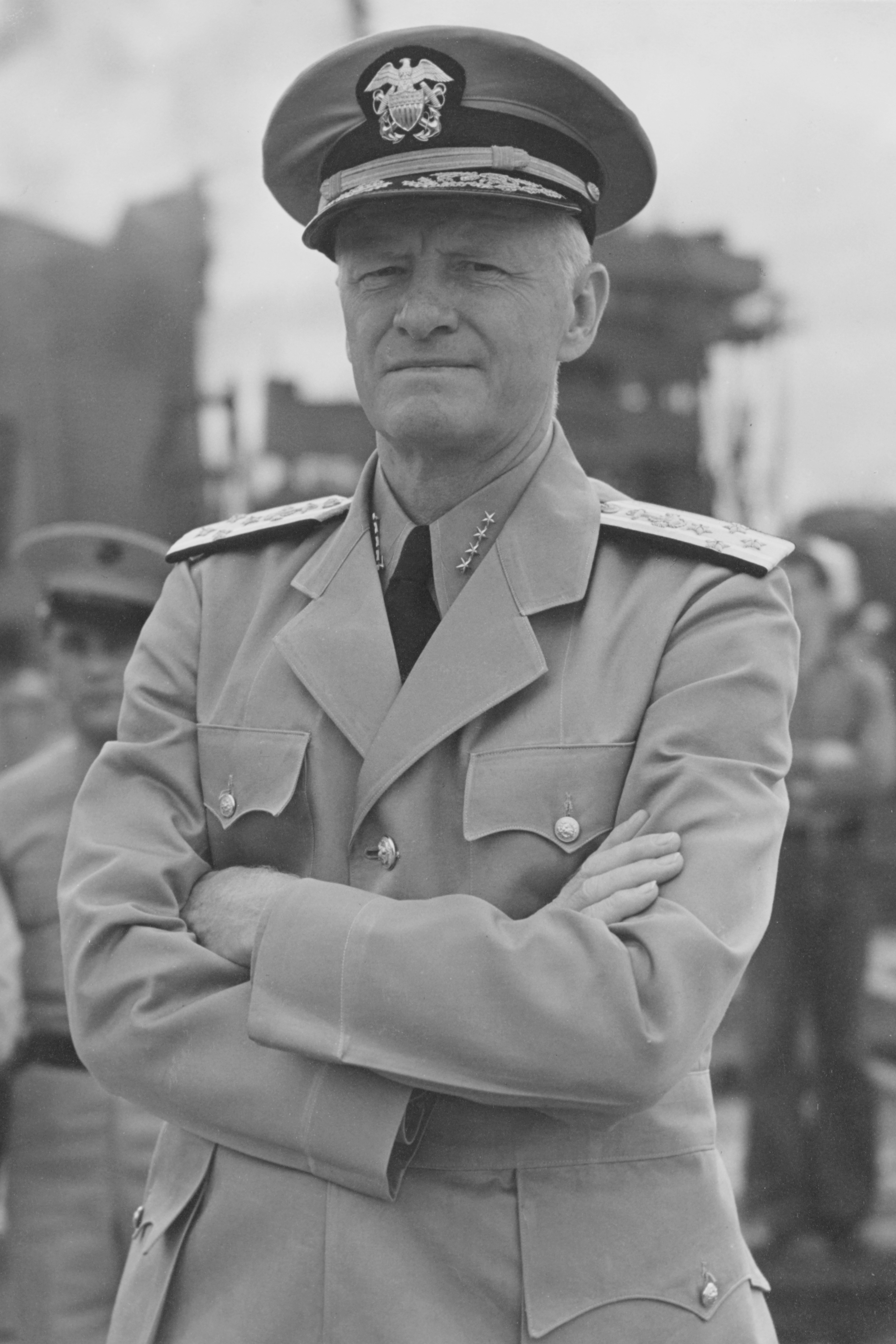
Adm. Chester W. Nimitz (HQ at Pearl Harbor)

The Battle of the Eastern Solomons was fought August 23–25, 1942 in the waters east and northeast of the Solomon Islands by forces of the Imperial Japanese Navy's Combined Fleet and the US Navy's Pacific Fleet. The battle resulted from a major effort by the Japanese to reinforce their troop strength on the island of Guadalcanal. The Japanese high command had realized this reinforcement was necessary following the annihilation of the Ichiki Detachment by the 1st Marines a few days earlier.

The battle can be counted both a tactical and strategic American victory: greater ship losses were inflicted on the Japanese, and the transports were turned back from their mission of landing reinforcements.

== Forces deployed ==
(Empire of Japan) Japanese forces

Combat ships: 2 fleet carriers, 1 light carrier, 3 old battleships, 13 heavy cruisers, 3 light cruisers, 30 destroyers, 2 1st-class submarines, 1 2nd-class submarine
Aircraft: 69 fighters, 41 dive bombers, 57 torpedo bombers

American forces

Combat ships: 3 fleet carriers, 1 fast battleship, 6 heavy cruisers, 1 light cruiser, 2 anti-aircraft light cruisers, 20 destroyers
Aircraft: 100 fighters, 54 dive bombers, 54 scout bombers, 45 torpedo bombers

Ship losses

IJN : 1 light carrier, 1 destroyer, 1 1st-class submarine
USN : none

== Japanese order of battle ==
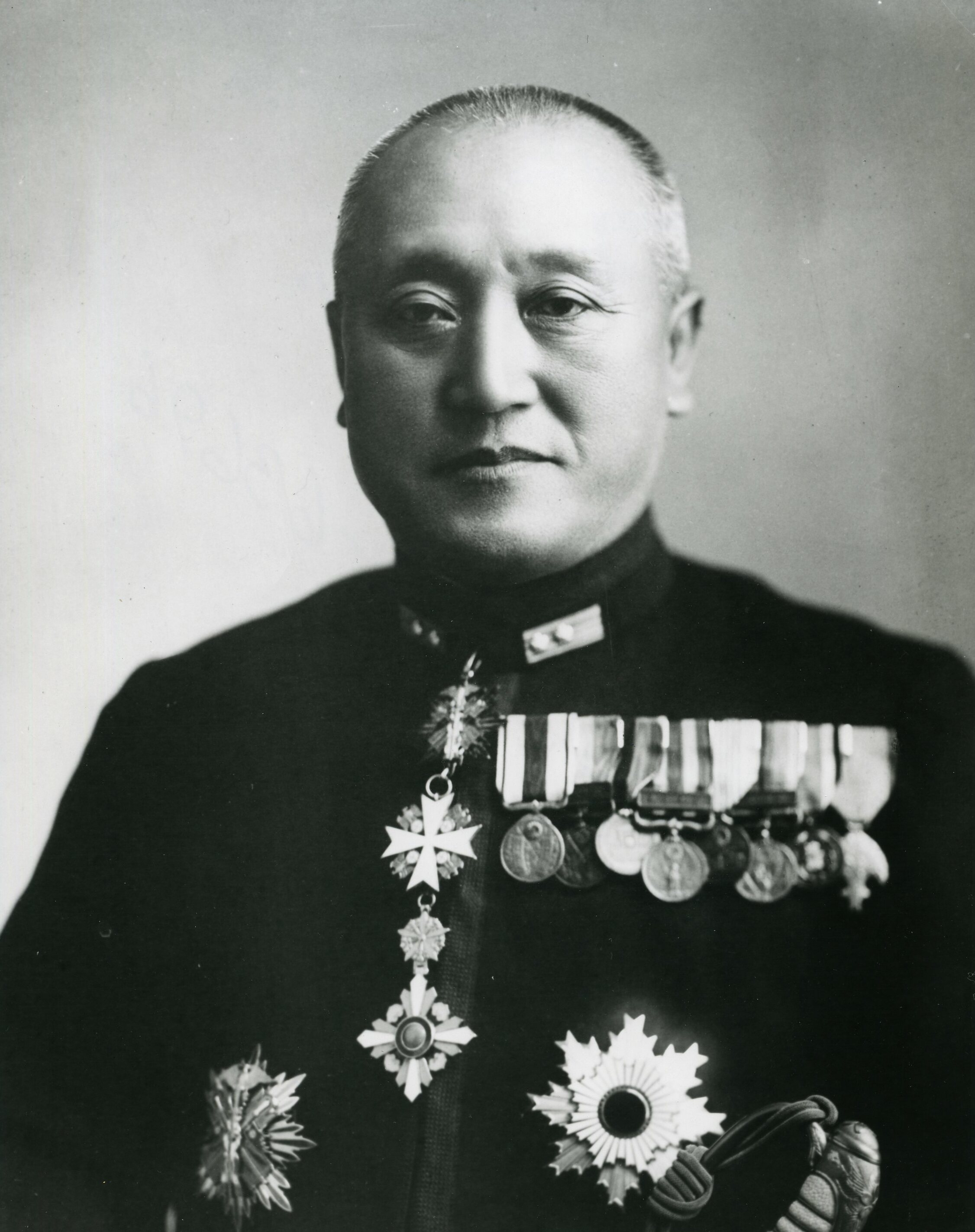
Vice Adm. Nobutake Kondo

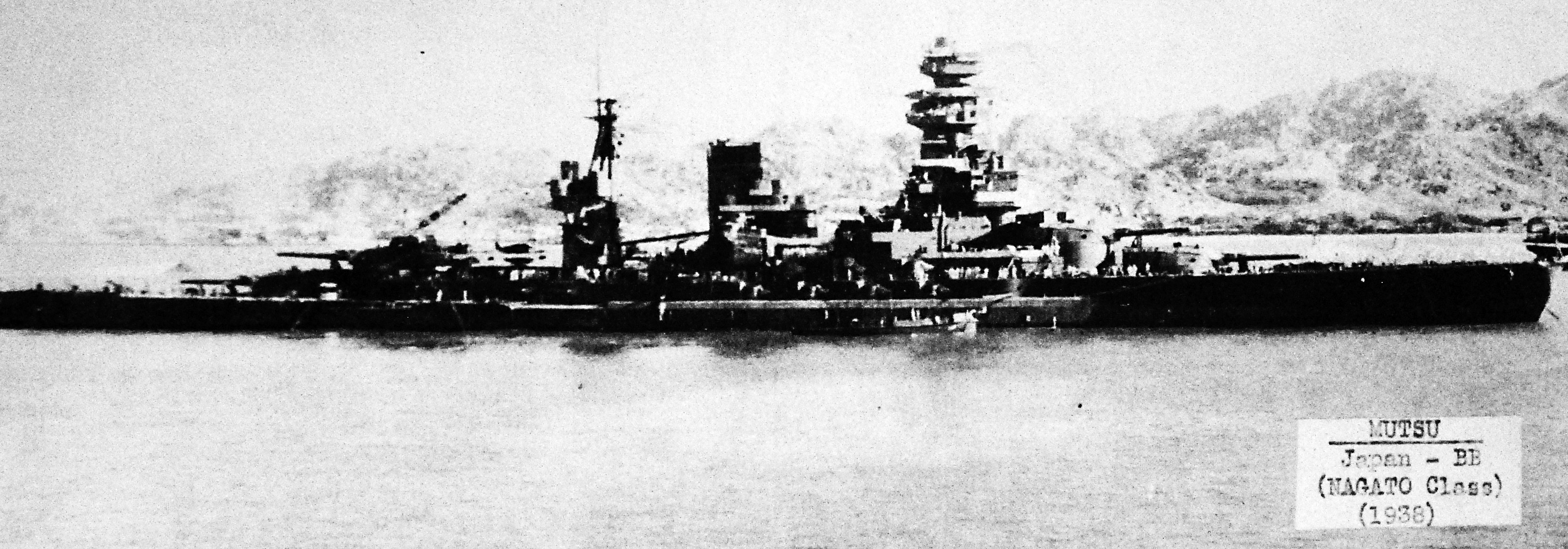
Battleship Mutsu before the war

=== Guadalcanal Supporting Forces ===
Vice Admiral Nobutake Kondo in heavy cruiser Atago

Advanced Force
Vice Admiral Kondo

Main Body

Cruiser Division 4

3 Takao-class heavy cruisers (10 × 8-in. main battery): (Note: Each ship also carried 3 scout planes.) Atago, Maya, Takao

Cruiser Division 5 (Vice Adm. Takeo Takagi)

2 Myoko-class heavy cruisers (10 × 8-in. main battery): (Note: Each ship also carried 2 scout planes.) Myoko, Haguro

Destroyer Squadron 4 (Rear Adm. Tamotsu Takama):

1 Nagara-class light cruiser (7 × 5.5-in. main battery): Yura
2 Asashio-class destroyers (6 × 5-in. main battery): Asagumo, Yamagumo
3 Kagero-class destroyers (6 × 5-in. main battery): Kuroshio, Oyashio, Hayashio

Support Group

1 Nagato-class battleship (8 × 16-in. main battery): (Note: Ship also carried 3 scout planes.) Mutsu
3 Shiratsuyu-class destroyers (5 × 5-in. main battery): Murasame, Harusame, Samidare

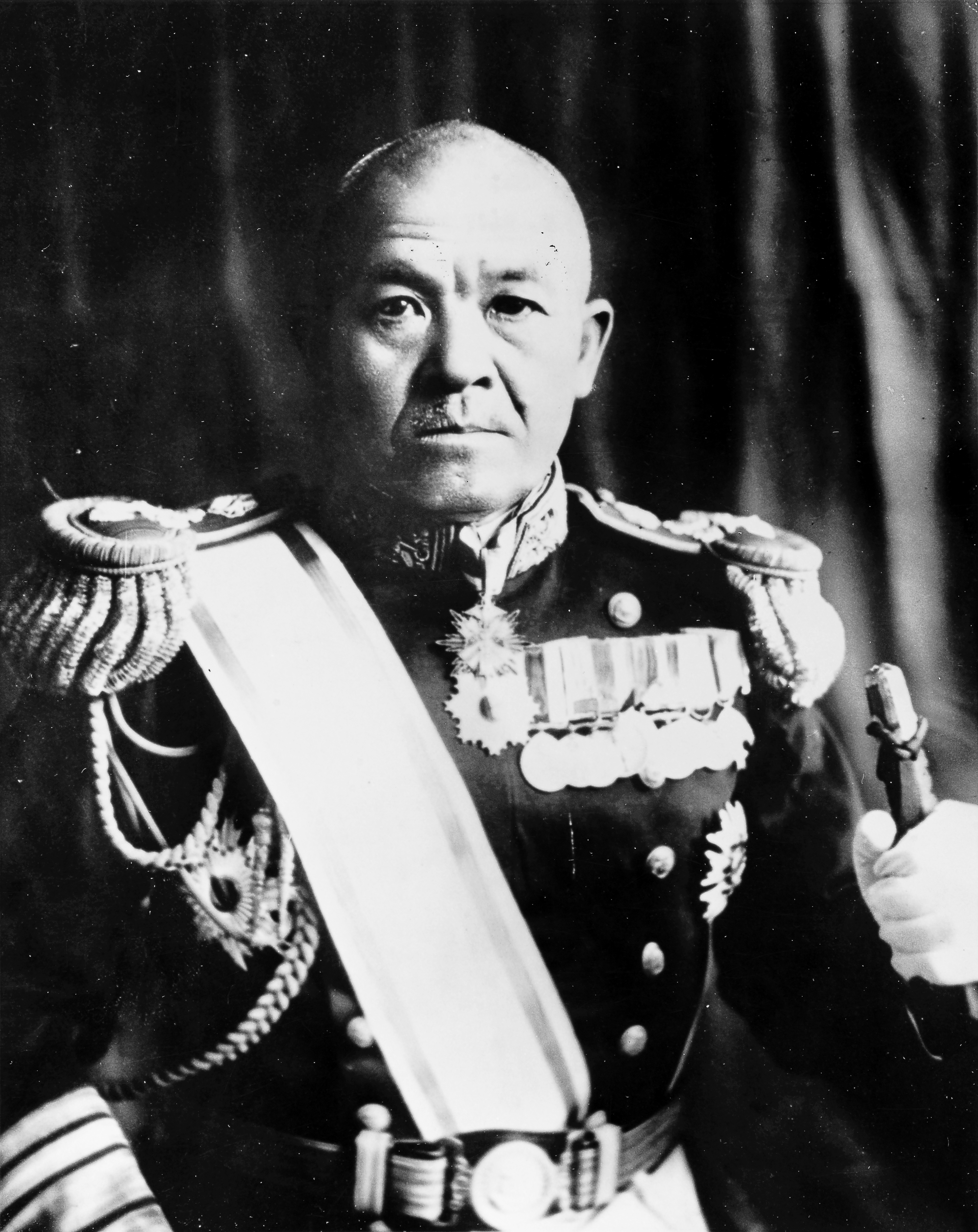
Vice Adm. Chuichi Nagumo

Early-war Japanese naval aircraft

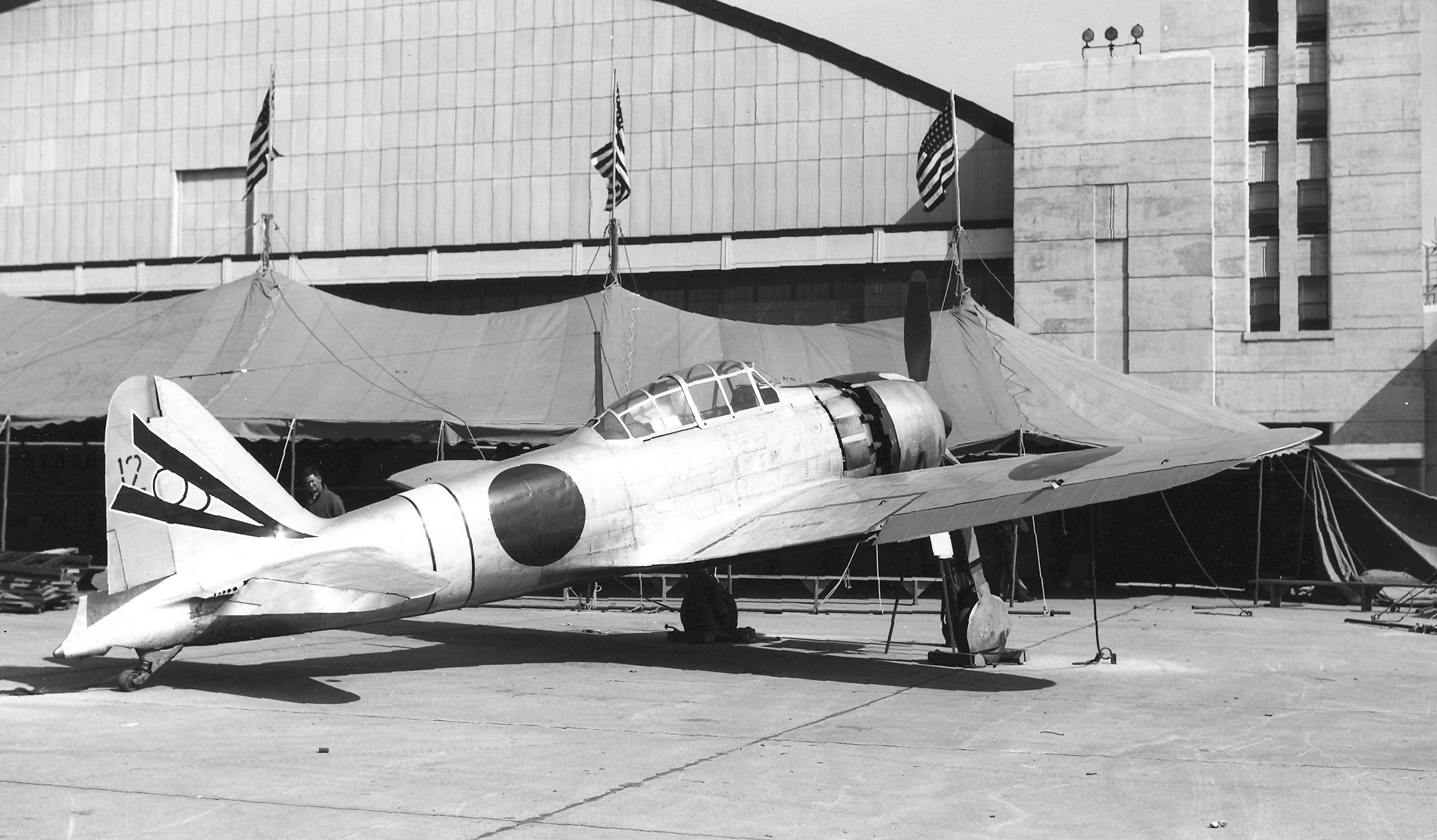
Mitsubishi A6M "Zeke" fighter

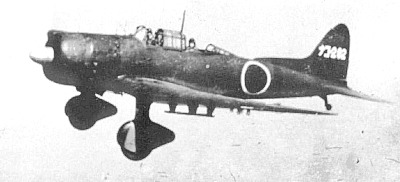
Aichi D3A "Val" dive bomber

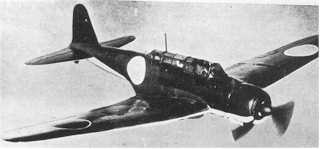
Nakajima B5N "Kate" torpedo bomber

Striking Force
Vice Admiral Chuichi Nagumo in fleet carrier Shokaku

Carrier Group
Vice Admiral Nagumo

2 Shōkaku-class fleet carriers

Shōkaku (Capt. Masafumi Arima)

27 Mitsubishi A6M "Zeke" fighters (Lt. Hideki Shingo)
27 Aichi D3A "Val" dive bombers (Lt. Cdr. Mamoru Seki)
18 Nakajima B5N "Kate" torpedo bombers (Lt. Cdr. Shigeharu Murata)

Zuikaku (Capt. Tameteru Notomo)

27 Mitsubishi A6M "Zeke" fighters (Lt. Ayao Shirane)
27 Aichi D3A "Val" dive bombers (Lt. Sadamu Takahashi)
18 Nakajima B5N "Kate" torpedo bombers (Lt. Shigeichirō Imajuku)

Screen

1 Kagero-class (6 × 5-in. main battery): Akigumo
3 Yugumo-class (6 × 5-in. main battery): Yugumo, Makigumo, Kazegumo
2 Fubuki-class (6 × 5-in. main battery): Shikinami, Uranami

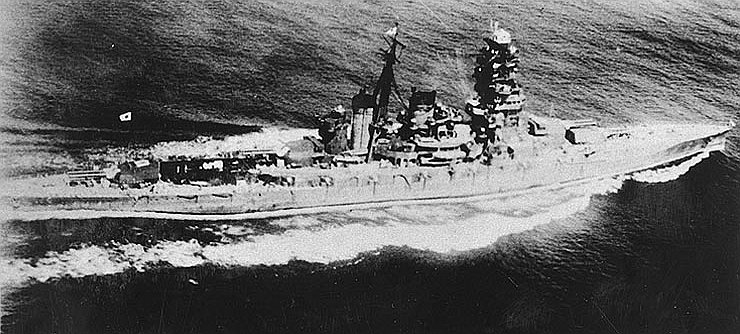
Battleship Hiei

Vanguard Group
Rear Admiral Hiroaki Abe

Battleships

2 Kongo-class fast battleships (8 × 14-in. main battery): (Note: Each ship also carried 2 scout planes.) Hiei, Kirishima

Cruiser Division 7 (Rear Adm. Shoji Nishimura)

2 Mogami-class (10 × 8-in. main battery): (Note: Each ship also carried 3 scout planes.) Kumano, Suzuya
1 Tone-class (8 × 8-in. main battery): (Note: Ship also carried 6 scout planes.) Chikuma

Destroyer Squadron 10 (Rear Admiral Susumu Kimura)

1 Nagara-class light cruiser (7 × 5.5-in. main battery): Nagara
1 Akizuki-class destroyer (8 × 4-in. main battery): Akizuki
5 Kagero-class destroyer (6 × 5-in. main battery): Hatsukaze, Maikaze, Nowaki, Tanikaze, Yukikaze

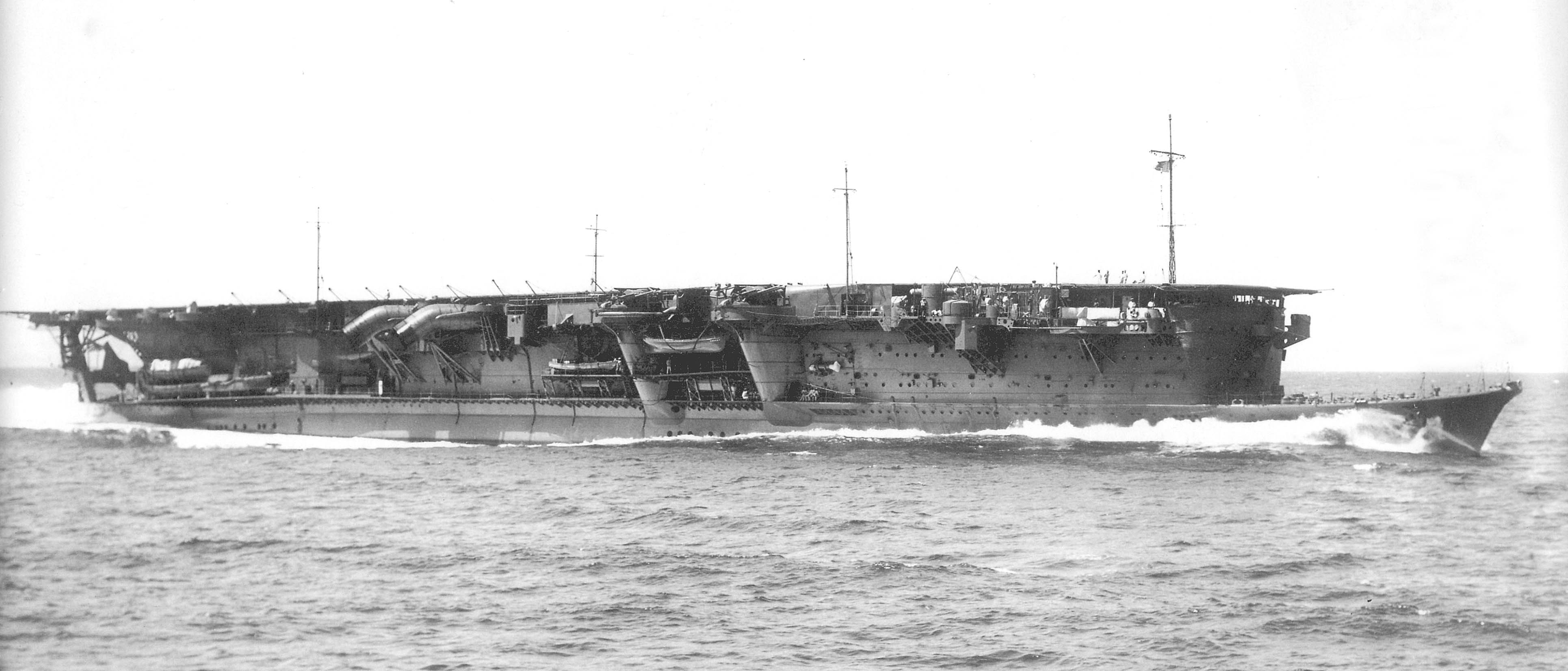
Light carrier Ryūjō

Diversionary Group
Rear Admiral Chūichi Hara in heavy cruiser Tone

1 light carrier: Ryujo (Capt. Tadao Katō) (sunk)

24 Mitsubishi A6M "Zeke" fighters (Lt. Kenjirō Nōtomi)
9 Nakajima B5N "Kate" torpedo bombers (Lt. Binichi Murakami)

1 Tone-class heavy cruiser (8 × 8-in. main battery): (Note: Ship also carried 6 scout planes.) Tone
2 Kagero-class destroyers (6 × 5-in. main battery): Amatsukaze, Tokitsukaze

=== Southeast Area Forces ===
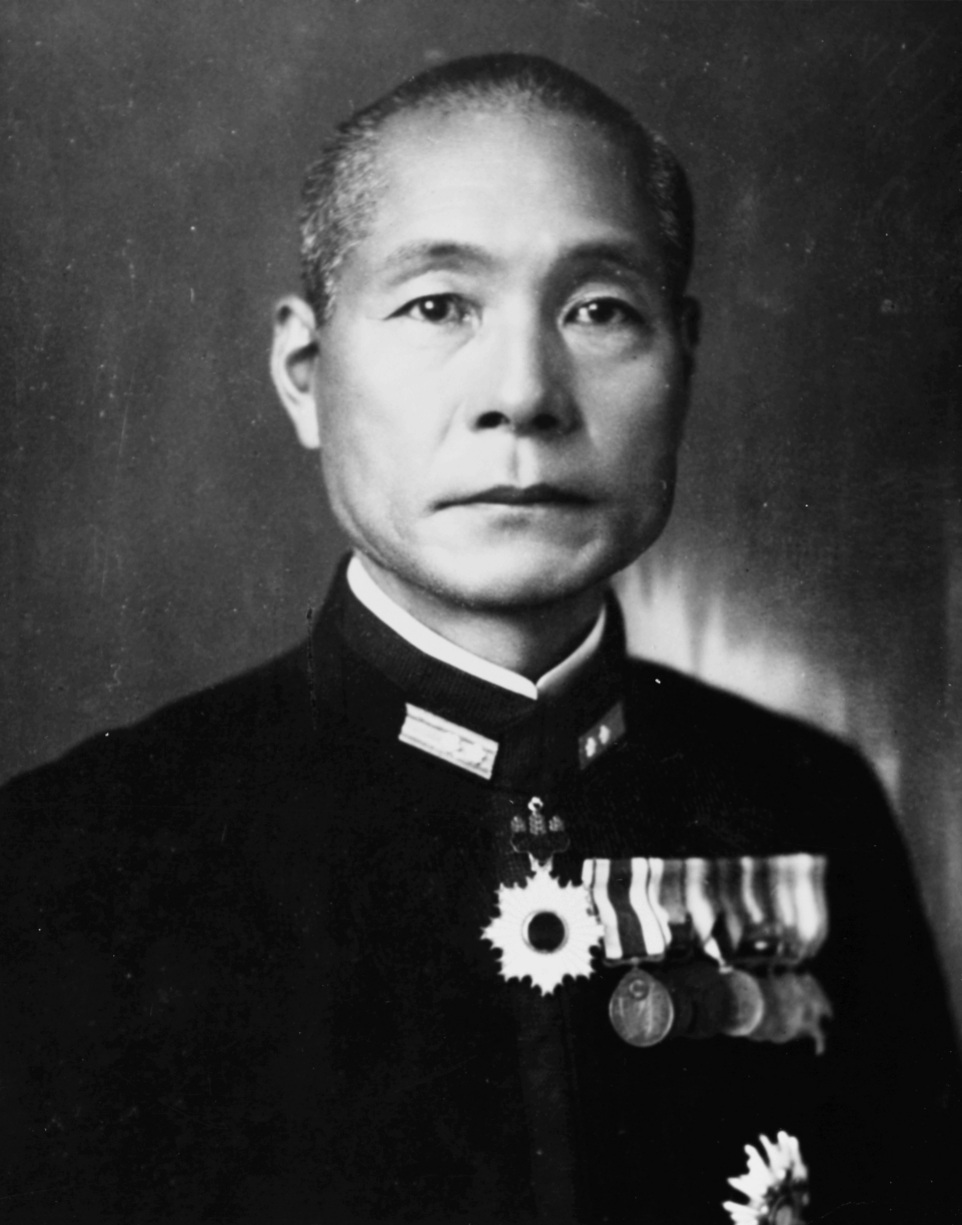
Vice Adm. Gunichi Mikawa

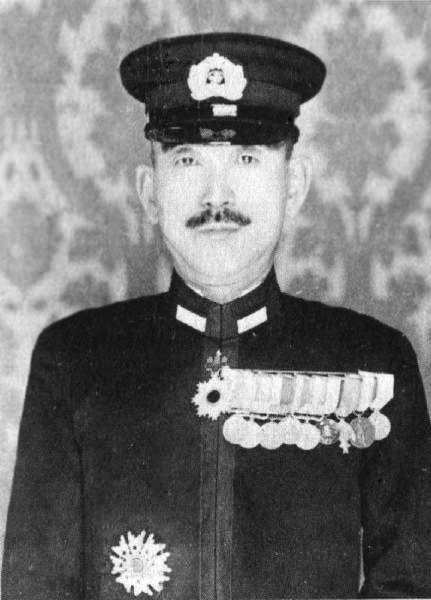
Rear Adm. Raizo Tanaka

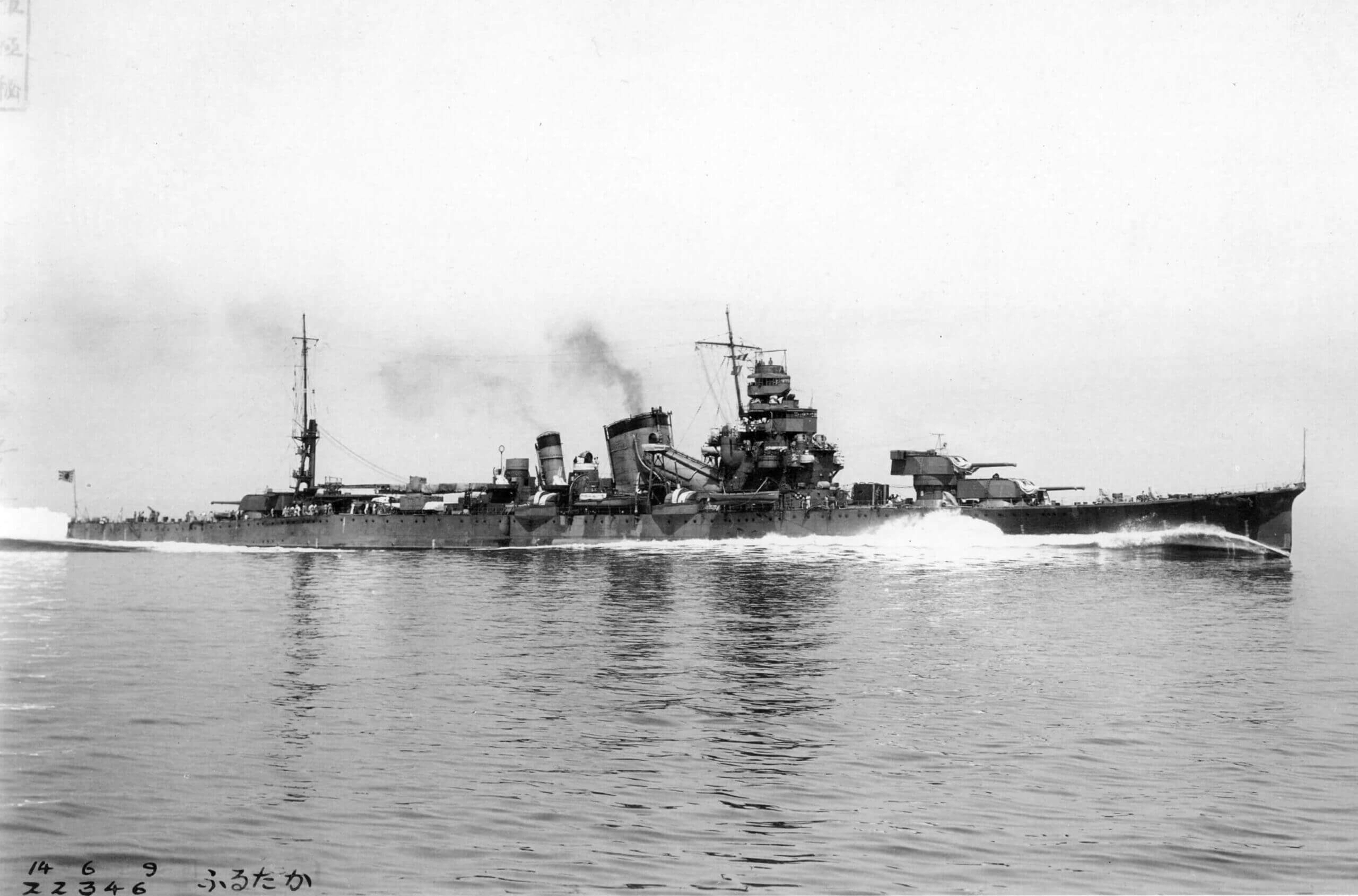
Heavy cruiser Furutaka

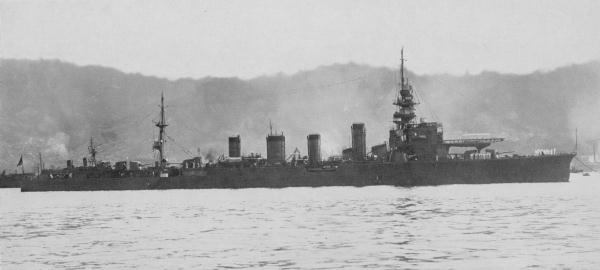
Light cruiser Jintsu

Vice Admiral Nishizo Tsukahara

Outer South Seas Force
Vice Admiral Gunichi Mikawa

Reinforcement Group
Rear Admiral Raizo Tanaka (Note: Departed Truk 16 August)

Transport Unit

1 auxiliary cruiser: Kinryu Maru

Embarking 800 men of the 5th Yokosuka SNLF

4 patrol boats: No. 1, No. 2, No. 34, No. 35

Embarking 700 men of the 2nd echelon of the IJA Ichiki Detachment

Escort Unit

1 Sendai-class light cruiser (7 × 5.5-in. main battery, 1 scout plane): Jintsu
2 Kagero-class destroyers (6 × 5-in. main battery): Kagero, Isokaze
3 Shiratsuyu-class destroyers (5 × 5-in. main battery): Kawakaze, Suzukaze, Umikaze
3 Mutsuki-class destroyers (4 × 4.7-in. main battery): Mutsuki (sunk), Yayoi, Uzuki

Covering Group
Vice Admiral Mikawa (Note: Departed Shortlands 23 August.)

1 Takao-class heavy cruiser: Chōkai
Cruiser Division 6 (Rear Adm. Aritomo Gotō)

2 Aoba-class heavy cruisers (6 × 8-in. main battery): (Note: Each ship also carried 2 scout planes.) Aoba, Kinugasa
1 Furutaka-class heavy cruiser (6 × 8-in. main battery): (Note: Ship also carried 2 scout planes.) Furutaka

Submarine Group

2 1st-class submarines: I-121, I-123 (sunk)
1 2nd-class submarine: Ro-34

== American order of battle ==
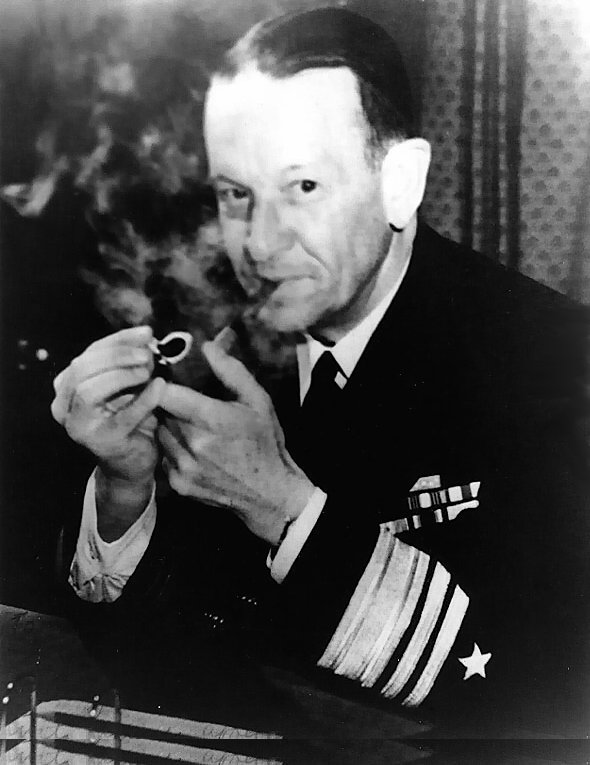
Vice Admiral Frank Jack Fletcher

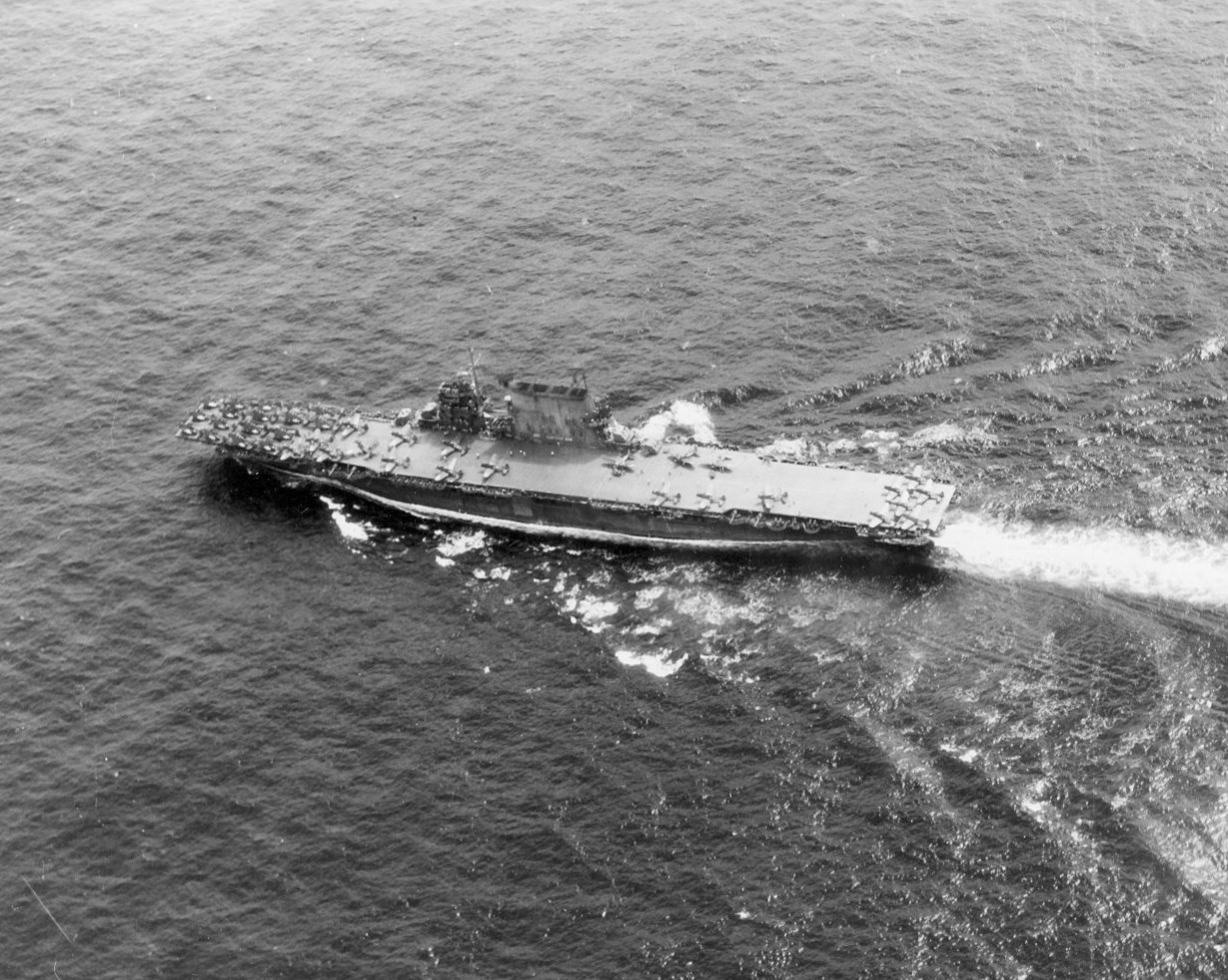
Saratoga underway in 1944.

=== Task Force 61 ===
Vice Admiral Frank Jack Fletcher in Saratoga

==== Task Force 11 ====
Vice Admiral Fletcher

1 Lexington-class fleet carrier

Saratoga (Capt. DeWitt C. Ramsey)

Air Group (Cmdr. Harry D. Felt)

VF-5: 27 F4F Wildcat fighters (Lt. Cmdr. Leroy C. Simpler)
VB-3: 17 SBD Dauntless dive bombers (Lt. Cmdr. Dewitt W. Shumway)
VS-3: 15 SBD Dauntless scout bombers (Lt. Cmdr. Louis J. Kirn)
VT-8: 13 TBF Avenger torpedo bombers (Lt. Harold H. Larsen)

Cruisers (Rear Adm. Carleton H. Wright)

2 New Orleans-class heavy cruisers (9 × 8-in./55-cal. main battery)

Minneapolis (Capt. Frank J. Lowry)
New Orleans (Capt. Walter S. DeLany)

1 County-class heavy cruiser (8 × 8-in. main battery)

HMAS Australia (Capt. Harold Farncomb, RAN)

1 Leander-class light cruiser (8 × 6-in. main battery)

HMAS Hobart (Capt. Henry Showers, RAN)

Screen (Capt. Samuel B. Brewer)

7 destroyers

1 Porter-class (8 × 5-in./38 SP/low elevation main battery): Phelps
4 Farragut-class (4 × 5-in./38 DP main battery): Farragut, MacDonough, Worden, Dewey
2 Bagley-class (4 × 5-in./38 DP main battery): Bagley, Patterson

==== Task Force 16 ====
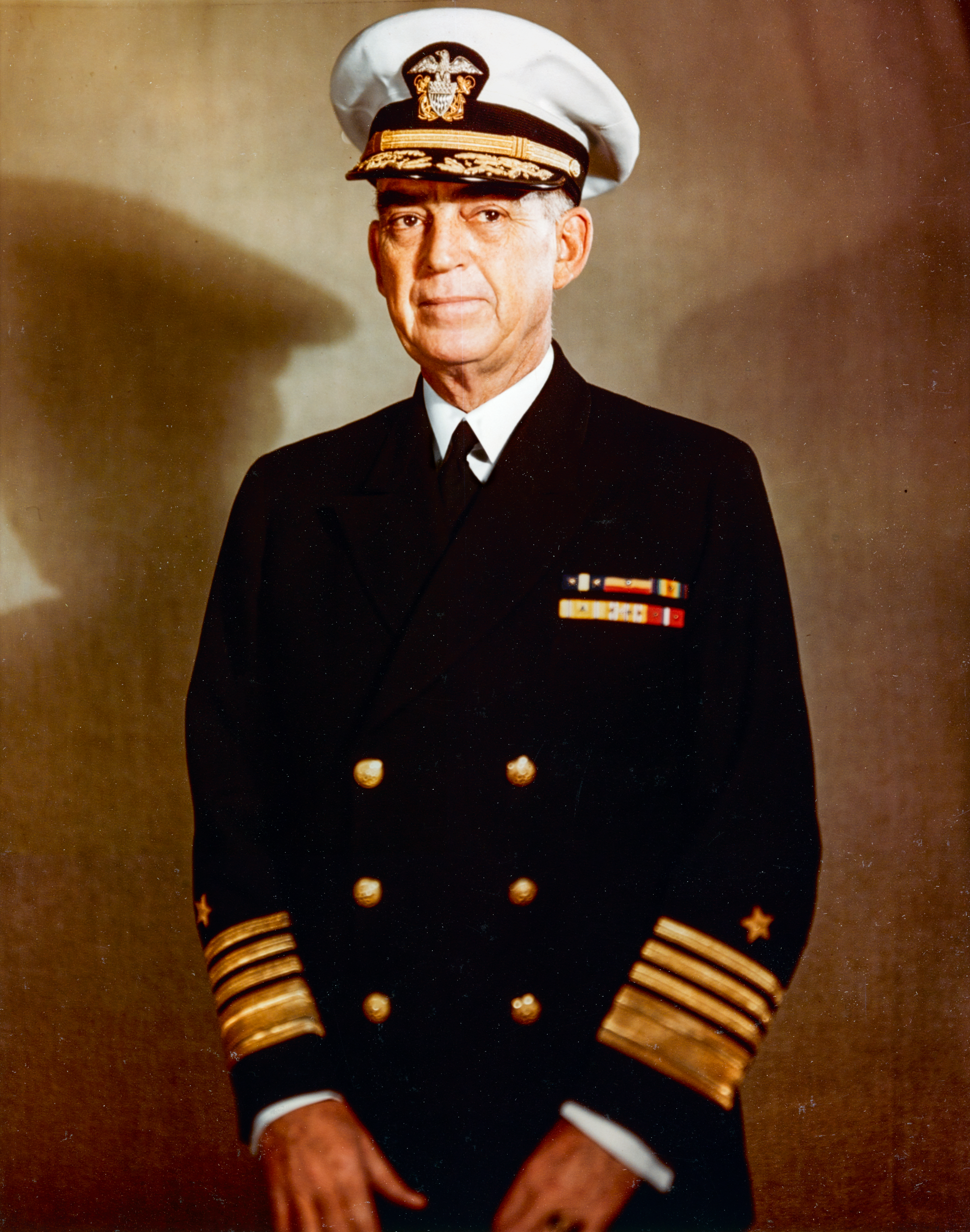
Thomas C. Kinkaid as a vice admiral and commander of US Seventh Fleet

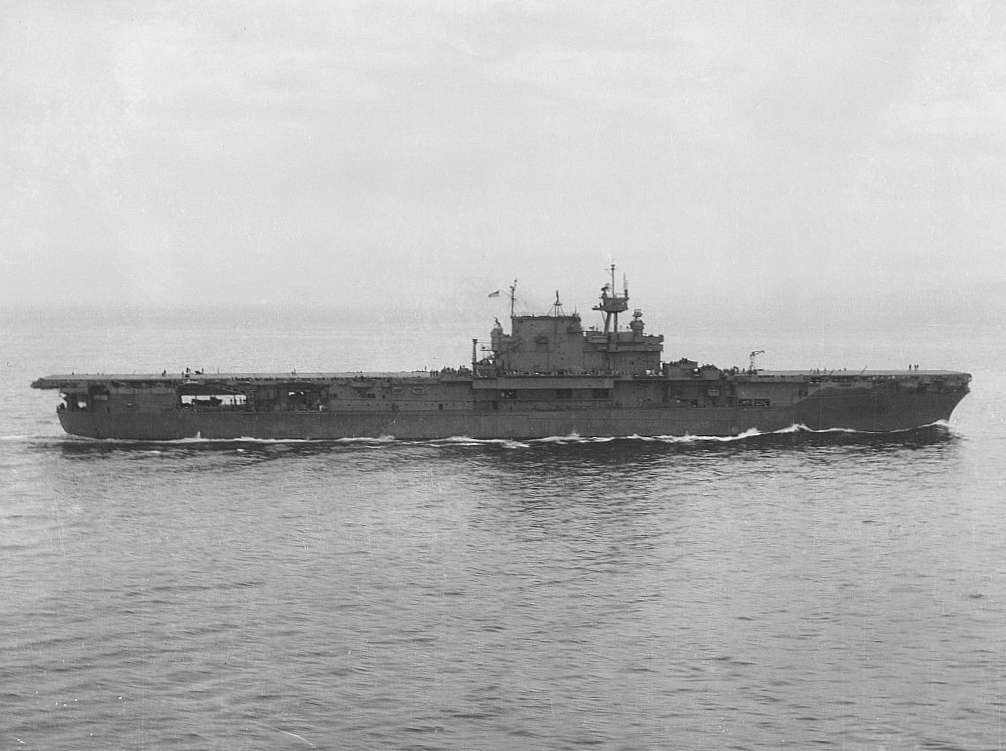
Enterprise underway.

Rear Admiral Thomas C. Kinkaid in Enterprise

1 Yorktown-class fleet carrier

Enterprise (Capt. Arthur C. Davis)

Air Group (Lt. Cmdr. Maxwell F. Leslie)

VF-6: 29 F4F Wildcat fighters (Lt. Louis H. Bauer)
VB-6: 17 SBD Dauntless dive bombers (Lt. Ray Davis)
VS-5: 18 SBD Dauntless scout bombers (Lt. Turner F. Caldwell)
VT-3: 15 TBF Avenger torpedo bombers (Lt. Cmdr. Charles M. Jett)

Battleship and Cruisers (Rear Adm. Mahlon S. Tisdale)

1 North Carolina-class fast battleship (9 × 16-in./45-cal. main battery)

North Carolina (Capt. George H. Fort)

1 Portland-class heavy cruiser (9 × 8-in./55-cal. main battery)

Portland (Capt. Laurance T. DuBose)

1 Atlanta-class anti-aircraft light cruiser (16 × 5-in./38-cal. main battery) (Note: These cruisers were intended as destroyer leaders when designed. After the first two to be used in this role, Atlanta and Juneau, were lost at the Naval Battle of Guadalcanal, this mission was abandoned and the anti-aircraft mission adopted.)

Atlanta (Capt. Samuel P. Jenkins)

Screen (Capt. Edward P. Sauer)

6 destroyers

1 Porter-class (8 × 5-in./38 SP/low elevation main battery): Balch
2 Gleaves-class (5 × 5-in. dual purpose main battery): Grayson, Monssen
1 Gridley-class (4 × 5-in./38 dual purpose main battery): Maury
2 Benham-class (4 × 5-in./38 dual purpose main battery): Benham, Ellet

==== Task Force 18 (deployed but did not take part in battle) ====
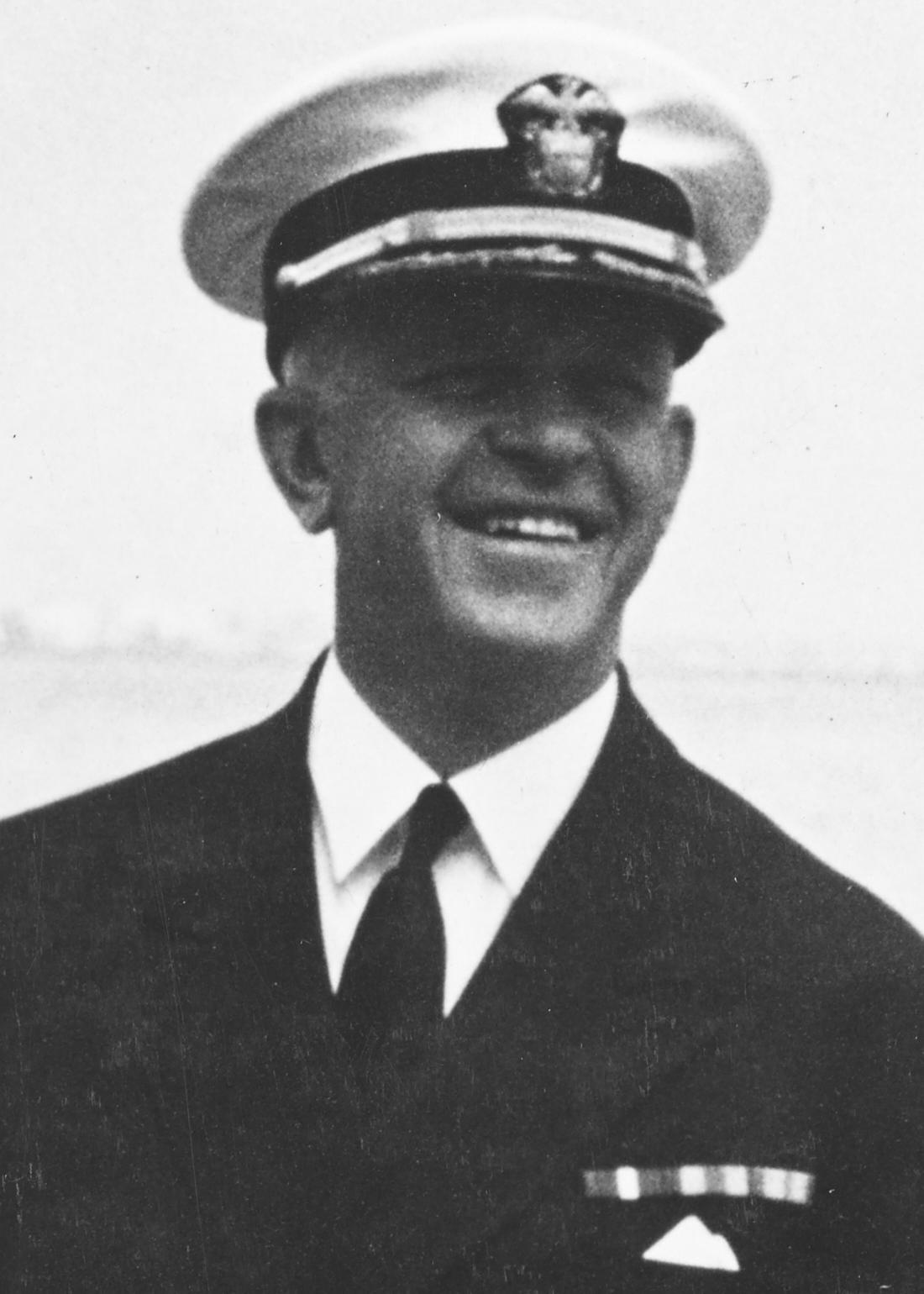
Leigh Noyes as a captain

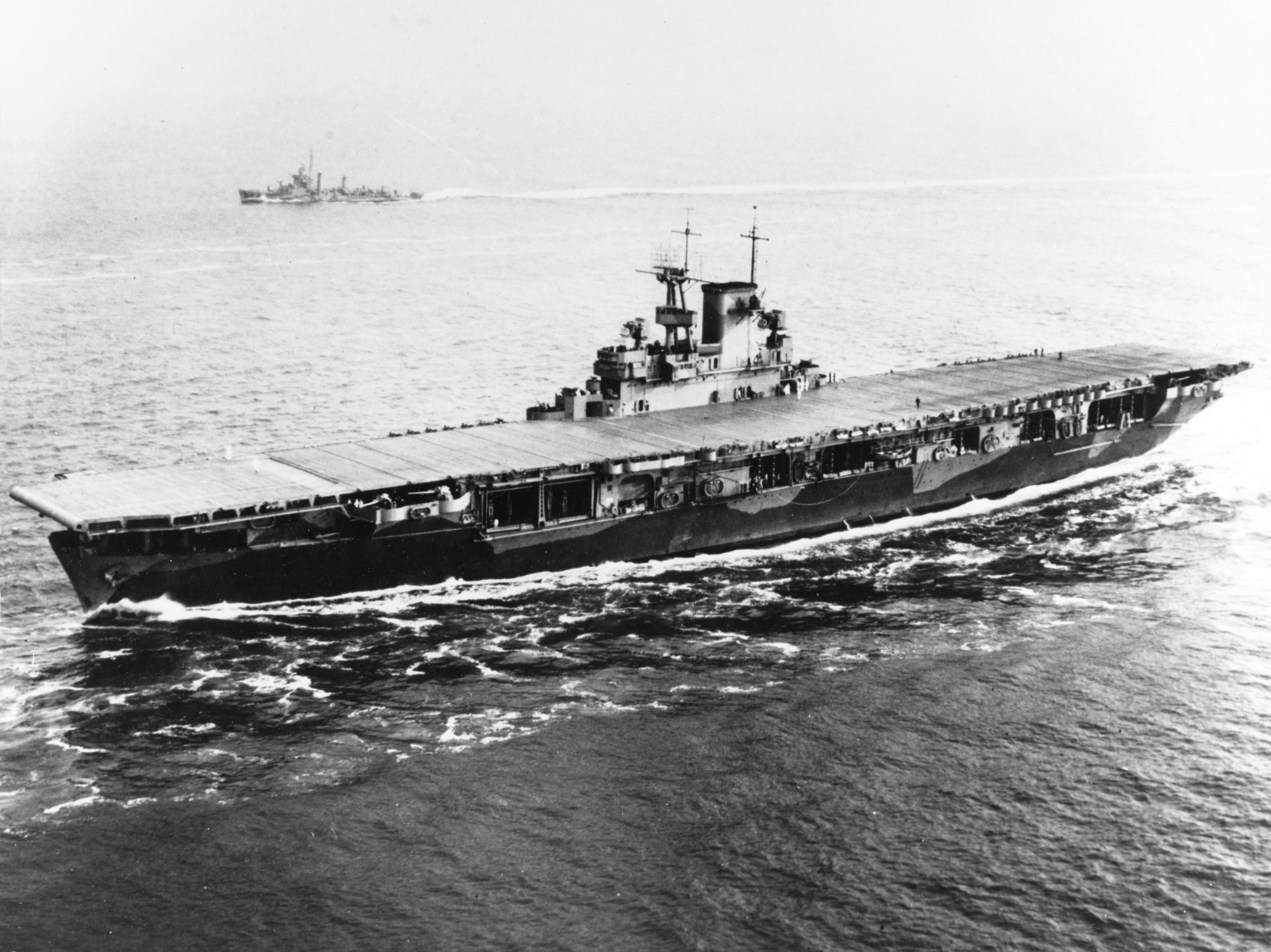
Wasp entering Hampton Roads 1942.

Rear Admiral Leigh Noyes in Wasp

1 Wasp-class fleet carrier

Wasp (Capt. Forrest P. Sherman)

Air Group (Lt. Cmdr. Wallace M. Beakley)

VF-71: 28 F4F Wildcat fighters (Lt. Cmdr. Courtney Shands)
VS-71: 18 SBD Dauntless scout bombers (Lt. Cmdr. John Eldridge)
VS-72: 18 SBD Dauntless scout bombers (Lt. Cmdr. Ernest M. Snowden)
VT-7: 15 TBF Avenger torpedo bombers (Lt. Henry A. Romberg)

Cruisers (Rear Adm. Norman Scott) (Note: Killed three months later at the Naval Battle of Guadalcanal.)

1 Pensacola-class heavy cruiser (10 × 8-in. main battery)

Salt Lake City (Capt. Charles H. McMorris)

1 New Orleans-class heavy cruiser (9 × 8-in. main battery)

San Francisco (Capt. Ernest G. Small)

1 Atlanta-class anti-aircraft light cruiser (16 × 5-in. main battery) S

San Juan (Capt. James E. Maher)

Screen (Capt. Robert G. Tobin)

7 destroyers

1 Porter-class (8 × 5-in. main battery): Selfridge
2 Gleaves-class (5 × 5-in. main battery): Aaron Ward, Buchanan
3 Benham-class (4 × 5-in. main battery): Lang, Stack, Sterett
1 Benson-class (4 × 5-in. main battery): Farenholt

== Individual attack waves ==
=== Attack on Enterprise (Nagumo carrier group 1st wave) ===
10 Mitsubishi A6M "Zeke" fighters: 4 from Shokaku, 6 from Zuikaku
27 Aichi D3A "Val" dive bombers: 18 from Shokaku, 9 from Zuikaku

=== Nagumo carrier group 2nd wave (found no targets) ===
9 Mitsubishi A6M "Zeke" fighters: 3 from Shokaku, 6 from Zuikaku
27 Aichi D3A "Val" dive bombers: 9 from Shokaku, 18 from Zuikaku

=== Ryūjō Attack on Henderson Field ===
6 Nakajima B5N "Kate" torpedo bombers: all from Ryūjō
14 Mitsubishi A6M "Zeke" fighters: all from Ryūjō

=== B-17 strike on Nagumo carrier group ===
TBD

=== Saratoga strike on Ryūjō ===
29 Douglas SBD-3 Dauntless Dive Bombers
7 Grumman TBF-1 Avenger Torpedo Bombers

=== B-17 strike on Ryūjō ===
TBD

== Bibliography ==
- Lundstrom, John B. (2005). First Team and the Guadalcanal Campaign: Naval Fighter Combat from August to November 1942 (New ed.). Annapolis, Maryland: Naval Institute Press. ISBN 1-59114-472-8.
- Morison, Samuel Eliot (1948). The Struggle for Guadalcanal, August 1942 – February 1943. History of United States Naval Operations in World War II. Vol. V. Boston: Little, Brown and Co. ISBN 0-7858-1306-3.
- Stille, Mark (2016). US Navy Light Cruisers, 1941-45. Oxford: Osprey Publishing, Ltd. ISBN 978-1-4728-1140-0.
- USS DEWEY - War Diary, 8/1/42 to 12/31/42 (Report). US Office of the Chief of Naval Operations. 1942.
