= Santa Cruz Islands order of battle =

1942 US-Japanese sea battle

IJ Combined Fleet and
US Pacific Fleet Commanders

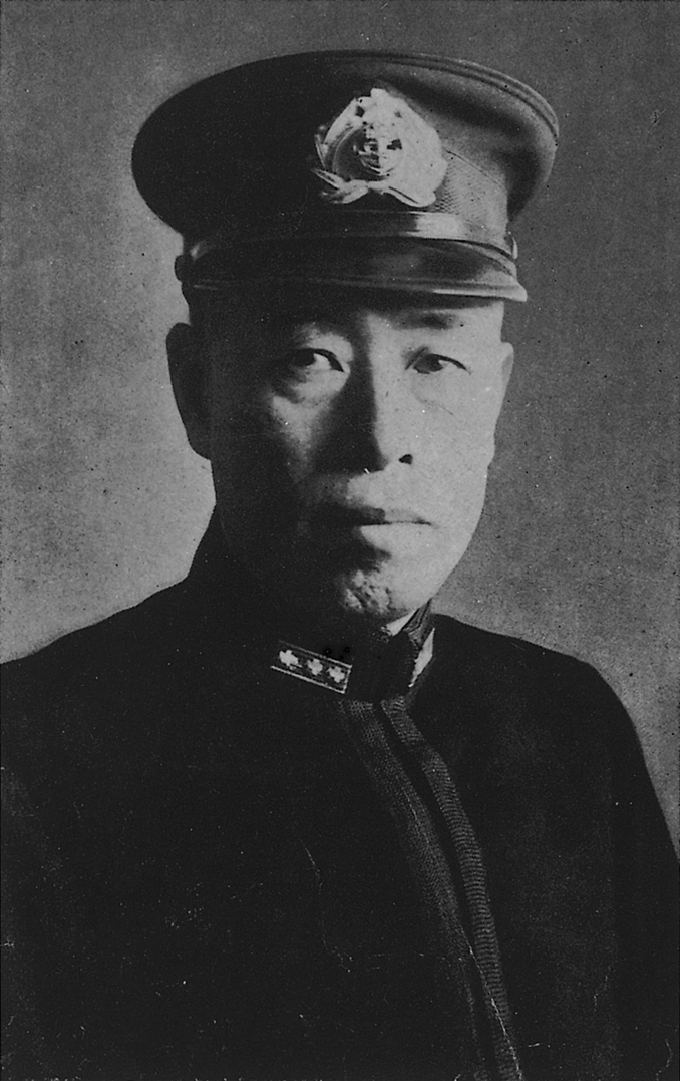
Adm. Isoroku Yamamoto (HQ at Tokyo)

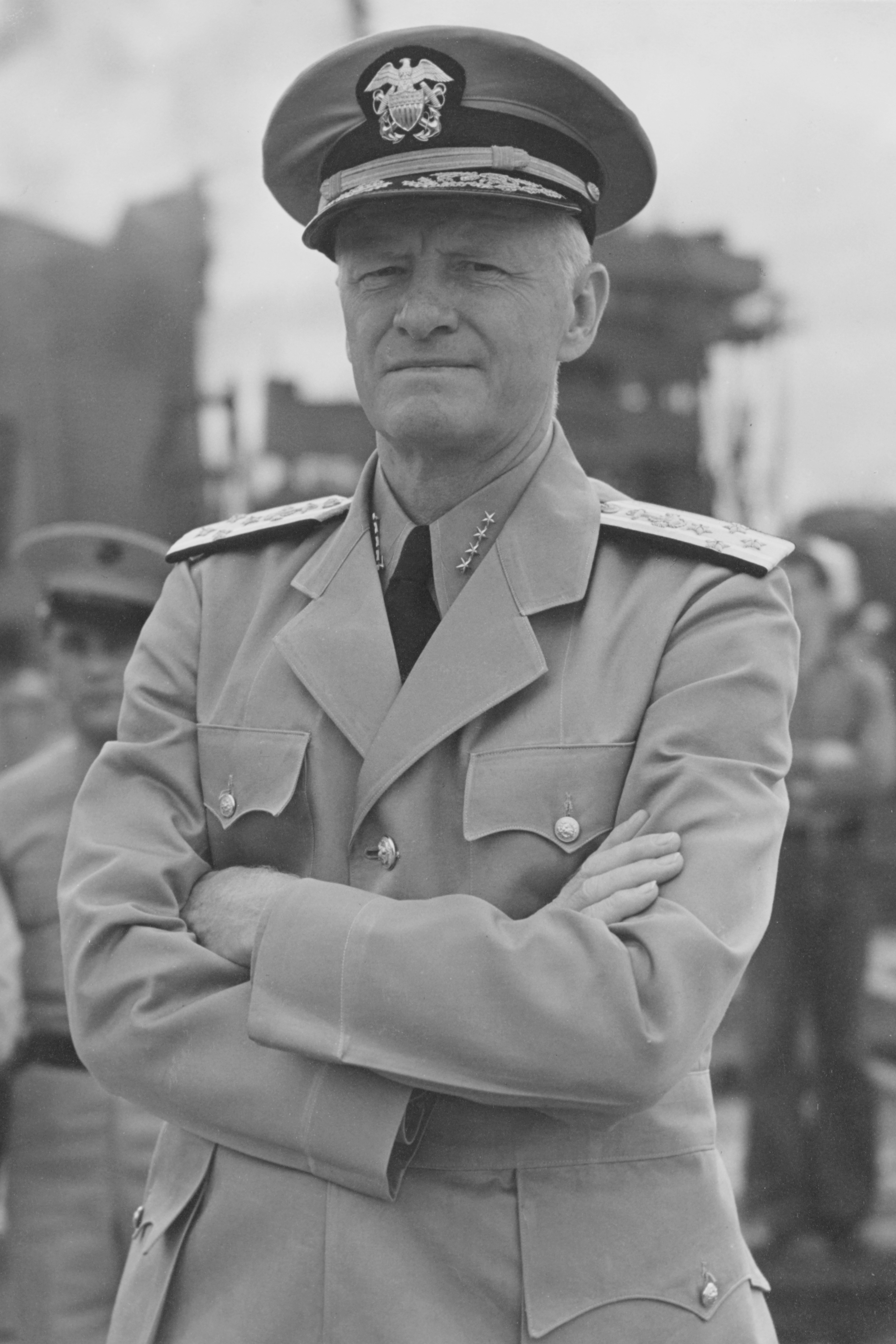
Adm. Chester W. Nimitz (HQ at Pearl Harbor)

The Battle of the Santa Cruz Islands was fought 25–27 October 1942 in the waters northwest of the Santa Cruz Islands by forces of the Imperial Japanese Navy's (IJN) Combined Fleet and the United States Navy's (USN) Pacific Fleet. The battle resulted from a major Japanese offensive with the goal to drive the US forces from Guadalcanal.

The battle can be viewed as a tactical Japanese victory as they sank the American aircraft carrier USS Hornet and badly damaged another, USS Enterprise, while suffering heavy damage in return to carriers Shōkaku and Zuihō. In strategic terms, however, it was ultimately a victory for the United States, as the Japanese failed in their objective to destroy American forces on and around Guadalcanal and suffered significant losses of experienced air crew.

Because the Japanese had the tactical initiative, their forces are listed first.

== Forces deployed ==
Losses in parentheses

Ship Type	(Empire of Japan) IJN	USN
Fleet carriers (CV)	3	2 (1)
Light carriers (CVL)	1	
Battleships (BB)	4	1
Heavy cruisers (CA)	8	3
Light cruisers (CL)	2	3
Destroyers (DD)	25	14 (1)
Combat Aircraft	199 (99)	136 (81)

== Japanese order of battle ==
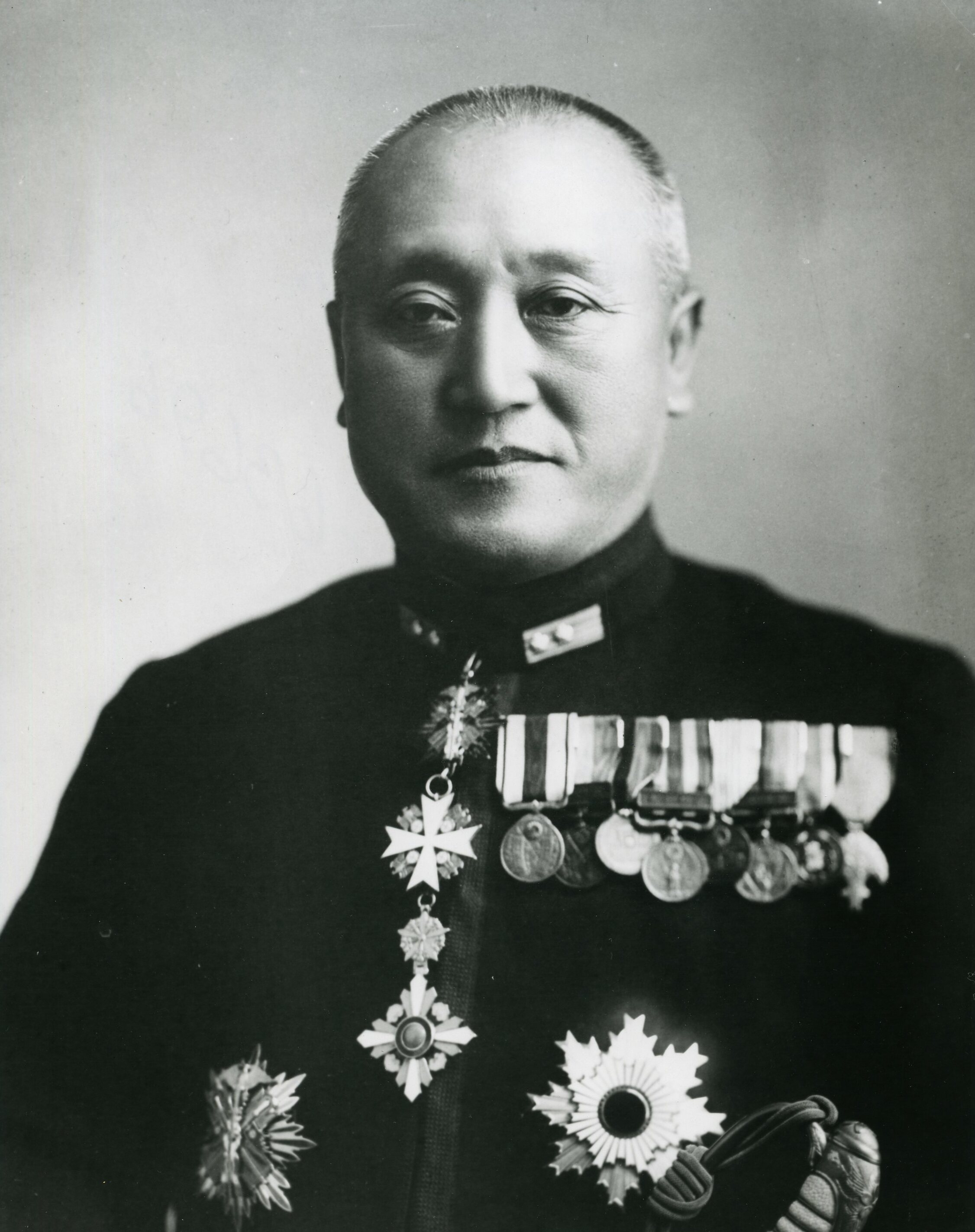
Vice Adm. Nobutake Kondo

=== Advance Force ===
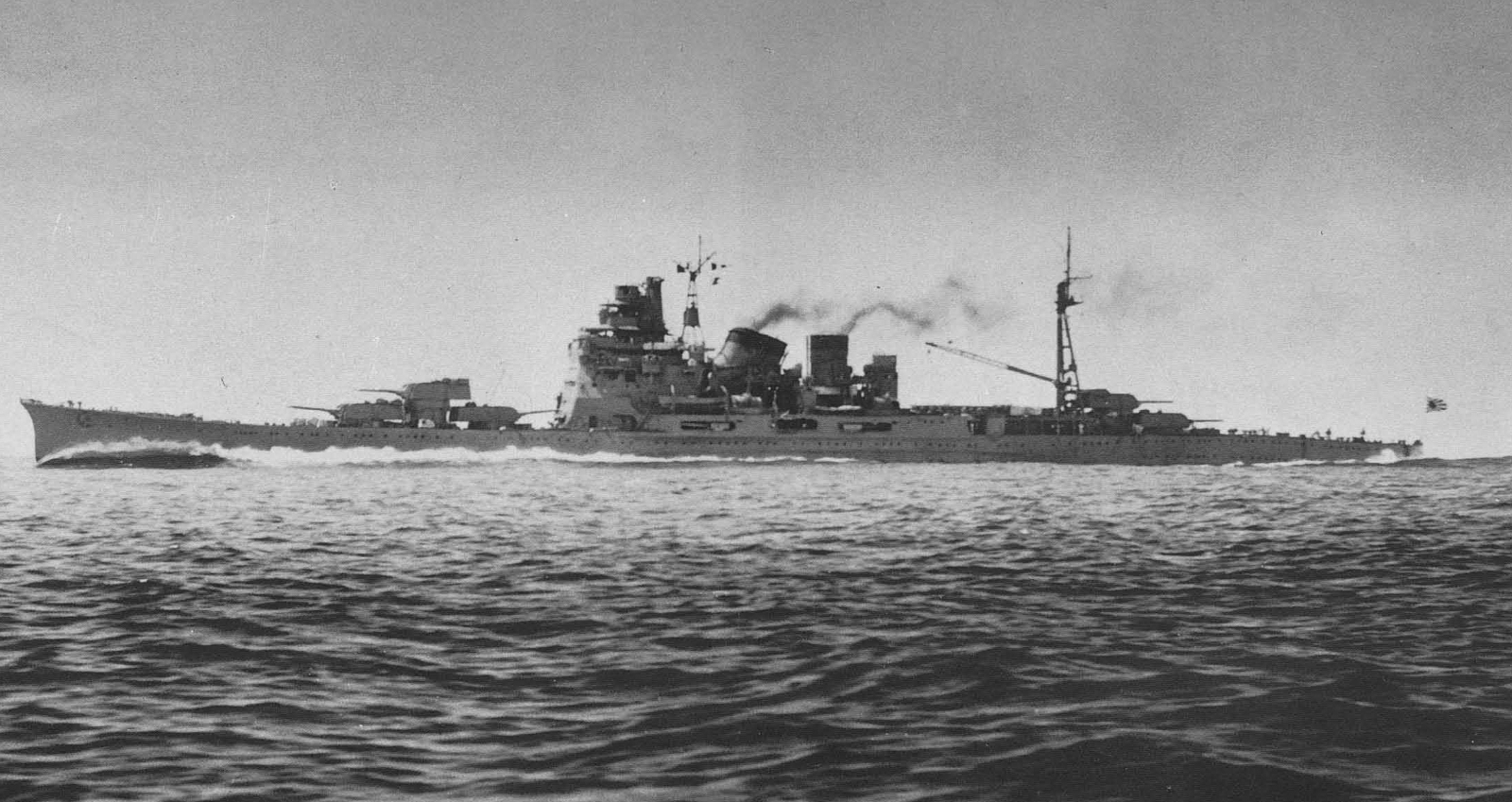
Heavy cruiser Atago underway

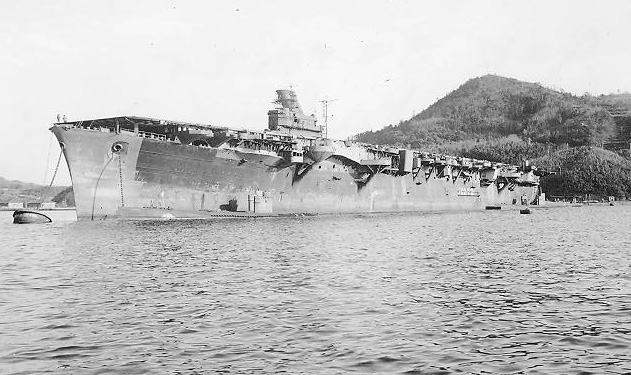
The converted aircraft carrier Jun'yō at Sasebo after the war

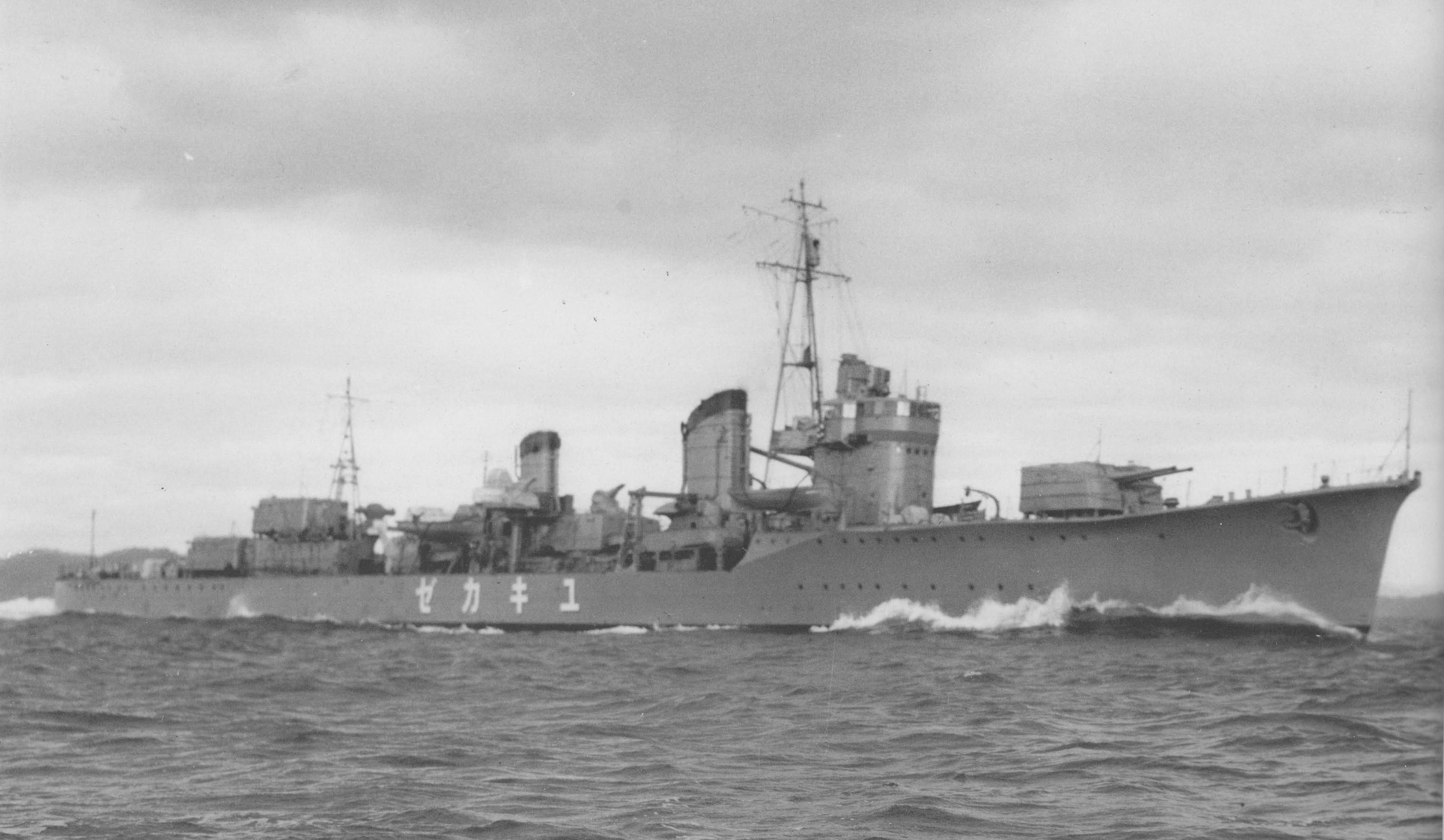
Kagerō-class destroyer

Vice Admiral Nobutake Kondo in heavy cruiser Atago

Main Body
Vice Admiral Kondo

Cruiser Division 4

2 Takao-class heavy cruisers (10 × 8-in. main battery): Atago, Takao

Cruiser Division 5 (Rear Adm. Sentaro Omori in heavy cruiser Myoko)

1 Myoko-class heavy cruiser (10 × 8-in. main battery): Myoko
1 Takao-class heavy cruiser (10 × 8-in. main battery): Maya

Destroyer Squadron 2 (Rear Adm. Raizo Tanaka in light cruiser Isuzu)

1 Nagara-class light cruiser (7 × 5.5-in. main battery): Isuzu
2 Yugumo-class destroyers (6 × 5-in. main battery): Makinami, Naganami
3 Shiratsuyu-class destroyers (5 × 5-in. main battery): Kawakaze, Suzukaze, Umikaze

Carrier Group
Rear Admiral Kakuji Kakuta in carrier Jun'yō

Carrier Division 2

2 Hiyō-class fleet carriers

Jun'yō

20 Mitsubishi A6M "Zeke" fighters (Lt. Yoshio Shiga)
17 Aichi D3A "Val" dive bombers (Lt. Masao Yamaguchi†)
7 Nakajima B5N "Kate" torpedo bombers (Lt. Yoshiaki Irikiin†)

Hiyō (Note: Left formation for Truk 22 October.)

21 Mitsubishi A6M "Zeke" fighters
18 Aichi D3A "Val" dive bombers
9 Nakajima B5N "Kate" torpedo bombers

Screen

2 Kagerō-class destroyers (6 × 5-in. main battery): Kuroshio, Hayashio

Support Group
Vice Admiral Takeo Kurita in battleship Kongō

Battleship Division 3

2 Kongō-class fast battleships (8 × 14-in. main battery): Kongō, Haruna

Screen

2 Kagerō-class destroyers (6 × 5-in. main battery): Oyashio, Kagerō

=== Carrier Striking Force ===
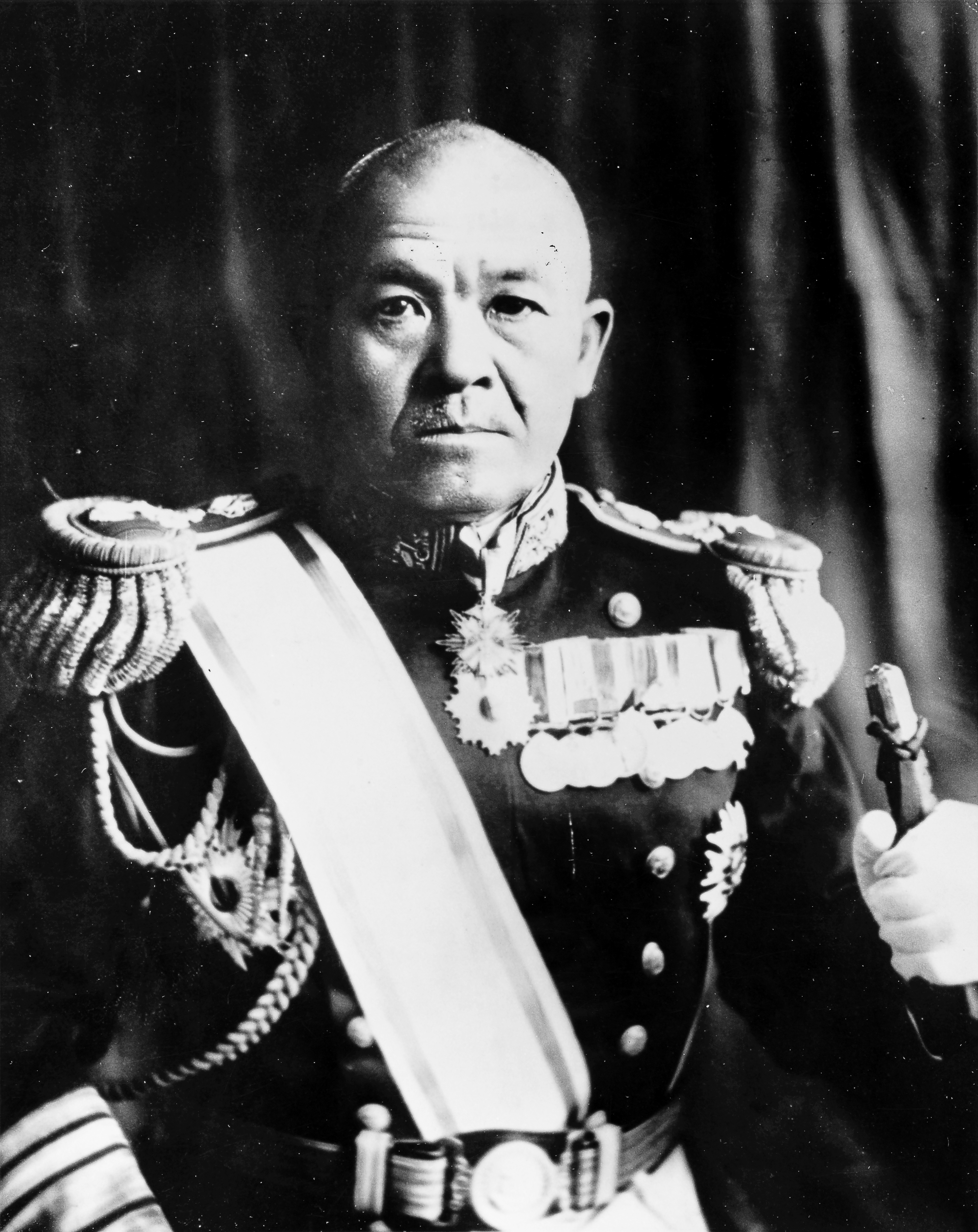
Vice Adm. Chuichi Nagumo

Early-war Japanese naval aircraft

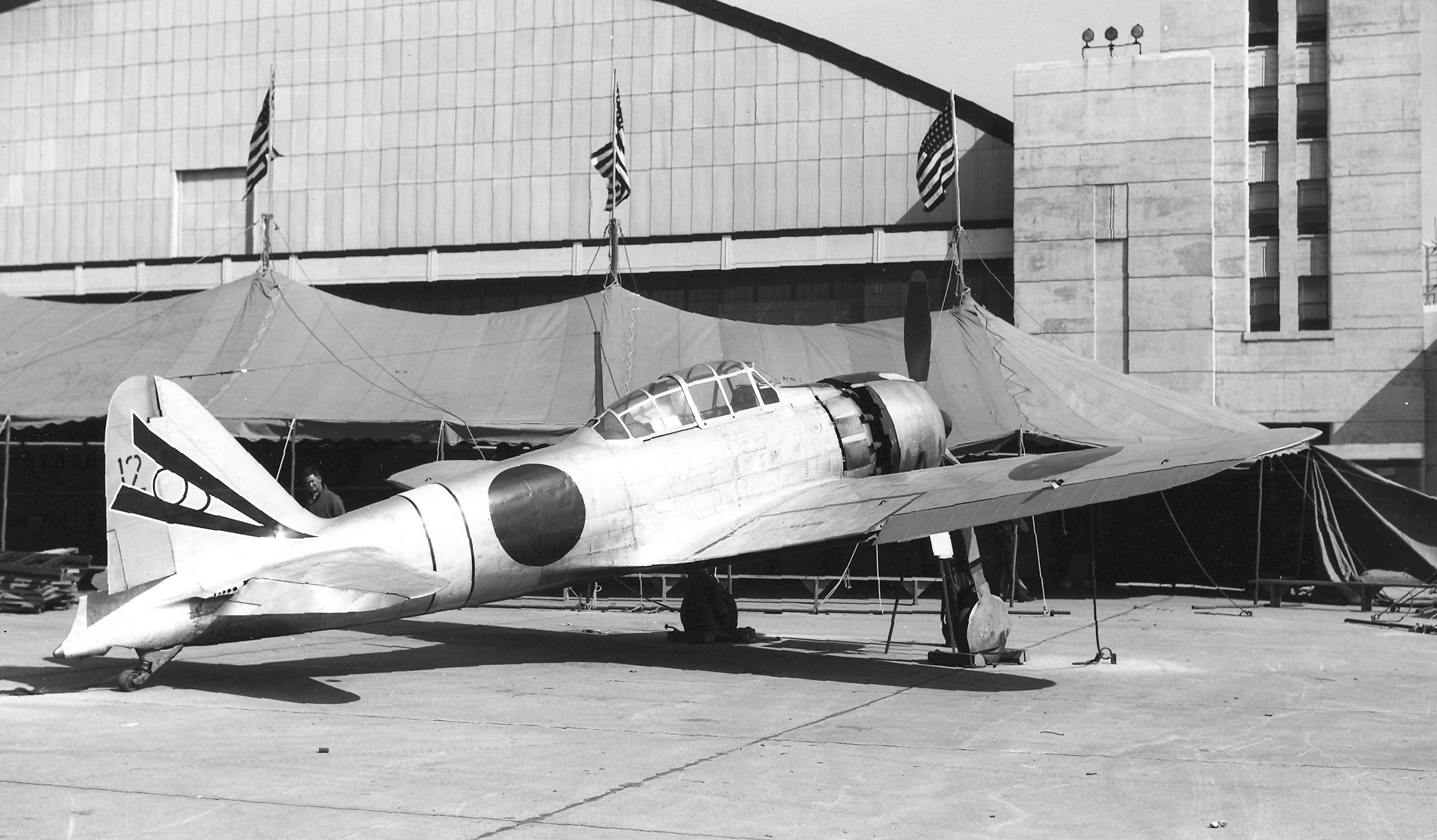
Mitsubishi A6M "Zeke" fighter

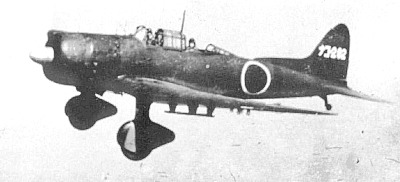
Aichi D3A "Val" dive bomber

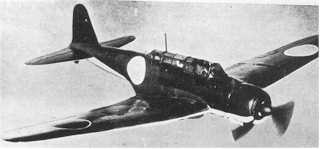
Nakajima B5N "Kate" torpedo bomber

Vice Admiral Chūichi Nagumo

Carrier Group
Vice Admiral Nagumo

2 fleet carriers

Shōkaku

20 Mitsubishi A6M "Zeke" fighters (Lt. Hideki Shingō)
21 Aichi D3A "Val" dive bombers (Lt. Cmdr. Mamoru Seki†)
24 Nakajima B5N "Kate" torpedo bombers (Lt. Cmdr. Shigeharu Murata†)

Zuikaku

20 Mitsubishi A6M "Zeke" fighters (Lt. Ayao Shirane)
23 Aichi D3A "Val" dive bombers (Lt. Sadamu Takahashi)
20 Nakajima B5N "Kate" torpedo bombers (Lt. Shigeichiro Imajuku†)

1 light carrier

Zuihō

20 Mitsubishi A6M "Zeke" fighters (Lt. Masao Satō)
6 Nakajima B5N "Kate" torpedo bombers (Lt(jg). Ichiro Tanaka)

Screen

1 Mogami-class heavy cruiser (10 × 8-in. main battery): Kumano
7 Kagerō-class destroyers (6 × 5-in. main battery): Hatsukaze, Yukikaze, Maikaze, Hamakaze, Amatsukaze, Tokitsukaze, Arashi
1 Akizuki-class destroyer (8 × 4-in. main battery): Teruzuki

=== Vanguard Group ===
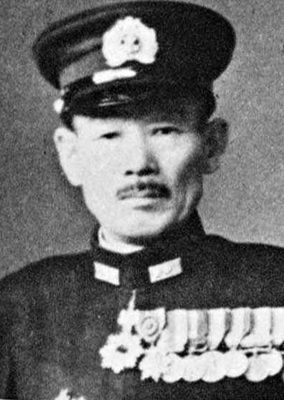
Rear Adm. Hiroaki Abe

Rear Admiral Hiroaki Abe in Hiei

Battleship Division 11

2 Kongo-class fast battleships (8 × 14-in. main battery): Hiei, Kirishima

Cruiser Division 7 (Rear Adm. Shoji Nishimura)

1 Mogami-class heavy cruiser (10 × 8-in. main battery): Suzuya

Cruiser Division 8 (Rear Adm. Chūichi Hara in Tone)

2 Tone-class heavy cruisers (8 × 8-in. main battery): Tone, Chikuma

Destroyer Squadron 10 (Rear Adm. Susumu Kimura)

1 Nagara-class light cruiser (7 × 5.5-in. main battery): Nagara
3 Yugumo-class destroyers (6 × 5-in. main battery): Makigumo, Kazagumo, Yūgumo
4 Kagerō-class destroyers (6 × 5-in. main battery): Akigumo, Urakaze, Tanikaze, Isokaze

== American order of battle ==
=== Task Force 16 ===
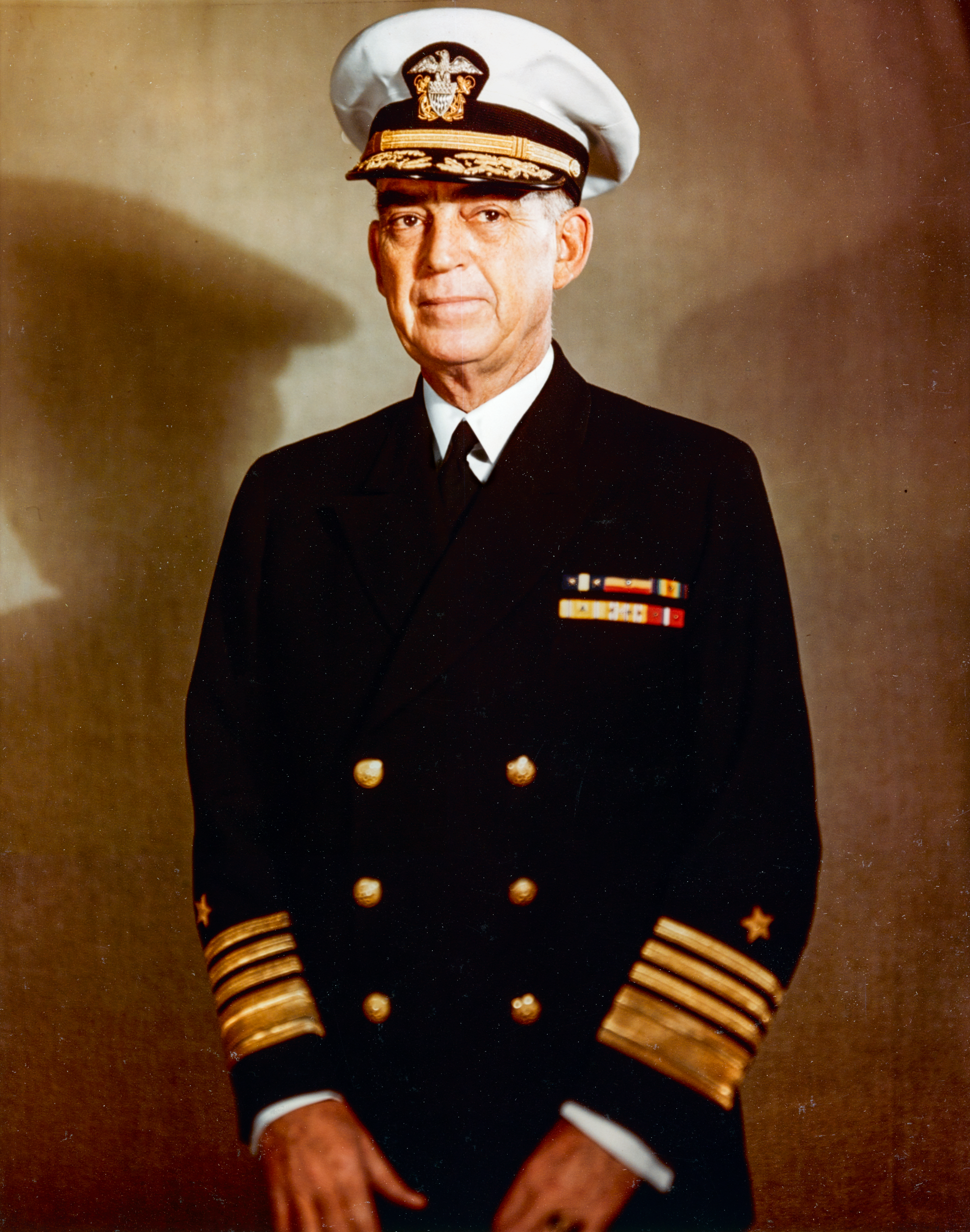
Thomas C. Kinkaid as an admiral and commander Seventh Fleet

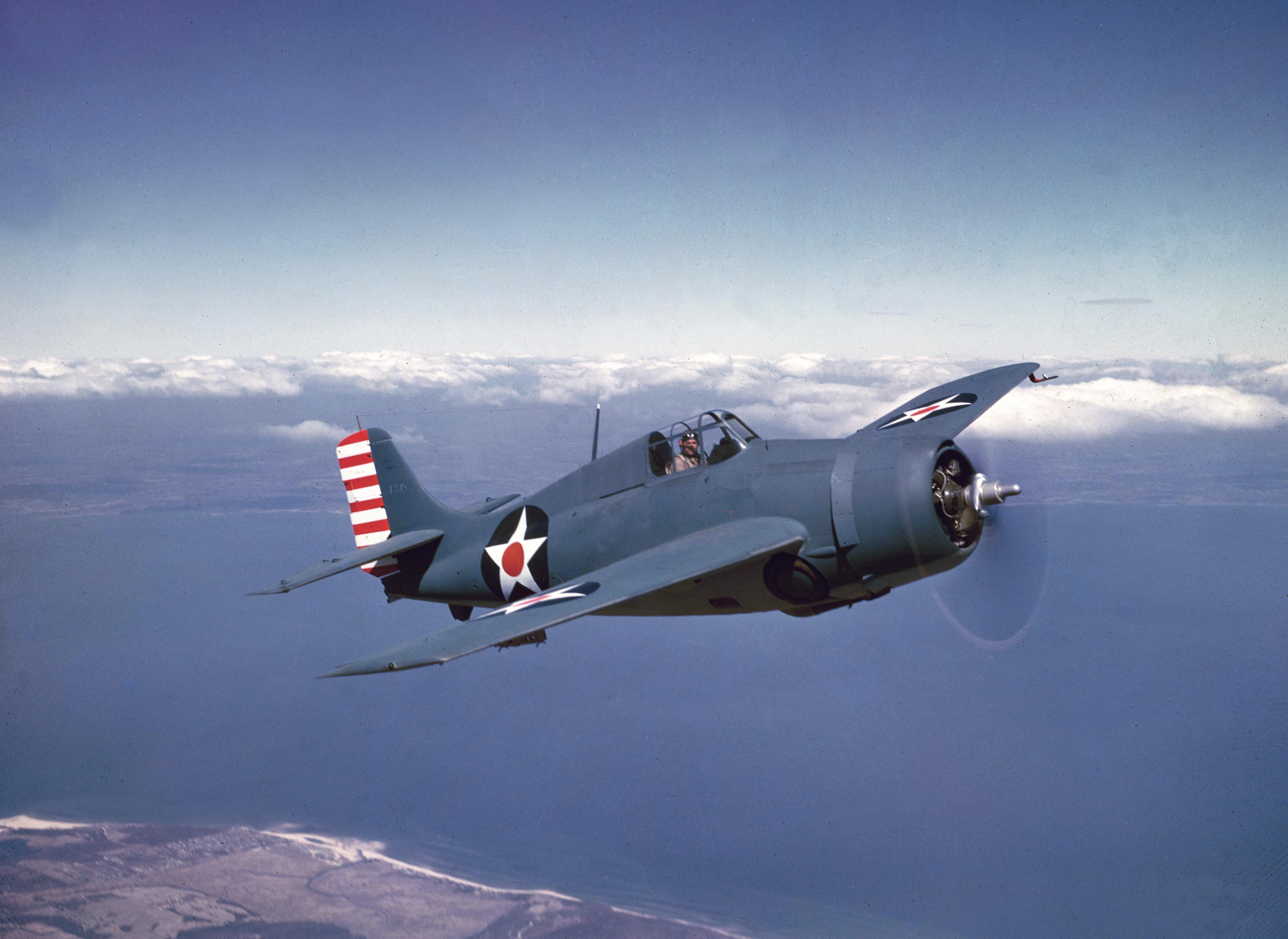
Grumman F4F Wildcat fighter

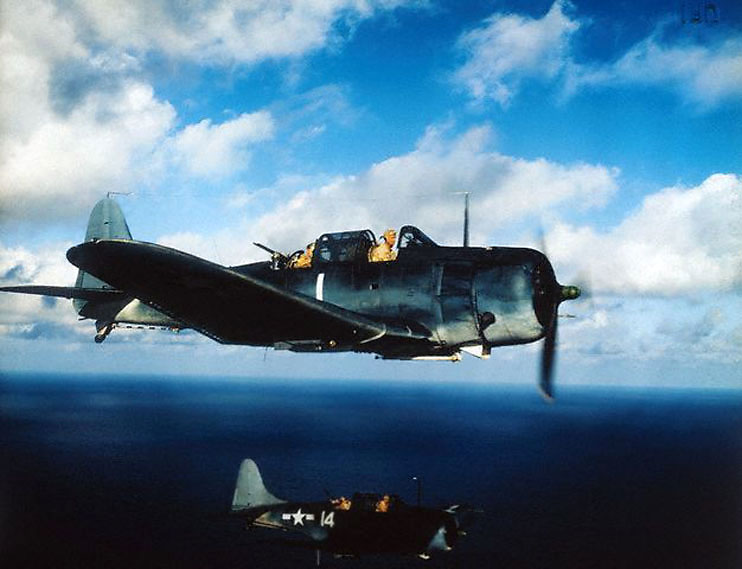
Douglas SBD Dauntless dive bomber

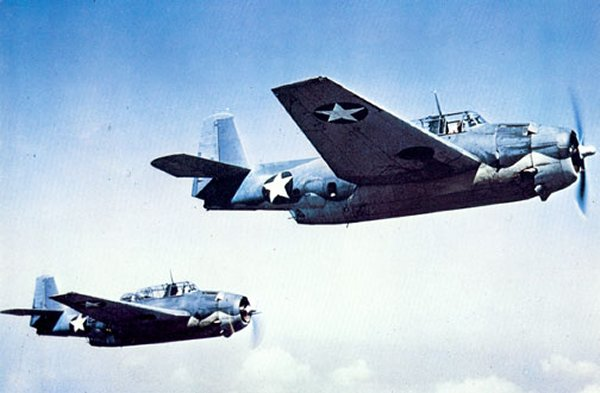
Grumman TBF Avenger torpedo bomber

Rear Admiral Thomas C. Kinkaid

==== Task Force 16 ====
Rear Admiral Kinkaid in fleet carrier Enterprise

1 Yorktown-class fleet carrier

Enterprise (Capt. Osborne B. Hardison)

Air Group (Cmdr. Richard K. Gaines)

VF-10: 34 F4F Wildcat fighters (Lt. Cmdr. James H. Flatley)
VB-10: 14 SBD Dauntless dive bombers (Lt. Cmdr. James A. Thomas)
VS-10: 20 SBD Dauntless scout bombers (Lt. Cmdr. James R. Lee)
VT-10: 9 TBF Avenger torpedo bombers (Lt. Cmdr. John A. Collett†)

Screen

1 South Dakota-class fast battleship (9 × 16-in. main battery): South Dakota

Cruiser Division 4 (Rear Adm. Mahlon S. Tisdale in heavy cruiser Portland)

1 Portland-class heavy cruiser (9 × 8-in. main battery): Portland
1 Atlanta-class anti-aircraft light cruiser (16 × 5-in. main battery): San Juan

Destroyer Squadron 5 (Capt. Charles L. Cecil)

1 Porter-class destroyer (8 × 5-in. main battery): Porter
1 Mahan-class destroyer (5 × 5-in. main battery): Mahan

Destroyer Division 10 (Cmdr. Thomas M. Stokes)

5 Mahan-class destroyers (5 × 5-in. main battery): Cushing, Preston, Smith, Conyngham, Shaw
1 Gridley-class destroyer (4 × 5-in. main battery): Maury

==== Task Force 17 ====
Rear Admiral George D. Murray in fleet carrier Hornet

1 Yorktown-class fleet carrier

Hornet (Capt. Charles P. Mason)

Air Group (Cmdr. Walter F. Rodee)

VF-72: 38 F4F Wildcat fighters (Lt. Cmdr. Henry G. Sanchez)
VB-8: 15 SBD Dauntless dive bombers (Lt. James E. Vose)
VS-8: 16 SBD Dauntless scout bombers (Lt. Cmdr. William J. Widhelm)
VT-6: 15 TBF Avenger torpedo bombers (Lt. Edwin B. Parker, Jr.)

Screen

Cruiser Division 5 (Rear Adm. Howard H. Good) in heavy cruiser Northampton

1 Northampton-class (9 × 8-in. main battery): Northampton
1 Pensacola-class heavy cruiser (10 × 8-iun. main battery): Pensacola
2 Atlanta-class anti-aircraft light cruisers (16 × 5-in. main battery): San Diego, Juneau

Destroyer Squadron 2 (Cmdr. Arnold E. True)

5 Sims-class destroyers (4 × 5-in. main battery): Morris, Anderson, Hughes, Mustin, Russell
1 Benson-class destroyer (4 × 5-in. main battery): Barton

== Individual attack waves ==
=== Attack on Hornet (Nagumo carrier group first wave) ===
21 Mitsubishi A6M "Zeke" fighters (9 of which divert to attack incoming aircraft)
21 Aichi D3A "Val" dive bombers
22 Nakajima B5N "Kate" torpedo bombers (2 as navigational aid only)

=== Attack on Enterprise group (Nagumo carrier group second wave) ===
9 Mitsubishi A6M "Zeke" fighters
19 Aichi D3A "Val" dive bombers
16 Nakajima B5N "Kate" torpedo bombers

=== Jun'yo 1st wave against Enterprise group ===
12 Mitsubishi A6M "Zeke" fighters
17 Aichi D3A "Val" dive bombers

=== Jun'yo 2nd wave (1 torpedo hit on towed Hornet) ===
8 Mitsubishi A6M "Zeke" fighters
7 Nakajima B5N "Kate" torpedo bombers

=== Zuikaku 3rd wave (1 bomb hit on Hornet being abandoned) ===
5 Mitsubishi A6M "Zeke" fighters
2 Aichi D3A "Val" dive bombers
7 Nakajima B5N "Kate" torpedo bombers

=== Jun'yo 3rd wave (1 bomb hit on abandoned Hornet) ===
6 Mitsubishi A6M "Zeke" fighters
4 Aichi D3A "Val" dive bombers

=== US first wave (Hornet): bomb hits on Shokaku, torpedo misses on Tone ===
8 F4F Wildcat fighters
15 SBD Dauntless dive bombers (two shot down)
6 TBF Avenger torpedo bombers

=== US second wave (Enterprise): 1 bomb on Chikuma, torpedo misses on Suzuya ===
8 F4F Wildcat fighters (3 shot down, 1 returned)
3 SBD Dauntless dive bombers
9 TBF Avenger torpedo bombers (2 shot down, 2 returned)

=== US third wave (Hornet): 2 bombs, 1 torpedo on Chikuma ===
7 F4F Wildcat fighters
9 SBD Dauntless dive bombers
10 TBF Avenger torpedo bombers

== Bibliography ==
- Frank, Richard B. (1990). Guadalcanal: The Definitive Account of the Landmark Battle. New York: Penguin Group. ISBN 0-14-016561-4.
- Hammel, Eric (1999). Carrier Strike: The Battle of the Santa Cruz Islands, October 1942. Pacifica, California: Pacifica Press. ISBN 0-9355-5337-1.
- Lundstrom, John B. (2005). The First Team and the Guadalcanal Campaign: Naval Fighter Combat from August to November 1942 (New ed.). Annapolis, Maryland: Naval Institute Press. ISBN 1-59114-472-8.
- Morison, Samuel Eliot (1948). The Struggle for Guadalcanal, August 1942 – February 1943: Volume V of History of United States Naval Operations in World War II. Boston, Massachusetts: Little, Brown and Co. ISBN 0-7858-1306-3.
