= Sadamu Takahashi =

- 高橋 定
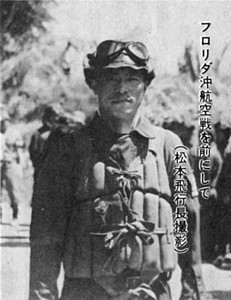
- Born: 5 December 1912; Matsuyama, Japan
- Died: 25 December 2015 (aged 103)
- Military career
- Allegiance: Empire of Japan
- Branch: Imperial Japanese Navy Air Service (IJN); Japan Maritime Self-Defense Force (JMSDF)
- Service years: 1933–1945 (IJN); 1954–1970 (JMSDF)
- Rank: Lieutenant Commander (IJN) Vice Admiral (JMSDF)
- Units: 12th Air Group; Ryūjō; 14th Air Group; 31st Air Group; Zuikaku
- Conflicts: Second Sino-Japanese War; World War II; Invasion of Philippines; Solomon Islands Campaign; Battle of the Eastern Solomons; Battle of the Santa Cruz Islands; Operation I-Go

Sadamu Takahashi (高橋 定, Takahashi Sadamu; December 5, 1912 – December 25, 2015) was a dive bomber pilot officer in the Imperial Japanese Navy (IJN) during World War II. He is best known for leading the Zuikaku's dive bomber squadron during the Battle of the Eastern Solomons and the Battle of the Santa Cruz Islands. He survived the war and later served in the Japan Self-Defense Forces retiring in 1970 with the rank of Vice Admiral.

== Early career ==
Sadamu Takahashi enrolled in the Imperial Japanese Naval Academy in April 1930 and graduated from the 61st class in November 1933. In April 1935, he was commissioned as an ensign, and in November was selected for the navy pilot training program at Kasumigaura Air Group. After completion of the course, he was promoted to lieutenant junior grade in December 1936 and was then assigned to Ōmura Air Group on Kyushu, where he received advanced training on dive bombing. In 1937, he was transferred to China and assigned to 12th Air Group, where he participated in several aerial operations during the Second Sino-Japanese War, including around Shanghai and Nanjing. In December, he was recalled to Japan to serve as an instructor at Kasumigaura Air Group.

In November 1938, Takahashi was promoted to full lieutenant and was transferred to Ryūjō in December, where he was appointed flight division leader (Buntaichō) in the dive bomber squadron. In October 1939, he was reassigned to the 14th Air Group and participated in several operations in Southern China. In November 1940, he became one of the flight division leaders of Tsukuba Air Group.

== Pacific War ==
At the beginning of 1942, he was assigned to the 31st Air Group as a dive bomber squadron leader. In February, his squadron operated from Nichols Field in the Philippines and participated in the attacks on the US troops during the Bataan and the Corregidor. In June, he was transferred to the carrier Zuikaku and became its group commander (Hikōtaichō), as well as its dive bomber squadron leader.

In late August 1942, Lieutenant Takahashi participated in the Battle of the Eastern Solomons. He led 27 Aichi D3A dive bombers in the second strike wave against United States Navy (USN) fleet. His strike was escorted by nine Mitsubishi A6M Zero fighters led by Lieutenant Ayao Shirane. They could not, however, locate the enemy carriers, as his radio failed to receive a report on their updated position. Some of the D3A pilots in his group did receive the radio message but assumed that Takahashi had received it too and said nothing. Nevertheless, the carrier Enterprise was badly damaged by the first wave strike under the command of Lieutenant Commander Mamoru Seki. Takahashi only learned about the report, which may have allowed him to finish off Enterprise, after he landed back on Zuikaku that evening.

In late October 1942, Lieutenant Takahashi participated in the Battle of the Santa Cruz Islands, where he led 21 Aichi D3A dive bombers in the first strike wave against the US carriers. The strike was under the overall command of Lieutenant Commander Shigeharu Murata, while escort was provided by A6M Zeros led by Lieutenant Moriyasu Hidaka from Zuihō and Lieutenant Ayao Shirane from Zuikaku. During the attack, his D3A was intercepted by the enemy Combat Air Patrol of Grumman F4F Wildcat fighters. He was able to shake them off, but, in the process, his plane's rudder jammed, forcing him to abort the mission and turn over command. Still, he managed to return to the Japanese fleet and ditched near a friendly oiler. Nevertheless, the first wave, as well as follow-up strikes, crippled the carrier Hornet and badly damaged Enterprise; however, many experienced pilots and flight leaders perished in the attack, including Murata and second wave commander Mamoru Seki.

Takahashi serving in the JSDF

Afterwards, Lieutenant Takahashi and his dive bomber squadron were transferred to Rabaul and participated in Operation I-Go. He survived the war and later served in Japan Self-Defense Forces from 1954 to 1970.
