= Moriyasu Hidaka =

- 日高 盛康
- Born: 1917; Tokyo, Japan
- Died: 15 July 2010 (aged 92–93)
- Military career
- Allegiance: Empire of Japan
- Branch: Imperial Japanese Navy Air Service (IJN)
- Service years: 1938–1945
- Rank: Lieutenant Commander
- Units: Hōshō; Zuihō; Zuikaku; Jun'yō; 304th Air Group; 252nd Air Group
- Conflicts: World War II; Solomon Islands Campaign; Battle of the Eastern Solomons; Battle of the Santa Cruz Islands; New Guinea Campaign; Operation I-Go

Moriyasu Hidaka (日高 盛康, Hidaka Moriyasu; 1917 – 15 July 2010) was a fighter pilot officer in the Imperial Japanese Navy during World War II. He participated in various battles and campaigns throughout the Pacific War and survived the war.

== Early career ==
Moriyasu Hidaka graduated from the 66th class of Imperial Japanese Naval Academy in 1938. He completed his fighter pilot specialization in June 1940 at Tsukuba Air Group.

== Pacific War ==
Lieutenant (junior grade) Hidaka was one of the division leaders (Buntaichō) on carrier Hōshō from December 1941 to April 1942. After that, he was transferred to the carrier Zuihō, where he also served as division leader.

Prior to the Battle of the Eastern Solomons, Lieutenant Hidaka was temporarily transferred to the carrier Zuikaku as a part of Ayao Shirane's fighter squadron. During the battle, he led six Mitsubishi A6M Zeros escorting 27 Aichi D3A dive bombers, led by Lieutenant Commander Mamoru Seki, against the US carrier fleet. While Seki coordinated the dive bombing attack, Lieutenant Hidaka and his fighters engaged the intercepting Grumman F4F Wildcat fighters that comprised the fleet's combat air patrol (CAP). This action prevented part of the CAP from attacking the dive bombers and resulted in at least one Wildcat being destroyed. However, his group suffered heavy casualties in exchange, losing three Zeros (including both of his wingmen). After the battle, on 28 August, he was temporarily stationed on Buka Island along with Shōkaku and Zuikaku air groups to fly a few missions against Guadalcanal. Afterwards he was transferred back to Zuihō.

In late October 1942, Lieutenant Hidaka participated in the Battle of the Santa Cruz Islands. He led a group of nine Zuihō Zeros to escort the first strike wave against the US carriers that consisted of 21 D3A dive bombers and 20 B5N torpedo bombers, all under the command of Lieutenant Commander Shigeharu Murata. An additional escort consisted of four Shōkaku Zeros led by Lieutenant Hisayoshi Miyajima, and eight from Zuikaku led by Lieutenant Shirane. On the way to the enemy carriers, they encountered a US strike from Enterprise on a reciprocal course. Lieutenant Hidaka made the decision to abandon his escort duty and attack the enemy strike force. They decimated the USN Grumman TBF Avenger bombers (two were shot down and two had to return) and their escorting Wildcat fighters (three were shot down and one had to return), at the cost of two Zeros shot down, two missing, and one severely damaged. Low on ammunition and fuel, they returned home without finding their own bombers. Lieutenant Hidaka's action left the Japanese strike force with considerably fewer escorting Zeros and may have contributed to the resulting heavy losses among Japanese aircraft and aircrew, including the highly valued Lieutenant Commander Murata.

In April 1943, he participated in Operation I-Go. In November, he was transferred to the carrier Jun'yō, where he became its air group commander (Hikōtaichō). He was later serving in land-based units (304th Air Group and 252nd Air Group) until the end of the war.

== Later career ==
Lieutenant Commander Hidaka survived the war and later served in Japan Self-Defense Forces. He was also a test pilot for Fuji Heavy Industries.
