= Ayao Shirane =

- 白根 斐夫
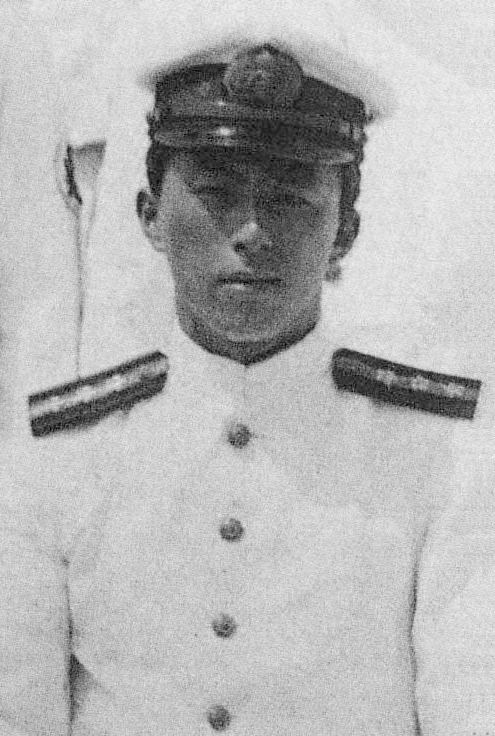
- Born: August 7, 1916; Tokyo, Japan
- Died: 24 November 1944 (aged 28); Leyte, Philippines
- Military career
- Allegiance: Empire of Japan
- Branch: Imperial Japanese Navy Air Service (IJN)
- Service years: 1937–1944
- Rank: Commander
- Units: 12th Air Group; Akagi; Zuikaku
- Conflicts: Second Sino-Japanese War; World War II; Attack on Darwin; Indian Ocean Raid; Battle of Midway; Battle of the Eastern Solomons; Battle of the Santa Cruz Islands; Solomon Islands Campaign

Ayao Shirane (白根 斐夫, Shirane Ayao; August 7, 1916 – 24 November 1944) was a fighter ace in the Imperial Japanese Navy (IJN) during World War II. He participated in various battles and campaigns throughout the Pacific War and was eventually shot down and killed over Leyte, Philippines on 24 November 1944. He was officially credited with destroying nine enemy aircraft.

== Early career ==
Ayao Shirane enrolled in the Imperial Japanese Naval Academy in April 1933, and graduated as part of the 64th class in March 1937. He completed the navy pilot training program and became a fighter pilot in March 1939. He was assigned to the 12th Air Group in Central China in September of that year, and on 19 August 1940 participated in the Bombing of Chongqing. This mission marked the combat debut of the new Mitsubishi A6M Zero fighter, although no aerial opposition was encountered. On 13 September, Shirane led six of Lieutenant Saburō Shindo's 13 Zeros on a bomber escort mission to Hankow. This mission marked the Zero's true baptism of fire, with the Japanese pilots claiming 27 out of 30 Chinese fighters (including one for Shirane) without suffering any losses in return. He was promoted to full lieutenant in May 1941.

== Pacific War ==
At the start of the Pacific War, Lieutenant Shirane was transferred to the carrier Akagi and participated in several early battles, including the Attack on Darwin and the Indian Ocean Raid. He was eventually appointed flight division leader (Buntaichō) of Akagi's fighter squadron.

On 4 June 1942, he participated in the Battle of Midway, leading nine Akagi Zeros as part of the morning strike against Midway Island. His unit engaged the defending fighters of VMF-221 (claiming 11 destroyed), and then strafed the island, losing one plane in return. He returned safely to Akagi, and was sent back into the air at 09.32 to intercept Douglas TBD Devastator torpedo bombers from USS Hornet's VT-8. His division missed the main engagement, but shot down the last plane, flown by Ensign George Gay, just after it cleared Sōryū. He went on to intercept the successive attacks of USS Enterprise's VT-6 and USS Yorktown's VT-3 and VF-3. However, during the latter engagement Akagi was attacked and mortally damaged by Douglas SBD Dauntless dive bombers from Enterprise. With his carrier sinking, Shirane landed aboard Hiryū, the sole undamaged carrier. He was launched as part of her Combat Air Patrol (CAP) at 15.34, but was unable to prevent her own sinking at the hands of Enterprise and Yorktown dive bombers. He ditched his Zero at 19.00 and was rescued by the cruiser Nagara.

In July 1942, Lieutenant Shirane was transferred to the carrier Zuikaku and became its fighter squadron leader. On 24 August 1942, he participated in the Battle of the Eastern Solomons. He led nine A6M Zeros that escorted the second strike on the US carriers, consisting of 27 Aichi D3A dive bombers under the command of Lieutenant Sadamu Takahashi (Zuikaku dive bomber squadron leader and Hikōtaichō). However, they could not locate the enemy carriers since Takahashi failed to receive an updated report on the position of the US fleet. Nevertheless, the carrier Enterprise was badly damaged by Lieutenant Commander Mamoru Seki's first strike, which included Shirane's academy classmate, Lieutenant Keiichi Arima, as a division leader.

On 26 October 1942, Lieutenant Shirane participated in the Battle of the Santa Cruz Islands. As the senior fighter leader in Lieutenant Commander Shigeharu Murata's first strike on the US carriers, he led 21 A6M Zeros (including eight from Zuikaku) as an escort for 21 Aichi D3A dive bombers and 20 Nakajima B5N torpedo bombers. However, on the way to the US fleet, nine Zuihō Zeros led by Lieutenant Saneyasu Hidaka broke off to attack an incoming US strike force on a reciprocal course, reducing the escort to twelve Zeros. Shirane's own Zuikaku fighters were involved in intense aerial combat over the US fleet, where they shot down several Grumman F4F Wildcat fighters and lost two of their own Zeros in return. After US dive bombers damaged Shōkaku and Zuihō, the remaining Japanese carriers, Zuikaku and Jun'yō, launched follow-up strikes against the US carriers. Shirane again led Zeros to escort the bombers.

On 1 November 1943, Shirane was promoted to lieutenant commander and was transferred to the 341st Air Group, which operated the new Kawanishi N1K fighters. On 24 November 1944, he was shot down and killed over Leyte, Philippines while he was engaged in combat with Lockheed P-38 Lightning fighters.
