= Kimura Susumu =

Japanese admiral

Admiral Susumu Kimura
- 木村 進
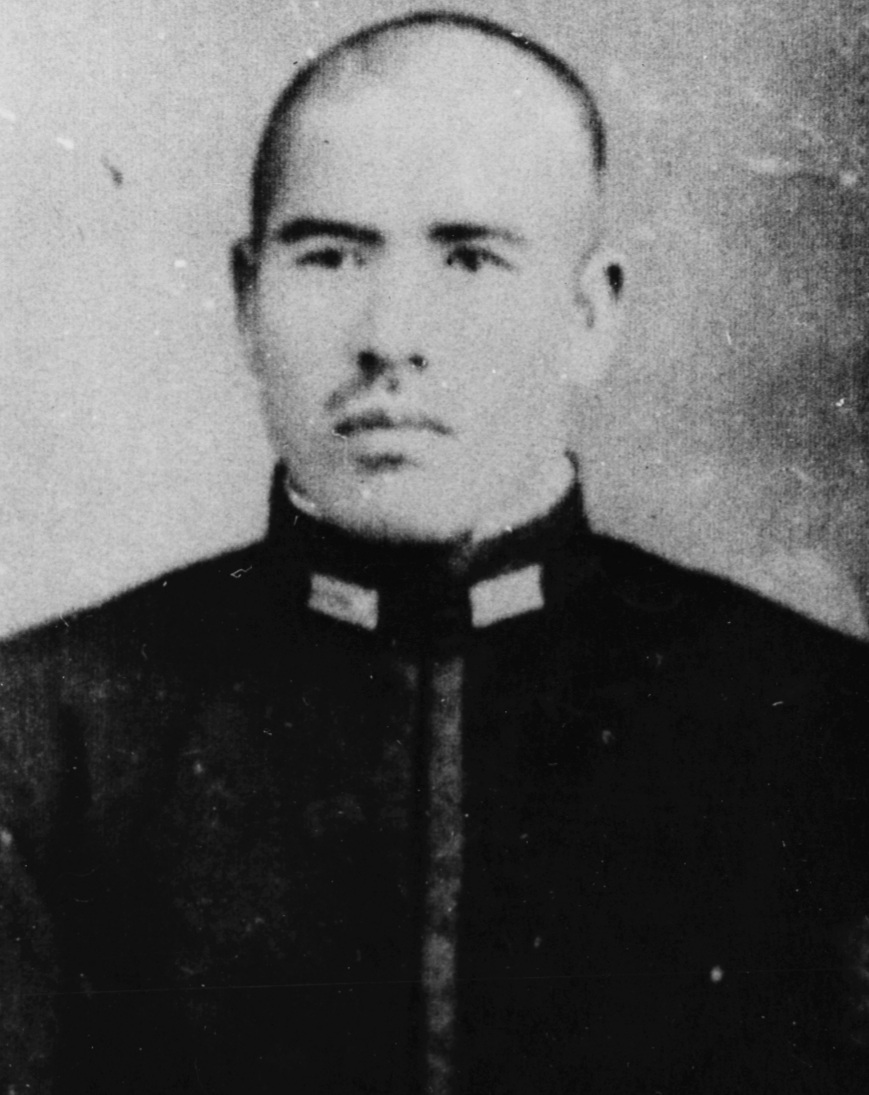
- Born: June 1, 1891; Tochigi Prefecture, Japan
- Died: March 16, 1980 (aged 88)
- Military career
- Allegiance: Empire of Japan
- Branch: Imperial Japanese Navy
- Service years: 1912–1945
- Rank: Vice Admiral
- Commands: Uranami, Ushio, 2nd Destroyer Division, 30th Destroyer Division, 19th Destroyer Division, Sendai, Mikuma, Haruna, 10th Squadron, 11th Destroyer Squadron, Naval Navigation School, Naval Hydrography Bureau
- Conflicts: World War II; Battle of Midway; Guadalcanal Campaign; Battle of Leyte Gulf

Susumu Kimura (木村 進, Kimura Susumu; June 1, 1891 – March 16, 1980), was an admiral in the Imperial Japanese Navy during World War II. He commanded Destroyer Squadron 10 which participated in several important naval battles at the Battle of Midway, Guadalcanal Campaign, and the Battle of Leyte Gulf.

== Biography ==
Kimura was a native of Tochigi prefecture, and graduated 55th out of 144 cadets in the 40th class of the Imperial Japanese Navy Academy in 1912. He served his midshipman duty on the cruiser Azuma and battleship Aki, and as a sub-lieutenant on Tokiwa, repair ship Kantō, and destroyer Shiratsuyu. In 1918, he attended the Navy Staff College, where he specialized in navigation. After graduation as a lieutenant, he served as chief navigator in the coastal patrol ship Matsue and destroyer Amatsukaze, becoming executive officer on Akikaze in December 1920. He continued to serve as chief navigator on a wide variety of warships through the 1920s, becoming lieutenant commander in 1925, and executive officer of the heavy cruiser Myōkō in 1929. Kimura was promoted to commander in 1930.

Kimura's first command was that of the destroyer Uranami in 1933, followed by Ushio later that year. In 1934, he commanded the 2nd Destroyer Division. After a brief stint as executive officer on Iwate in 1935, he commanded the 30th Destroyer Division, followed by the 19th Destroyer Division in 1936. Kimura was then appointed captain of the light cruiser Sendai in 1937, followed by the heavy cruiser Mikuma in 1939 and Haruna in 1940. However, at the time of the attack on Pearl Harbor, Kimura was attached to the Imperial Japanese Navy General Staff.

In May 1942, Kimura was promoted to rear admiral. He commanded the destroyer screening force (Destroyer Squadron 10) at the Battle of Midway, during which time his flagship was the cruiser Nagara. He continued to command Destroyer Squadron 10 into the Guadalcanal Campaign (including the Battle of the Santa Cruz Islands and the Naval Battle of Guadalcanal.) During the Battle of Leyte Gulf he commanded Destroyer Squadron 10 from the light cruiser Yahagi.

In December 1944, Kimura became head of the Naval Navigational School. He was promoted to vice admiral in April 1945. Kimura died in 1980 at the age of 86.
