= Shigeharu Murata =

Japanese World War II pilot

- 村田 重治
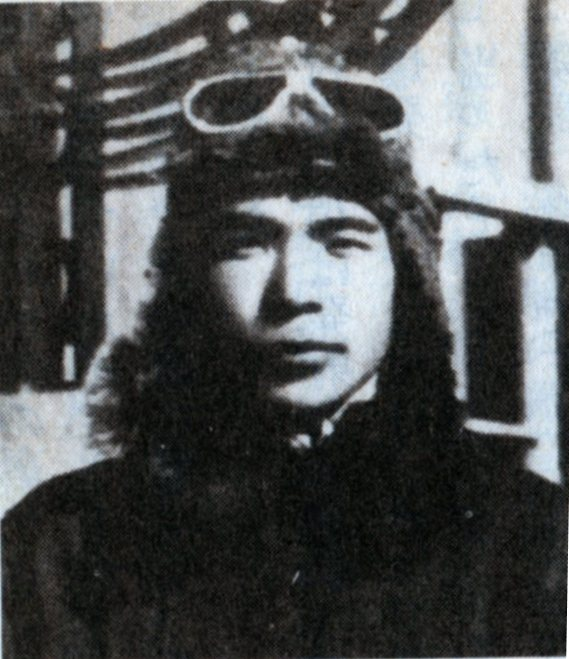
- Born: 9 April 1909; Shimahara, Nagasaki, Japan
- Died: 26 October 1942 (aged 33); Pacific Ocean
- Military career
- Allegiance: Empire of Japan
- Branch: Imperial Japanese Navy Air Service (IJN)
- Service years: 1930–1942
- Rank: Captain
- Nicknames: Gaji; Boots; God of Lightning
- Units: Kaga; 13th Air Group; 12th Air Group; Akagi; Shōkaku
- Conflicts: Second Sino-Japanese War; World War II; Attack on Pearl Harbor; Indian Ocean Raid; Battle of Midway; Solomon Islands Campaign; Battle of the Eastern Solomons; Battle of the Santa Cruz Islands †

Shigeharu Murata (村田 重治, Murata Shigeharu; 9 April 1909 - 26 October 1942) was a torpedo bomber pilot officer in the Imperial Japanese Navy (IJN) during World War II. He was the commander of torpedo bombers in the Attack on Pearl Harbor that crippled several United States Navy (USN) battleships and during the Battle of the Santa Cruz Islands that resulted in the sinking of carrier Hornet, where he was killed in action.

== Early career ==
Shigeharu Murata entered Imperial Japanese Naval Academy in April 1927 and graduated from the 58th class in November 1930. In April 1932, he completed the navy pilot training program at Kasumigaura Air Group and was commissioned as ensign. He was promoted to Lieutenant Junior Grade in November 1933. In July 1934, he was assigned to Tateyama Air Group and in October 1935 to carrier Kaga. In October 1936, he served as an instructor at Kasumigaura Air Group near Tokyo and was promoted to full lieutenant in December. In 1937, he was transferred to the 13th Air Group and flew a Yokosuka B4Y bomber. He participated in the early stages of Second Sino-Japanese War and was also involved in USS Panay incident on 12 December 1937.

In March 1938, Lieutenant Murata was transferred to 12th Air Group and assigned as one of the flight division leaders (Buntaichō). There he participated in strikes on Hankou in Central China. In December, he was transferred to carrier Akagi and became flight division leader (Buntaichō) in the torpedo bomber squadron. In June 1939, he was assigned to Usa Air Group in Ōita Prefecture on Kyushu and in October he began an advanced training course for torpedo attack specialization at Yokosuka Air Group. In November 1940, he was appointed as an instructor at the same Air Group and conducted research on torpedo attack techniques in shallow waters.

== Pacific War ==
In September 1941, Lieutenant Murata was transferred back to Akagi. He was assigned as the torpedo squadron leader (as Hikōtaichō) and was promoted to lieutenant commander. He participated in the Attack on Pearl Harbor, where he commanded the torpedo bombers that crippled Battleship Row. After that, he participated in the Indian Ocean Raid and subsequently in the Battle of Midway. He was on board Akagi when the bomb released by Lieutenant Dick Best hit the carrier and set it afire.

In July 1942, Lieutenant Commander Murata was transferred to the carrier Shōkaku and was assigned as its torpedo bomber squadron leader (as Hikōtaichō). In late August 1942, he participated in the Battle of the Eastern Solomons, however, he did not see any action. For this battle, Vice Admiral Chuichi Nagumo had decided to hold the Nakajima B5N torpedo bombers in reserve, while allocating two waves of Aichi D3A dive bombers to soften up the enemy fleet beforehand. The dive bomber strikes, under Lieutenant Commander Mamoru Seki (Shōkaku) and Lieutenant Sadamu Takahashi (Zuikaku) respectively, were launched late in the afternoon, leaving little possibility of launching the torpedo bombers.

In late October 1942, Lieutenant Commander Murata participated in the Battle of the Santa Cruz Islands, where he commanded the first strike wave that consisted of 21 D3A dive bombers, 20 B5N torpedo bombers and 21 A6M Zero fighters. The dive bombers were led by Lieutenant Sadamu Takahashi from Zuikaku, while four escorting Shōkaku fighters were led by Lieutenant Hisayoshi Miyajima, eight from Zuikaku by Lieutenant Ayao Shirane and nine from Zuihō by Lieutenant Moriyasu Hidaka. On the way, the IJN strike force encountered a USN strike force on a reciprocal course. At that point, Lieutenant Hidaka and his nine Zeros abandoned the escort duty and attacked the USN aircraft. When the rest of the strike force approached the USN fleet, Murata led an extremely well-coordinated torpedo and dive-bombing attack that achieved three bomb and two torpedo hits on the carrier Hornet. The torpedo released by Murata appeared to have been among the two that hit the carrier. However, during the attack, Murata's B5N was hit by anti-aircraft artillery and went down in flames. Murata was one of the many experienced carrier pilots lost in the battle; these included his academy classmate, Lieutenant Commander Mamoru Seki, who led the second wave strike that damaged Enterprise.

Murata was posthumously promoted by two ranks to captain and received a special individual citation from the IJN.

== Portrayal in media ==
Shigeharu Murata appeared in the 1970 film Tora! Tora! Tora! and was portrayed by Japanese actor Toshio Hosokawa (細川 俊夫).
