= Mamoru Seki =

Japanese Navy Officer

- 関 衛
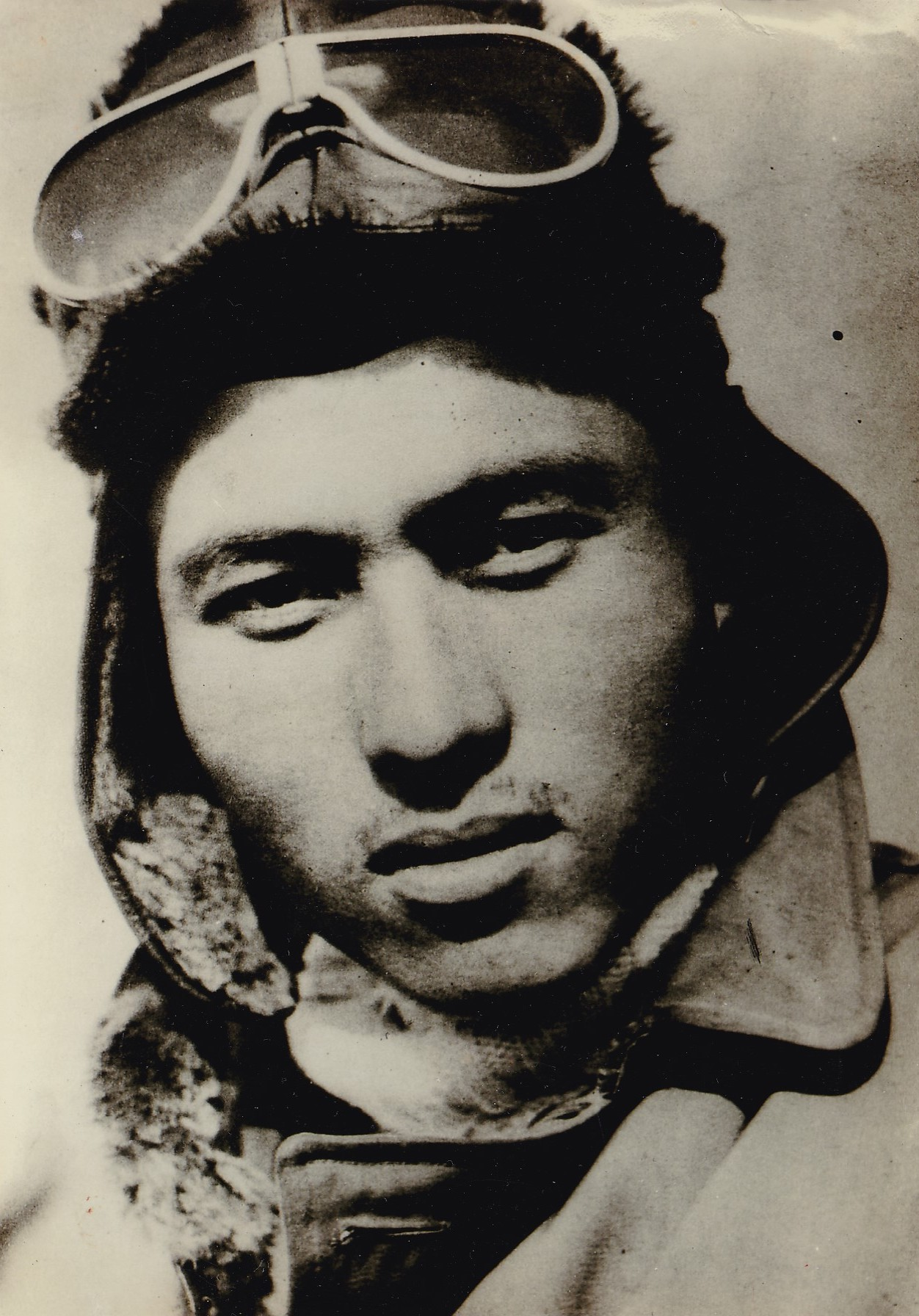
- Born: 8 March 1909; Yonezawa, Yamagata, Empire of Japan
- Died: 26 October 1942 (aged 33); Santa Cruz Islands
- Military career
- Allegiance: Empire of Japan
- Branch: Imperial Japanese Navy Air Service (IJN)
- Service years: 1930–1942
- Rank: Commander
- Units: Ryūjō; Shōkaku
- Conflicts: Second Sino-Japanese War; World War II; Battle of the Eastern Solomons; Battle of the Santa Cruz Islands; Solomon Islands Campaign

Mamoru Seki (関 衛, Seki Mamoru; March 8, 1909 – October 26, 1942) was a dive bomber pilot and officer in the Imperial Japanese Navy (IJN) during World War II. He is best known for being the commander of the dive bomber squadron of carrier Shōkaku and for leading strikes against United States Navy (USN) carriers in both Battle of the Eastern Solomons and Battle of the Santa Cruz Islands, where they severely damaged Enterprise on two occasions. He was killed in action during the Battle of the Santa Cruz Islands.

== Early career ==
Mamoru Seki came from a military family; his father was a captain in IJN and participated in Battle of Tsushima, while his uncle on his mother's side was Vice Admiral Sakonji Seizō.

He enrolled in the Imperial Japanese Naval Academy in 1926 and graduated from the 58th class in November 1930. In April 1932, he was commissioned as ensign. In 1933, he was selected for the navy pilot training program at Tateyama Air Group. He became one of the first pilots in IJN that specialized in dive bombing and conducted pioneering research and development of dive-bombing techniques. After that, he served as an instructor at Kasumigaura Air Group near Tokyo.

Later on, Seki became a flight division leader (Buntaichō) in the dive bomber squadron of carrier Ryūjō and participated in Canton Operation during the Second Sino-Japanese War in 1938. In October 1941, he was promoted to lieutenant commander. He was then transferred to Usa Air Group in Ōita Prefecture on Kyushu and served as an instructor when the Pacific War started.

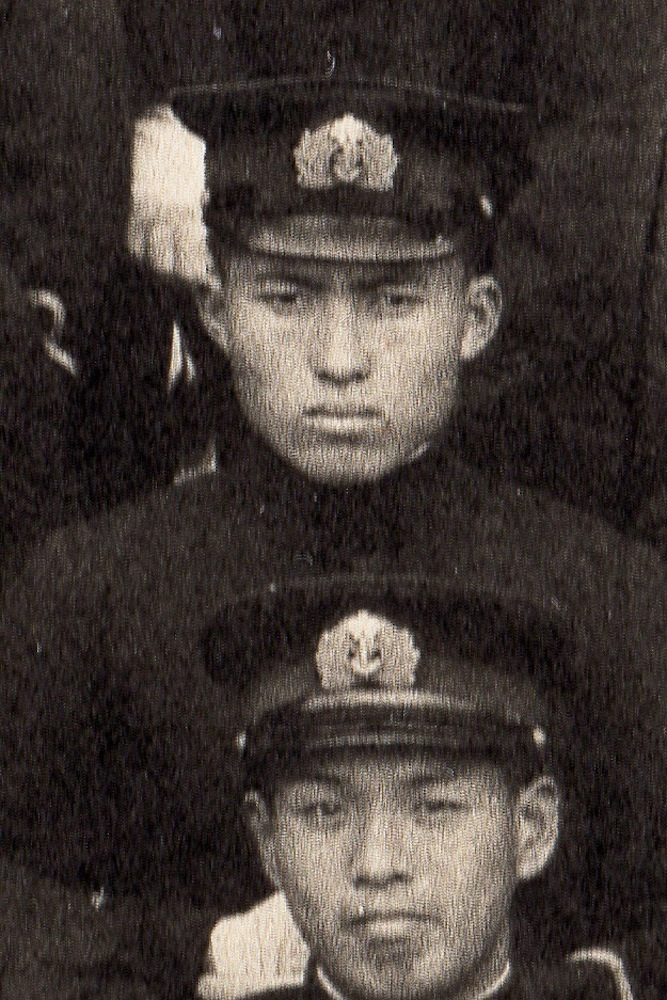
Mamoru Seki in a group photo.

== Pacific War ==
In July 1942, Lieutenant Commander Seki was transferred to the carrier Shōkaku as its group commander (Hikōtaichō), as well as its dive bomber squadron leader. In late August 1942, he participated in the Battle of the Eastern Solomons. There he led the first strike wave against the USN carriers that consisted of 27 Aichi D3A dive bombers and 15 Mitsubishi A6M Zero fighters. Lieutenant Keiichi Arima led one of the three flight divisions (chūtai) within his strike force, while fighter escorts were led by Lieutenant Yasuhiro Shigematsu from Shōkaku and Lieutenant Moriyasu Hidaka from Zuikaku. Seki's strike hit Enterprise with three bombs that severely damaged the carrier. The second strike wave, led by Lieutenant Sadamu Takahashi of Zuikaku, failed to locate the enemy carriers and therefore missed the opportunity to finish off Enterprise.

In late October 1942, Shōkaku participated in the Battle of the Santa Cruz Islands, where Lieutenant Commander Seki led the second strike wave that consisted of 19 Aichi D3A dive bombers, 16 Nakajima B5N torpedo bombers and nine A6M Zero fighters. Like in the Battle of the Eastern Solomons, one of the three flight divisions (chūtai) within his strike force was led by Lieutenant Arima. The Zero fighter escort was led by Lieutenant Hideki Shingō, who was the fighter squadron leader of Shōkaku. Seki's strike hit Enterprise with two bombs and scored one near-miss with another bomb that caused severe damage to the carrier. However, during the attack, Lieutenant Commander Seki was hit by anti-aircraft artillery and his D3A caught fire and disintegrated. His bomb missed Enterprise and landed in the water close to the side of the carrier.

He was one of many experienced carrier pilots lost in the battle; among them was his academy classmate Lieutenant Commander Shigeharu Murata, who led the first wave strike that crippled Hornet. He was posthumously promoted to commander.
