= Buntaichō =

Imperial Japanese Navy position

Buntaichō (分隊長) was a naval aviation position in the Imperial Japanese Navy Air Service (IJNAS), normally held by a Lieutenant, who commanded a division of flight personnel (buntai) in an air group.

== Administrative role ==
On the ground, the Buntaichō commanded a division of flight personnel, called buntai (分隊), which was the smallest administrative unit in IJNAS. Buntai was made up of the required number of personnel necessary to fly one chūtai (中隊), which typically consisted of nine aircraft. For example, in bomber units, there were much more personnel than the aircraft.

On an aircraft carrier, the air group typically consisted of three squadrons, where each was related to a specific aircraft type (i.e., either dive bomber, torpedo bomber or fighter). The senior Buntaichō commanded all flight personnel of a specific squadron in addition to its first division, while the other two junior Buntaichōs commanded the second and the third division (depending on how many divisions were in a squadron). On a light carrier, there might have been just one Buntaichō in the squadron.

Buntaichō was one of the two flight command ratings in the naval air hierarchy, the other being the Hikōtaichō (飛行隊長), who commanded a unit that was composed of all flight personnel in the air group, called hikōtai (飛行隊), which was made up of several buntais.

== Combat role ==
In flight, each Buntaichō commanded a division of nine aircraft, called chūtai. Note that buntai referred to a division of flight personnel, while chūtai referred to an aircraft formation that was piloted by that personnel. Therefore, in flight, Buntaichō was referred to as Chūtaichō (中隊長).

If the Hikōtaichō was flying the same aircraft type as the Buntaichō, he usually commanded the whole strike force, while the Buntaichō commanded one of the chūtais. For example, both during the Battle of the Eastern Solomons and the Battle of the Santa Cruz Islands, Lieutenant Commander Mamoru Seki (Shōkaku Hikōtaichō) commanded the strike force, while Lieutenant Keiichi Arima (Shōkaku dive bomber Buntaichō) commanded one of the dive bomber chūtais.

The Buntaichō was not necessary a pilot. For example, Lieutenant Keiichi Arima was an observer; his Aichi D3A dive bomber was piloted by Petty Officer First Class Kiyoto Furuta. In land-based bomber units, Buntaichō was often in the observer seat.

== Aircraft marking ==
In carrier-based units, the position of Buntaichō was marked by two horizontal stripes on the tail of an aircraft. However, this marking should not be confused with the vertical stripes around the rear of the fuselage, which indicated the carrier to which the aircraft belonged.

== See also ==
- Hikōtaichō
