= Keiichi Arima =

Former Imperial Japanese Navy (IJN) dive bomber

- 有馬 敬一
- Born: April 26, 1916; Tokyo, Japan
- Died: March 29, 1998 (aged 81); Tokyo, Japan
- Military career
- Allegiance: Empire of Japan
- Branch: Imperial Japanese Navy Air Service (IJN)
- Service years: 1932–1951
- Rank: Lieutenant commander
- Units: 12th Air Group; Sōryū; Shōkaku
- Conflicts: Second Sino-Japanese War; World War II; Battle of the Eastern Solomons; Battle of the Santa Cruz Islands; Solomon Islands Campaign

Keiichi Arima (有馬 敬一, Arima Keiichi; , January 24, 1909 – March 29, 1998) was a non-aviator dive bomber officer in the Imperial Japanese Navy (IJN) during World War II. He participated in Central China campaigns and later led Aichi D3A dive bombers from carrier Shōkaku in both carrier battles during Solomon Islands Campaign, where he and his pilot, Kiyoto Furuta, scored bomb hits on United States Navy (USN) carrier Enterprise on two occasions.

== Early career ==
Keiichi Arima enrolled in the Imperial Japanese Naval Academy in April 1933 and graduated from the 64th class in March 1937. He received his commission as an ensign in March 1938. In August of the same year he was sent for the navy pilot training program to Kasumigaura Air Group near Tokyo and completed it in March 1939. He then was chosen for advanced aerial training courses at Yokosuka Air Group near Tokyo and Saiki Air Group on Kyushu, where he specialized in aerial reconnaissance. He was promoted to lieutenant junior grade in June 1939.

In October 1939, he was assigned as a junior flight division leader (junior buntaichō) to the 12th Air Group, which was stationed in Central China. His unit flew Aichi D1A dive bombers out of the bases in Anqing, Jiujiang, and Hankou to support ground operations in the area. In May 1940, the unit switched to the new Aichi D3A dive bombers and participated in the capture of Yichang. Lieutenant Arima frequently attacked the supply shipping on Yangtze west of Yichang, which was particularly challenging for dive bombing as the Gorges can have more than 1000 meters cliffs on both sides. In September, he started to fly missions against Chongqing, which was the capital of the Chinese Nationalists at that time.

Lieutenant Arima was transferred to the carrier Sōryū in November 1940 and was assigned as a junior division leader (junior buntaichō) of the dive-bomber squadron. He was promoted to full lieutenant in May 1941. In August, he was reassigned to Suzuka Air Group in Mie Prefecture, where he served as an instructor when Empire of Japan entered the war with United States of America.

== Pacific War ==
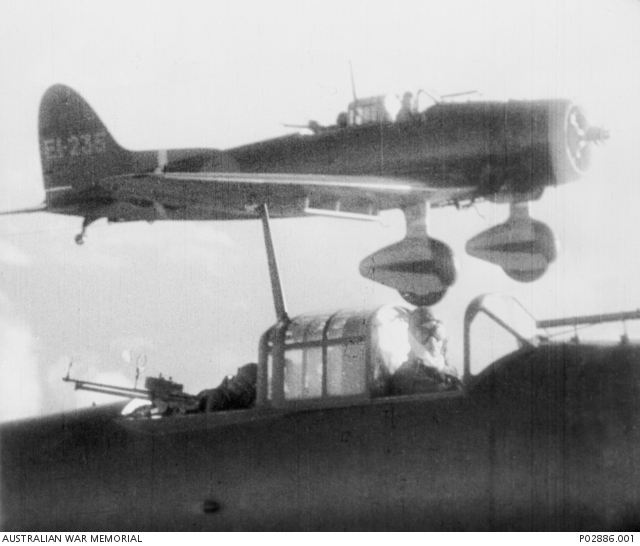
Two Japanese "Val" (Type 99) dive-bombers from Shokaku. Photograph by Arima Keiichi.

In June 1942, Lieutenant Arima was transferred to the carrier Shōkaku and was assigned as a senior flight division leader (senior buntaichō) of the dive-bomber squadron.

In late August 1942 Shōkaku participated in the Battle of the Eastern Solomons. During the attack on the US carriers, Lieutenant Arima was part of Lieutenant Commander Mamoru Seki's first strike wave, consisting of 27 D3A dive bombers and 10 A6M Zero fighters. Arima led one of the three divisions (chūtai), with nine dive bombers under his command. He was in the observer seat of D3A, while his aircraft was piloted by Petty Officer First Class Kiyoto Furuta. The USN Combat Air Patrol (CAP) of Grumman F4F Wildcat fighters intercepted the formation of dive bombers, however, Arima's division managed to escape into cumulonimbus clouds and approached the carrier Enterprise unharmed. The division then made a dive-bombing attack on Enterprise and released their bombs around an altitude of 500 meters. They scored three hits, with Arima's being the first. His 250 kilogram semi-AP bomb penetrated the starboard forward corner of her number 3 elevator aft and sliced through to the third deck before detonating in the chief's quarters. After the attack, Arima remained north-west of the burning Enterprise to wait for the friendly Zero fighters in order to lead them back to the Japanese carriers. However, he encountered several US aircraft that started to case his D3A. He and his pilot evaded the attackers by flying very close to the sea surface and eventually made it back to Shōkaku after sunset.

In late October 1942, Shōkaku was again dispatched to the Solomon Islands to support the Imperial Japanese Army ground assault on Henderson Field on Guadalcanal. During the Battle of the Santa Cruz Islands, Lieutenant Arima's division was part of the second strike wave that consisted of 19 D3A dive bombers and 5 A6M Zero fighters, again commanded by Lieutenant Commander Seki. The Zero fighters were led by Lieutenant Hideki Shingō, the fighter squadron leader of Shōkaku. Arima and his pilot attacked Enterprise from astern and released the bomb at an altitude of between 450 and 500 meters and scored a hit. Their 250-kilogram semi-AP bomb penetrated the center of the flight deck, around six meters from the forward edge, and detonated inside the carrier, causing fires. They did not encounter any CAP on the way out and they climbed to 6000 meters, where Arima observed dense smoke coming from Enterprise. Despite the successful attack, it came at a heavy price, as Lieutenant Commander Seki was killed. As a simultaneous USN strike damaged the flight deck of Shōkaku, leaving her unable to launch or recover aircraft, Arima's D3A landed on Zuikaku.

== Later career ==
After the Battle of the Santa Cruz Islands, Lieutenant Arima was transferred to Usa Air Group in Ōita Prefecture on Kyushu and served as an instructor (together with his pilot Petty Officer Furuta). He was then transferred to Yokosuka Air Group, where he served as a flight commander (Hikōtaichō). There he was involved in developing communication equipment and radar, and provided instructions on the developed hardware. In October 1944, he was promoted to lieutenant commander. He survived the war.
