= Organization of the Imperial Japanese Navy Air Service =

The Imperial Japanese Navy Air Service was under the control of the Navy Aviation Bureau (Kaigun Kōkū Hombu) .

== Administrative organizations ==
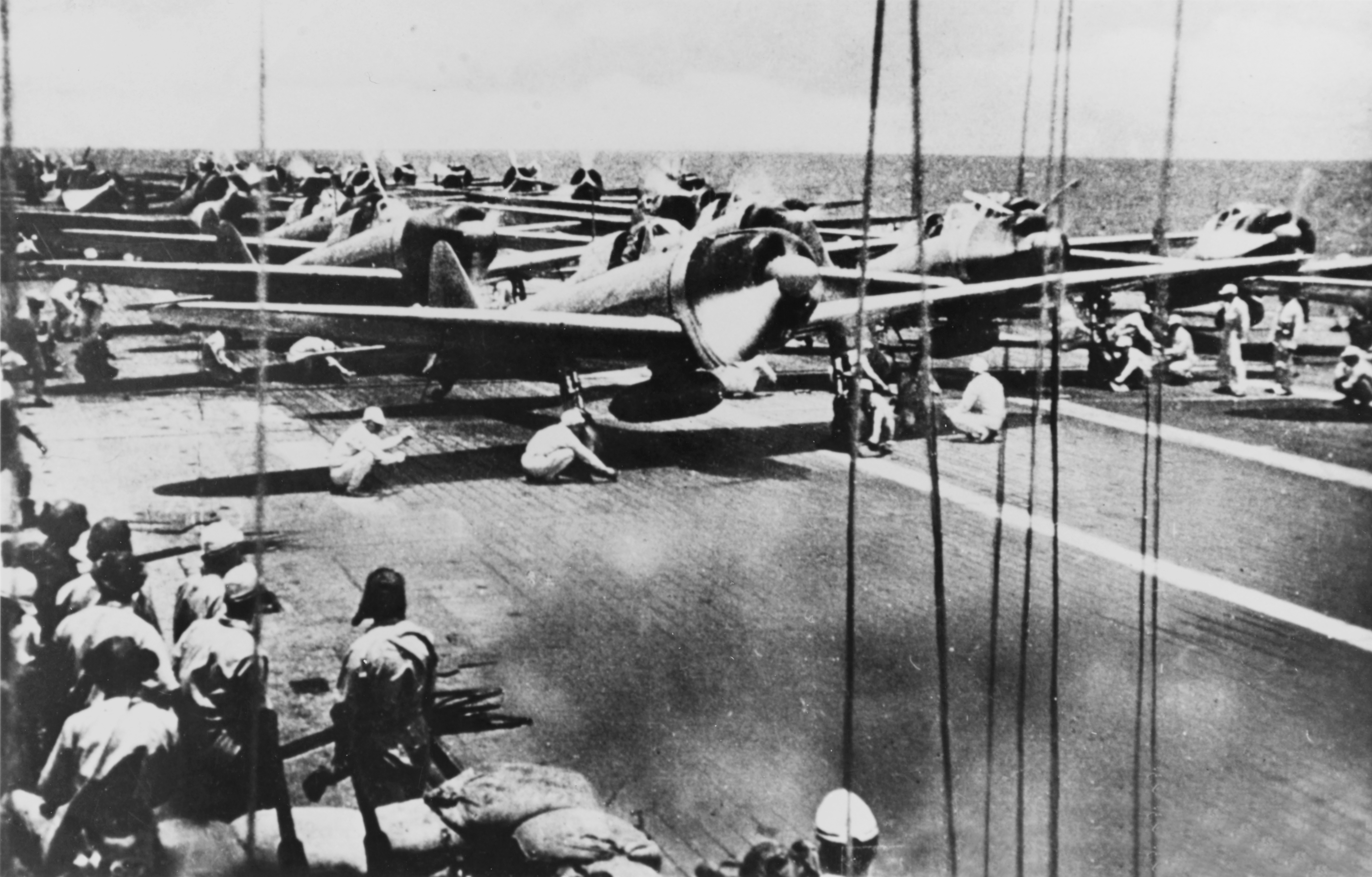
Mitsubishi A6M2 "Zero" Model 21 on the flight deck of carrier Shokaku, 26 October 1942, Battle of the Santa Cruz Islands.

=== Kōkū Kantai ===
Kōkū Kantai (air fleet) contained one or more kōkū sentai. The most notable kōkū kantai was the First Air Fleet containing Japan's six fleet carriers and was responsible for the attack on Pearl Harbor. IJN also maintained a land-based system of naval air fleets and area air fleets called homen kantai containing mostly twin-engine bombers and seaplanes.

=== Kōkū Sentai ===
Kōku Sentai (air flotillas) consisted of two or more Kōkūtai, they were commanded by Rear Admirals. Kōkū sentai contained anywhere from a handful to 80 or 90 aircraft, and were dependent on both the mission and type of aircraft carrier or air station that they were located on. A kōku sentai was equivalent to a carrier division and contained all carrier aircraft within the division. The first kōku sentai, in December 1941, consisted of all aircraft aboard the carriers Akagi and Kaga. While the land-based kōku sentai consisted of 3 kokutais.

=== Kōkūtai ===
Kōkūtai (air group) was equivalent to a United States group or Commonwealth wing. A kōkūtai in the broadest terms could comprise a flight and base element of either a carrier or land-based air group. In terms of the flight element, it was generally composed of 18 to 27 aircraft and took the name of the carrier or air station where it was originally formed. It could also be either homogeneous or composed of different types of aircraft. The land-based units had larger numbers of aircraft, and could number from approximately 24 to a 100 or more aircraft. They were more homogeneous and came under the command of the naval district where their home naval air station was located in, and later were designated either by a number or by the name of that particular station. There were over 90 naval air groups at the start of the Pacific War.

Kōkūtai was led by its Commander (Shirei) and its Air Officer (Hikōchō), where the latter typically had the role of executive officer. The flight element of kōkūtai was called hikōtai and was led by Hikōtaichō. The non-flight element of kōkūtai was composed of ground units that provided aircraft maintenance and air base service functions.

The land-based Kōkūtai system was set up in 1916, determined that naval air stations and air groups would be organized as needed, at either naval ports (gunkō) or strategic ports (yōkō). Their designations were taken from the names of those places and functioning under the authority of those stations. The air groups and stations outside those ports were placed under the command of the nearest naval base (chinjufu). From the establishment of the IJN's first land-based air unit at Yokosuka until the end of the Pacific war, the term kōkūtai meant both a naval air station and the flying unit that was stationed there. The flying unit (Hikōkitai or hikōtai) operated the aircraft, and the rest of the personnel of any Kōkūtai operated and maintained the ground facilities of the station at which the unit was stationed. Just as the aircraft and flight crew on board a Japanese carrier or a seaplane tender were made an integral part of a ships complement, when land-based or shore-based (seaplane) air units were formed, the bases at which they were stationed were seen as equivalent of the ships of the carrier-based hikōtai formed a part of.

In 1919, the IJN set out new regulations that in a time of war, emergency or maneuvers provided for the organization of "special air groups" (tōkusetsu kōkūtai), which could be designated either by a place or by a numerical designation. They could be either land- or carrier-based, but in general they were largely land-based and would be given numerical designations. In most cases the bases of these formations were created from elements drawn from existing air groups. The first such unit was the 11th Air Group, established briefly in 1936. While regulations establishing land-based air groups were set forth in 1916 and 1919, it was not until the early 1930s that a series of regulations and instructions set forth the specific internal organizations of air groups, their locations, functions, and their training, though these changed from time to time right up to the end of the Pacific War.

In November 1936, the IJN arranged for the organization of special combined air groups (tōkusetsu rengō kōkūtai), which were composed of two or more air groups. They were created in order to provide greater air strength under a single command. The 1st and 2nd combined air groups were formed in July 1937, at the beginning of the China War, and were the backbone of the navy's air operations in the first several years of that conflict. Standing combined air groups (jōsetsu rengō kōkutai), intended to be more permanent, were established in December 1938. Two of these were established before the Pacific War: the 11th was organized in December 1938, and the 12th was formed in 1939. Until the very end of the 1930s most kōkutai were composed of a mix of aircraft types, with seaplanes predominating initially, but with carrier-type fighters, dive bombers, and torpedo bombers increasing in numbers, along with land-based twin engined medium bombers. However, by 1941 the IJN's land-based air groups were almost always composed of one type of aircraft, the exception was the Chitose air group which was based in Micronesia and was composed of both medium bombers and fighters. On November 1, 1942, all land-based identified with base names were given numerical designations.

As the war in the Pacific progressed, this structure lacked flexibility and hampered front-line operations, consequently, in March 1944 the IJN's land-based air forces were restructured, and certain hikōtai were given independent numerical designations and an identity of their own outside the parent Kōkūtai.

=== Hikōtai ===
Hikōtai was a flight echelon of a carrier or a land-based kōkūtai. It was commanded by a Hikōtaichō and consisted of all flight personnel of kōkūtai (the rest of kōkūtai was composed of ground echelons that provided aircraft maintenance and air base service functions). Hikōtai was divided into several smaller divisions, called buntai.

=== Buntai ===
Buntai was the smallest administrative unit of aviation personnel, as opposed to tactical or operational formations of aircraft. It was commanded by a Buntaichō and was made up of the required number of personnel necessary to fly and maintain one chutai, which typically consisted nine aircraft. The number of personnel in a buntai would vary, depending on the mission or role of the unit and type of aircraft that it operated. Although the terms buntai and chutai were used interchangeably by naval aviators, buntai referred to the personnel while chuntai referred to the aircraft or tactical formation in the air.

== Tactical and Operational Formations ==
=== Hikōkitai ===
Hikōkitai (flying units) were a flight echelon of a carrier that took the name of the carrier on which it was on i.e. Akagi Hikōkitai.

=== Daitai, Chūtai, Shōtai ===
A Daitai consisted of 18 aircraft. A Chūtai consisted of 9 aircraft while a Shōtai has 3 aircraft

== Naval air group identification ==
Before 31 October 1942

- Place name; Standing air group (常設航空隊, Jōsetsu-Kōkūtai).
- Numbered name; Special setting air group (特設航空隊, Tokusetsu-Kōkūtai).

After 1 November 1942

- Numbered name; Category 'A' air group (甲航空隊, Kō Kōkūtai) as combatant unit.
  - Example
    - 12th Kōkūtai is Training (bomber) group.
    - 121st Kōkūtai is reconnaissance aircraft group.
    - 762nd Kōkūtai is land-based torpedo bomber group.
    - 1081st Kōkūtai is military airlift group.
  - Regulation table

| Value | Hundred's digit (classification) | Ten's digit (competent authorities) | One's digit |
|---|---|---|---|
| 0 or absent | Training group | Yokosuka Naval District | Odd number is standing air group. Even number is special setting air group. |
| 1 | Reconnaissance aircraft group | Yokosuka Naval District | Odd number is standing air group. Even number is special setting air group. |
| 2 | Fighter group (carrier fighter) | Yokosuka Naval District | Odd number is standing air group. Even number is special setting air group. |
| 3 | Fighter group (interceptor fighter) | Kure Naval District | Odd number is standing air group. Even number is special setting air group. |
| 4 | Float reconnaissance aircraft group | Kure Naval District | Odd number is standing air group. Even number is special setting air group. |
| 5 | Carrier dive bomber group, carrier torpedo bomber group | Sasebo Naval District | Odd number is standing air group. Even number is special setting air group. |
| 6 | Carrier air group, submarine-launched floatplane group | Sasebo Naval District | Odd number is standing air group. Even number is special setting air group. |
| 7 | Land-based bomber group, land-based attack bomber group | Sasebo Naval District | Odd number is standing air group. Even number is special setting air group. |
| 8 | Flying boat group | Maizuru Naval District | Odd number is standing air group. Even number is special setting air group. |
| 9 | Maritime patrol aircraft (Maritime Escort) group | Maizuru Naval District | Odd number is standing air group. Even number is special setting air group. |
| 10 | Military airlift group | Maizuru Naval District | Odd number is standing air group. Even number is special setting air group. |

- Place name; Category 'A' air group as training unit, evaluation unit.
  - Example
    - Atsugi Kōkūtai
    - Kasumigaura Kōkūtai
    - Takuma Kōkūtai
    - Yokosuka Kōkutai
- Region name; Category 'B' air group (乙航空隊, Otsu Kōkūtai) as air base guard unit.
  - Example
    - Kantō Kōkutai
    - Mariana Kōkutai
    - Hitō Kōkutai

=== Squadron identification ===
After 1 March 1944

Regulation table
| Classification | Squadron number | Aircraft type (role) |
|---|---|---|
| Fighter Squadron (戦闘飛行隊 Sentō Hikōtai) | 1–400 | Type 'A' Fighter or carrier fighter (甲戦 Kōsen) |
| Fighter Squadron (戦闘飛行隊 Sentō Hikōtai) | 401–800 | Type 'B' Fighter (乙戦 Otsusen, interceptor fighter) |
| Fighter Squadron (戦闘飛行隊 Sentō Hikōtai) | 801–1000 | Type 'C' Fighter (丙戦 Heisen, night fighter) |
| Attack Squadron (攻撃飛行隊 Kōgeki Hikōtai) | 1–200 | Carrier dive-bomber |
| Attack Squadron (攻撃飛行隊 Kōgeki Hikōtai) | 201–400 | Carrier attack-bomber |
| Attack Squadron (攻撃飛行隊 Kōgeki Hikōtai) | 401–600 | Land-based bomber |
| Attack Squadron (攻撃飛行隊 Kōgeki Hikōtai) | 601–800 | Land-based attack-bomber |
| Reconnaissance Squadron (偵察飛行隊 Teisatsu Hikōtai) | 1–200 | Reconnaissance aircraft |
| Reconnaissance Squadron (偵察飛行隊 Teisatsu Hikōtai) | 201–300 | Flying boat |
| Reconnaissance Squadron (偵察飛行隊 Teisatsu Hikōtai) | 301–600 | Reconnaissance seaplane |
| Reconnaissance Squadron (偵察飛行隊 Teisatsu Hikōtai) | 601–800 | (missing number) |
| Reconnaissance Squadron (偵察飛行隊 Teisatsu Hikōtai) | 801–1000 | Maritime patrol aircraft |
| Transport Squadron (挺進飛行隊 Teishin Hikōtai) | 1–100 | Transport |

== Naval aircraft identification System ==
The IJN had, at the beginning of the Pacific War, three aircraft designation systems: The Experimental Shi (試)numbers, the Type numbering system and an aircraft designation system broadly similar to that used by the U.S. Navy from 1922 until 1962.

Each new design was first given an experimental Shi number, based upon the current Japanese imperial year of reign. The Mitsubishi A6M Zero so started its career as "Navy Experimental 12-Shi Carrier Fighter" (海軍十二試艦上戦闘機).

Upon entering production the aircraft was given a Type number. The 'Zero' was so fully known as "Navy Type 0 Carrier Fighter" (海軍零式艦上戦闘機), as the Zero was accepted in 1940, or 2600 in the Japanese calendar.

The aircraft was also given a "short designation" consisting of a group of Roman letters and numbers.

- The first letter (sometimes two) indicated the basic type or purpose of the aircraft.
- Second came a series number indicating the number of major sub-types produced for that type of aircraft. (Unlike USN practice, the digit "1" was not ignored in this system and was included.)
- Third was the second letter which was the manufacturer's code, and included some non-Japanese companies.

(G4M designated attack bomber (G), the fourth in the Navy's sequence, designed or produced by Mitsubishi, while G5N would be the next attack bomber in sequence, built by Nakajima.)

- Fourth was a number indicating the version of the aircraft.

The first production version of the 'Zero' thus became "A6M1".

Japanese Navy Air Service short designation system, data from
| Letter | Type | Manufacturer |
|---|---|---|
| A | Carrier fighter | Aichi (Aichi Tokei Denki and Aichi Kokuki)/North American Aviation (US) |
| B | Carrier Attack Bomber (Torpedo or level bomber) | Boeing Aircraft (US) |
| C | Carrier reconnaissance | Consolidated Aircraft (US) |
| D | Carrier Bomber (Dive Bomber) | Douglas Aircraft Company (US) |
| E | Reconnaissance seaplane | - |
| F | Observation seaplane | - |
| G | Attack Bomber (land based) | Hitachi Kokuki/Grumman Aircraft Engineering (US) |
| H | Flying Boat (Reconnaissance) | Hiro (Dai-Juichi Kaigun Koskusho)/Hawker Aircraft (UK) |
| He | - | Ernst Heinkel Flugzeugwerke (Germany) |
| J | Land-based fighter | Nihon Kogata Hikoki/, Junkers Flugzeug und Moterenwerke (Germany) |
| K | Trainer | Kawanishi Kokuki |
| L | Transport | - |
| M | Special floatplane | Mitsubishi Jukogyo |
| MX | Special Purpose Aircraft | - |
| N | Float Fighter | Nakajima Hikoki |
| P | Bomber (land based) | Nihon Hikoki |
| Q | Patrol (Anti-Submarine Warfare) | - |
| R | Land-based reconnaissance | - |
| S | Nightfighter | Sasebo (Dai-Nijuichi Kaigun Kokusho) |
| Si | - | Showa Hikoki |
| V | - | Vought-Sikorsky (US) |
| W | - | Watanabe Tekkosho/Kyushu Hikoki |
| Y | - | Yokosuka (Dai-Ichi Kaigun Koku Gijitsusho) |
| Z | - | Mizuno Guraida Seisakusho |

Further minor changes were indicated by adding letters after the subtype number as in the Type/Model scheme above. The first two letters and the series number remained the same for the service life of each design.

In a few cases, when the designed role of an aircraft changed, the new use was indicated by adding a dash and a second type letter to the end of the existing short designation (e.g., the H6K4 was the sixth flying boat (H6) designed by Kawanishi (K), fourth version of that design (4). When the plane was equipped primarily as a troop or supply transport, its designation was H6K4-L.)
