= Imperial Japanese Navy Aviation Bureau =

The Imperial Japanese Navy Aviation Bureau (海軍航空本部, Kaigun Kōkū Hombu) of the Ministry of the Navy of Japan was responsible for the development and training of the Imperial Japanese Navy Air Service. In 1941 it was headed by Vice-Admiral Eikichi Katagiri and was organized as follows:

- General Affairs Department
- Air Naval Intelligence Department
- Land Based Airfield Engineering Department
- Training Department - ensured that qualified personnel were sent to the Combined Air Training Command at Kasumigara.
- Technical Department - Designed new aircraft and equipment plus was responsible for the storage and repair of aircraft at Naval Air Arsenals
  - Aomori
  - Koza
  - Hiro
  - Omura or Sasebo
  - Kanoya
  - Kasumigara
  - Yokosuka

== Navy Training Schools and Units ==
Training for the IJNAS are conducted under training unit led directly by the Naval Air Bureau. Such unit could either be an actual combat air group(Kōkūtai) or a proper training unit. For training pilot for carrier operation, light carriers are employed.

Such schools and units was named after the place where they were established (cities, towns or Arsenal/Base), or with the carrier name if it is a carrier based unit. A numbering system is also used.

For example, the 12th combined air group(training) based at Kure consist of the Ōita, Usa, Hakata and Ōmura training air group.

Navy training units by name

- Oppama
- Chitose
- Genzan
- Tainan
- Tokushima
- Konoike
- Ōita
- Ōmura
- Tsukuba
- Yokosuka
- Hyakuri
- Kasumigaura
- Tsuikui
- Kuiko
- Shanghai
- Suzuka
- Tsuchiura
- Kaminoike

Training Carriers

- Hōshō
- Ryūhō

== See also ==
- List of Imperial Japanese Navy Air Force Service personnel (WWII)
- Organization of the Imperial Japanese Navy Air Service
