= Hikōtaichō =

Imperial Japanese Navy position

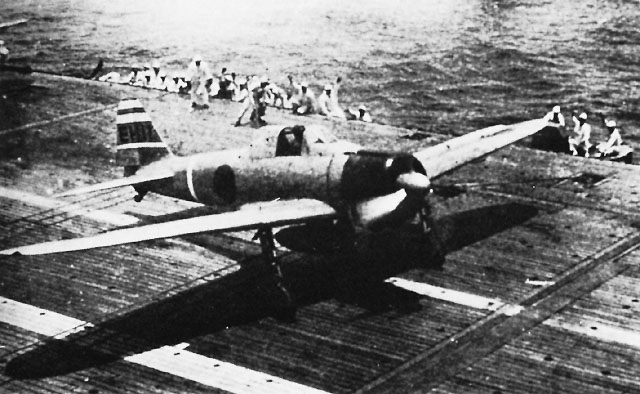
Aircraft flown by Lieutenant Hideki Shingō (Shōkaku fighter Hikōtaichō) taking off from carrier Shōkaku during the Battle of the Santa Cruz Islands. Notice the three horizontal stripes on the tail of the aircraft that indicate Hikōtaichō position.

Hikōtaichō (飛行隊長) was a senior naval aviation position in the Imperial Japanese Navy Air Service, normally held by a Lieutenant Commander or a very senior Lieutenant, who commanded all flight personnel in an air group.

== Administrative role ==
On the ground, the Hikōtaichō commanded a unit called hikōtai (飛行隊), which was composed of all flight personnel in an air group, called kōkūtai (航空隊). However, Hikōtaichō was not the commander of the whole air group (kōkūtai), which also included non-flight personnel that provided aircraft maintenance and air base service functions.

On an aircraft carrier, the hikōtai typically consisted of three squadrons, where each was related to a specific aircraft type (i.e., either dive bomber, torpedo bomber or fighter). The Hikōtaichō was one of the two flight command ratings in the naval air hierarchy, the other being the Buntaichō (分隊長), who commanded a division of flight personnel for a specific aircraft type, called buntai (分隊).

== Combat role ==
During the combat, the Hikōtaichō commanded a strike force composed of all aircraft types. According to Imperial Japanese Navy doctrine, the carriers operated in pairs and each carrier contributed a different aircraft type to a particular strike wave, where one Hikōtaichō commanded the first wave, while the other Hikōtaichō commanded the second wave. For example, during the Battle of the Santa Cruz Islands, the first strike wave against the United States Navy carriers was commanded by Lieutenant Commander Shigeharu Murata (Shōkaku Hikōtaichō), where Shōkaku contributed Nakajima B5N torpedo bombers and Zuikaku contributed Aichi D3A dive bombers. The second strike wave was commanded by Lieutenant Commander Mamoru Seki (Shōkaku Hikōtaichō), where Shōkaku contributed Aichi D3A dive bombers and Zuikaku contributed Nakajima B5N torpedo bombers.

In some instances, the Hikōtaichō from both carriers joined in the same strike wave and the senior of the two was in the overall command. An example of this was during the Battle of the Coral Sea, where Lieutenant Commander Kakuichi Takahashi (Shōkaku Hikōtaichō) and Lieutenant Commander Shigekazu Shimazaki (Zuikaku Hikōtaichō) both participated in all strike waves during the battle. In this case, Takahashi flew a dive bomber and was in overall command, while Shimazaki flew a torpedo bomber and led all other torpedo bombers.

A Hikōtaichō was not necessary a pilot. For example, during the Attack on Pearl Harbor, Commander Mitsuo Fuchida (Akagi Hikōtaichō) was in the observer/bombardier seat, while his Nakajima B5N torpedo bomber was piloted by Lieutenant Mitsuo Matsuzaki. In another example, during the Attack on Pearl Harbor and the Battle of Midway, Lieutenant Takehiko Chihaya (Akagi Hikōtaichō) was an observer; his Aichi D3A dive bomber was piloted by Petty Officer First Class Kiyoto Furuta. In land-based bomber units, Hikōtaichō was often in the observer seat.

== Aircraft marking ==
In carrier-based units, the position of Hikōtaichō was marked by three horizontal stripes on the tail of an aircraft. However, this marking should not be confused with the vertical stripes around the rear of the fuselage, which indicated to which carrier the aircraft belonged.

== See also ==
- Buntaichō
