= Kiyoto Furuta =

Japanese WWII dive bomber pilot

- 古田 清人
- Born: 1914; Yamaguchi Prefecture, Empire of Japan
- Military career
- Allegiance: Empire of Japan
- Branch: Imperial Japanese Navy Air Service (IJN)
- Rank: Lieutenant (jg)
- Units: 12th Air Group; Sōryū; Akagi; Shōkaku
- Conflicts: Second Sino-Japanese War; World War II; Attack on Pearl Harbor; Bombing of Darwin; Indian Ocean Raid; Battle of Midway; Battle of the Eastern Solomons; Battle of the Santa Cruz Islands; Solomon Islands Campaign

Kiyoto Furuta (古田 清人, Furuta Kiyoto; born 1914) was a dive bomber pilot in the Imperial Japanese Navy (IJN) during World War II. He flew Aichi D3A dive bomber from carrier Akagi during the Attack on Pearl Harbor and the Indian Ocean Raid, and later from carrier Shōkaku in both carrier battles during Solomon Islands Campaign, where he scored bomb hits on United States Navy (USN) carrier Enterprise on two separate occasions.

== Early career ==
Kiyoto Furuta was born in 1914 in Yamaguchi Prefecture to a poor farmer family with five children. In his youth, he often worked hard in the field to help his father. In order to escape the hard farming life, he volunteered for the Imperial Japanese Navy in 1931. He went through the training at Kure naval base and eventually became a mechanic. He aspired to become a pilot and passed a pre-test for naval pilot training. However, he was initially rejected during the physical exam due to a problem with his eardrum. The problem was eventually resolved after six months and he was then accepted for the naval pilot training program at Kasumigaura Air Group near Tokyo. He graduated from the 32nd class in 1936 and specialized in dive bombing.

In 1937, Furuta was first assigned to the 12th Air Group to fight in Central China before he was transferred to the newest carrier Sōryū. He was eventually promoted to Petty Officer. He wanted to leave the navy in order to pursue civil aviation career, however, Japan was about to enter the war with the United States and needed all available pilots. In October 1941, he was transferred to Akagi in preparation for the Attack on Pearl Harbor.

== Pacific War ==
During the Attack on Pearl Harbor, Petty Officer Furuta flew as pilot Akagi's dive bomber squadron leader (Hikōtaichō), Lieutenant Takehiko Chihaya. Since the US carriers, which were their intended targets, were not present at the time of the attack, they hit the battleships instead. The element of surprise was long gone by the time the second wave arrived, leading them to face an intense anti-aircraft fire. After releasing the bomb, Furuta's aircraft was hit in the left fuel tank and started leaking. He barely managed to return to Akagi before his fuel ran out.

In February 1942, Furuta took part in the Bombing of Darwin. In April, he participated in the Indian Ocean Raid, where he was part of the strike against the British carrier Hermes. By the time the Akagi pilots' turn arrived, the leading strike formation, under Lieutenant Commander Kakuichi Takahashi, had already effectively sunk Hermes with numerous bomb hits. Therefore, they attacked the Australian destroyer Vampire instead, sinking her within ten minutes.

During the Battle of Midway on 4 June 1942, Furuta was part of the strike force against the USN airfield and installations on Midway Atoll. On the way to the atoll, they were intercepted by a large group of Midway-based Marine fighters (six Grumman F4F Wildcats and 20 Brewster F2A Buffalos) led by Major Floyd B. Parks. In the ensuing air battle, four Nakajima B5N bombers and one Mitsubishi A6M Zero fighter were shot down by the Americans. In return, two F4Fs and 13 F2As were shot down, while most of the remaining were damaged beyond airworthiness. Furuta and his group of dive bombers hit the Midway airfield and headed back to the IJN fleet. Upon returning, he witnessed the unsuccessful attack on IJN carriers by the Midway-based Marine Douglas SBD Dauntless dive bombers. After the attack was over, he landed on Akagi, which was preparing to launch a strike against the USN carrier detected in the North-East. However, before the preparation could be finished, Akagi was hit and set ablaze by a bomb dropped by Lieutenant Dick Best during the USN dive bomber attack. Furuta and the rest of the crew were given an order to abandon the ship and were evacuated.

In July 1942, Petty Officer Furuta was transferred to Shōkaku. He served as a pilot of dive bomber division leader (Buntaichō) Lieutenant Keiichi Arima. In late August 1942, Shōkaku participated in the Battle of the Eastern Solomons. During the attack on USN carriers, Furuta was part of the first strike wave that consisted of 27 D3A dive bombers and 10 A6M Zero fighters, under the command of Lieutenant Commander Mamoru Seki (Hikōtaichō). Arima led one of the three divisions (chūtai), with nine dive bombers under his command. A USN Combat Air Patrol (CAP) of Grumman F4F Wildcat fighters intercepted the formation of dive bombers, but Furuta and Arima's division managed to escape into cumulonimbus clouds and approached the US carrier Enterprise unharmed. Furuta made a dive-bombing attack on Enterprise and released his 250-kilogram semi-AP bomb around an altitude of 500 meters. The bomb, the first ever to hit Enterprise, penetrated the starboard forward corner of her number 3 elevator aft and sliced through to the third deck before detonating inside the ship. After the attack, Lieutenant Arima instructed Furuta to remain north-west of the burning Enterprise to wait for the friendly Zero fighters in order to lead them back to the Japanese carriers. However, several USN fighters spotted their aircraft and started to pursue them. Furuta evaded the attackers by flying very close to the sea surface and eventually made it back to the IJN fleet after sunset. In the dark, he barely found Shōkaku before his fuel ran out.

In late October 1942, Shōkaku was again dispatched to the Solomon Islands to support the Imperial Japanese Army ground assault on Henderson Field on Guadalcanal. During the Battle of the Santa Cruz Islands, Furuta was again the pilot of Lieutenant Arima, whose division was part of Lieutenant Commander Seki's second strike wave that consisted of 27 D3A dive bombers and 5 A6M Zero fighters. Arima's division again attacked Enterprise. Furuta approached the carrier from astern and released the bomb at an altitude of between 450 and 500 meters and scored a hit. The 250-kilogram semi-AP bomb penetrated the center of the flight deck, around six meters from the forward edge, and detonated inside the carrier causing fires. They did not encounter any CAP on the way out and Arima instructed Furuta to climb to 6000 meters, where he could estimate the damage they had caused on Enterprise. Since a simultaneous USN strike damaged the flight deck of Shōkaku, Furuta was forced to land on Zuikaku upon return to the IJN fleet.

== Later career ==
After the Battle of the Santa Cruz Islands, Petty Officer Furuta was transferred to Usa Air Group in Ōita Prefecture on Kyushu and served as an instructor (together with his observer Lieutenant Arima). He was eventually promoted to Lieutenant (jg) and was considered for promotion to full Lieutenant. However, he refused the promotion as he wanted to retire from the navy to pursue his initial goal to become a civil aviation pilot. He survived the war but like many other former officers had trouble finding a job, since former officers were not allowed to hold public jobs in the post-war period according to the policy dictated by the Allies. He eventually settled on farming.
