= Hideki Shingō =

Imperial Japanese Navy fighter pilot

- 新郷 英城
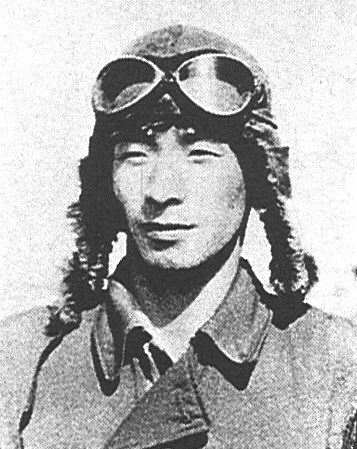
- Born: 10 October 1911; Saga Prefecture, Japan
- Died: 27 November 1982 (aged 71); Tokyo, Japan
- Military career
- Allegiance: Empire of Japan
- Branch: Imperial Japanese Navy Air Service (IJN); Japan Air Self-Defense Force (JASDF)
- Service years: 1933–1945 (IJN); 1954–1962 (JASDF)
- Rank: Commander (IJN); Lieutenant General (JASDF)
- Units: Kaga; Tainan Air Group; 6th Air Group; Shōkaku; 331st Air Group
- Conflicts: Second Sino-Japanese War; World War II; Invasion of Philippines; Invasion of Dutch East Indies; Solomon Islands Campaign; Battle of the Eastern Solomons; Battle of the Santa Cruz Islands; Burma campaign

Hideki Shingō (新郷 英城, Shingō Hideki; 10 October 1911 – 27 November 1982) was a fighter pilot officer in the Imperial Japanese Navy (IJN) during World War II. He participated in various battles and campaigns throughout the Pacific War and survived the war.

== Early career ==
Hideki Shingō was born in Saga Prefecture. He enrolled in the Imperial Japanese Naval Academy in November 1933 and graduated from the 59th class in July 1933. He was eventually assigned to carrier Kaga's fighter squadron. He flew Mitsubishi A5M from Kaga during the early stages of Second Sino-Japanese War. In March 1938 he was transferred to Japan, where he served as an instructor at various naval air bases until he was transferred to Formosa (then part of the Empire of Japan).

== Pacific War ==
Lieutenant Shingō became the leader (Hikōtaichō) of Tainan Air Group when it was formed in Tainan on 1 October 1941. On 8 December 1941, he led 44 Mitsubishi A6M Zero fighters that escorted Mitsubishi G3M and Mitsubishi G4M bombers in the Attack on Clark Field at the beginning of the Invasion of Philippines. In January 1942, his unit covered landings at Balikpapan on Borneo during the Invasion of Dutch East Indies, and then moved its base of operations there after the airfield was captured by ground forces. While a part of the Tainan Air Group was engaged in the air battle over Surabaya on 3 February, he led 14 A6M Zeros for a sweep over Malang. In April he was reassigned to 6th Air Group, where he stayed until May.

On 1 July 1942, Lieutenant Shingō was transferred to carrier Shōkaku and became its fighter squadron leader. In late August 1942, he led Combat Air Patrol (CAP) over the IJN carrier force during the Battle of the Eastern Solomons. Following the battle, his squadron was temporarily sent to a newly built airfield on Buka in the Solomon Islands, where he led several missions to Guadalcanal, before they rejoined the carrier. During one of these missions, his aircraft was damaged and he was forced to crash-land near Guadalcanal. However, he was rescued and safely returned to his unit.

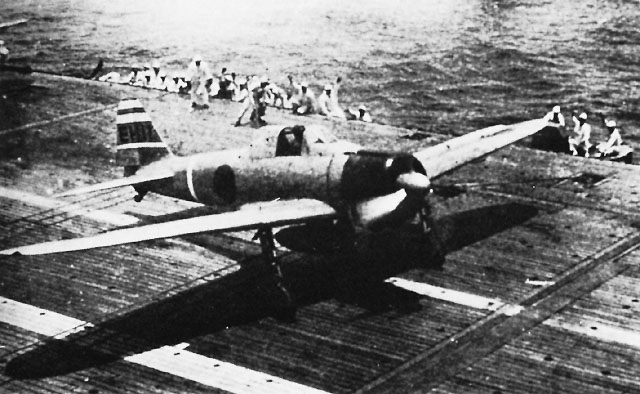
Lieutenant Hideki Shingō taking off from Shōkaku during the Battle of the Santa Cruz Islands.

In late October 1942, Lieutenant Shingō participated in the Battle of the Santa Cruz Islands. He led a group of five A6M Zero fighters to escort the second strike wave on United States Navy (USN) carriers that consisted of 19 Aichi D3A dive bombers and 16 Nakajima B5N torpedo bombers, and which was under the command of Lieutenant Commander Mamoru Seki. During the attack on USN carriers, he and his Zero fighters descended to a lower altitude and closer to the enemy ships in order to draw the anti-aircraft fire away from the friendly dive bombers. His group then sought to escort the dive bombers on their way out after they dropped their bombs, however, they were not able to locate them. Neither they were able to encounter any USN Grumman F4F Wildcat fighters, however, they later found a PBY Catalina flying boat and badly damaged it.

On 1 July 1943, 331st Air Group was formed at Saeki on Kyushu and Lieutenant Commander Shingō became its commander (Hikōtaichō). In August they were transported to Indian Ocean area by carrier Jun'yō, where they operated from land bases in Dutch East Indies and on Andaman and Nicobar Islands. On 5 December 1943, his group participated in a large joint Army and Navy strike on Kolkata. His 27 A6M Zero fighters escorted nine G4M bombers and engaged with the defending Hawker Hurricane and Supermarine Spitfire fighters of Royal Air Force. In March 1944 he was reassigned.

After that, Lieutenant Commander Shingō served as a commander of various units, including 341st Air Group, which operated the new Kawanishi N1K fighters. He survived the war and later served in Japan Self-Defense Forces from 1954 to 1962.
