= Battle of the Eastern Solomons =

World War II carrier battle in the Pacific Theater

- Part of the Guadalcanal campaign of World War II
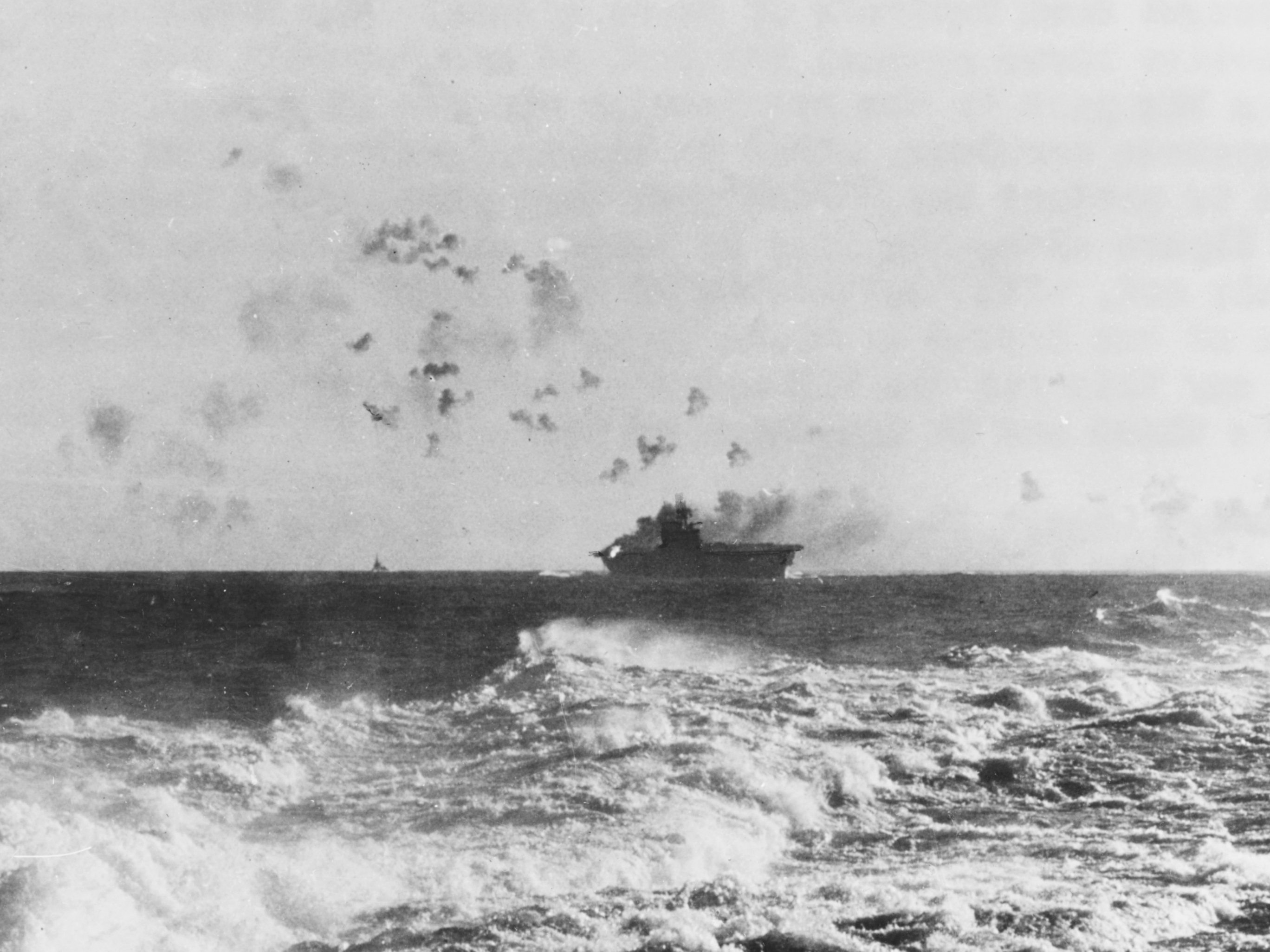
- USS Enterprise maneuvering radically under aerial attack and afire on 24 August 1942. Anti-aircraft shell bursts are visible above the carrier.
Date	24–25 August 1942
Location	North of Santa Isabel, Solomon Islands
Result	American victory

Belligerents
United States	Japan

Commanders and leaders
Frank Jack Fletcher; Thomas C. Kinkaid	Nobutake Kondō; Chūichi Nagumo; Hiroaki Abe; Chūichi Hara; Gunichi Mikawa

Strength
2 fleet carriers; 1 battleship; 4 heavy cruisers; 2 light cruisers; 13 destroyers; 176 aircraft	2 fleet carriers; 1 light carrier; 3 battleships; 13 heavy cruisers; 3 light cruisers; 30 destroyers; 1 seaplane tender; 4 patrol boats; 3 transports; 171–177 aircraft

Casualties and losses
1 fleet carrier heavily damaged; 20 aircraft destroyed; 90 killed	1 light carrier sunk; 1 destroyer sunk; 1 transport sunk; 1 seaplane tender heavily damaged; 1 light cruiser damaged; 75 aircraft destroyed; 290+ killed

The naval Battle of the Eastern Solomons (also known as the Battle of the Stewart Islands and in Japanese sources as the Second Battle of the Solomon Sea) took place on 24–25 August 1942 and was the third carrier battle of the Pacific campaign of World War II and the second major engagement fought between the United States Navy and the Imperial Japanese Navy (IJN) during the Guadalcanal campaign. As at the Battle of the Coral Sea and the Battle of Midway, the ships of the two adversaries were never within sight of each other. Instead, all attacks were carried out by carrier-based or land-based aircraft.

After several damaging air attacks, the naval surface combatants from both America and Japan withdrew from the battle area. Although neither side secured a clear victory, the U.S. and its allies gained a tactical and strategic advantage. Japan's losses were greater and included dozens of aircraft and their experienced aircrews. Also, Japanese reinforcements intended for Guadalcanal were delayed and eventually delivered by warships rather than transport ships, giving the Allies more time to prepare for the Japanese counteroffensive and preventing the Japanese from landing heavy artillery, ammunition, and other supplies.

== Background ==
On 7 August, Allied forces, consisting mainly of U.S. Marine Corps units, landed on Guadalcanal, Tulagi, and the Florida Islands in the Solomon Islands. The landings on the islands were meant to deny their use by the Japanese as bases to threaten supply routes between the U.S. and Australia, and secure the islands as launching points for a campaign with an eventual goal of isolating the major Japanese base at Rabaul while also supporting the Allied New Guinea campaign. The landings initiated the six-month-long Guadalcanal campaign.

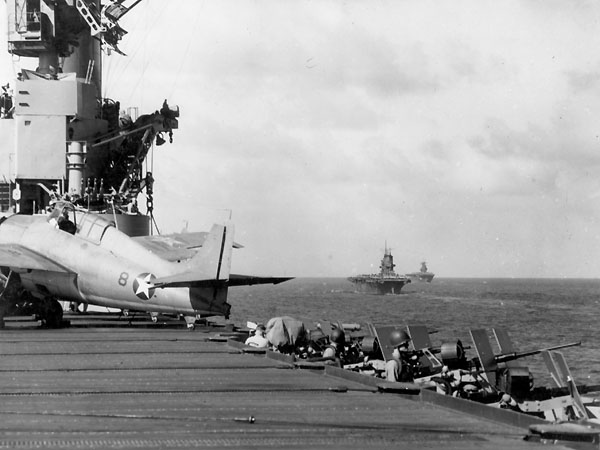
U.S. carriers Wasp (foreground), Saratoga, and Enterprise (background) operating in the Pacific south of Guadalcanal on 12 August 1942

The Allied landings were directly supported by three U.S. aircraft carrier task forces (TFs): TF 11 centered around USS Saratoga; TF 16 based on USS Enterprise; and TF 18 formed around USS Wasp; their respective air groups; and supporting surface warships, including the battleship USS North Carolina (BB-55), four cruisers, and 11 destroyers. Not all of the ships were U.S. warships; attached to TF 11 was TF 44, commanded by Victor Alexander Charles Crutchley, which included the Royal Australian Navy cruisers HMAS Australia and Hobart. The overall commander of the three carrier task forces was Vice Admiral Frank Jack Fletcher, who flew his flag on Saratoga. The aircraft from the three carriers provided close air support for the invasion forces and defended against Japanese air attacks from Rabaul. After a successful landing, they remained in the South Pacific Area charged with four main objectives: guarding the line of communication between the major Allied bases at New Caledonia and Espiritu Santo; giving support to Allied ground forces at Guadalcanal and Tulagi against possible Japanese counteroffensives; covering the movement of supply ships aiding Guadalcanal; and engaging and destroying any Japanese warships that came within range.

Between 15 and 20 August, the U.S. carriers covered the delivery of fighter and bomber aircraft to the newly opened Henderson Field on Guadalcanal. This small, hard-won airfield was a critical point in the entire island chain, and both sides considered that control of the airbase offered potential control of the local airspace. In fact, Henderson Field and the aircraft based there were able to limit the movement of Japanese forces in the Solomon Islands and assist in the attrition of Japanese air forces in the South Pacific Area. Allied control of Henderson Field became the key factor in the entire battle for Guadalcanal.

Surprised by the Allied offensive in the Solomons, Japanese naval forces, commanded by Admiral Isoroku Yamamoto, and army forces prepared a counteroffensive, with the goal of driving the Allies from Guadalcanal and Tulagi. The counteroffensive was called "Operation Ka", from the first syllable in the Japanese name for Guadalcanal. The naval forces had the additional objective of destroying Allied warship forces in the South Pacific Area, specifically the U.S. carriers.

== Battle ==
=== Prelude ===
On 16 August, a Japanese convoy of three slow transport ships loaded with 1,411 soldiers from the 28th "Ichiki" Infantry Regiment, as well as several hundred naval troops from the 5th Yokosuka Special Naval Landing Force, departed the major Japanese base at Truk Lagoon (Chuuk) and headed towards Guadalcanal. The transports were guarded by the light cruiser Jintsū, eight destroyers, and four patrol boats, with the escort force commanded by Rear Admiral Raizō Tanaka, who flew his flag in Jintsū. Also departing from Rabaul to help protect the convoy was a "close cover force" of four heavy cruisers from the 8th Fleet, commanded by Vice Admiral Gunichi Mikawa. These were the same, relatively old, heavy cruisers that had defeated an Allied naval surface force in the earlier Battle of Savo Island, less Kako, which had been sunk by an American submarine on her journey from that battle to her base. The four heavy cruisers of Mikawa's group left the Shortlands on 23 August and became tangentially involved, dropping bombs on Henderson Field during the following nights with their float planes. Tanaka planned to land the troops from his convoy on Guadalcanal on 24 August.

On 21 August, the rest of the Japanese Ka naval force departed Truk, heading for the southern Solomons. These ships were divided into three groups. The "main body" contained the Japanese carriers Shōkaku and Zuikaku, the light carrier Ryūjō, and a screening force of one heavy cruiser and eight destroyers, commanded by Vice Admiral Chūichi Nagumo in Shōkaku. The "vanguard force" consisted of two battleships, three heavy cruisers, one light cruiser, and six destroyers, commanded by Rear Admiral Hiroaki Abe. The "advanced force" contained five heavy cruisers, one light cruiser, five destroyers, the seaplane carrier Chitose, and a "covering group" consisting of the battleship Mutsu and three destroyers, commanded by Vice Admiral Nobutake Kondō. Finally, a force of about 100 IJN land-based bombers, fighters, and reconnaissance aircraft at Rabaul and nearby islands were positioned for operational support. Nagumo's main body positioned itself behind the "vanguard" and "advanced" forces in an attempt to more easily remain hidden from U.S. reconnaissance aircraft.

The Ka plan dictated that once U.S. carriers were located, either by Japanese scout aircraft or an attack on one of the Japanese surface forces, Nagumo's carriers would immediately launch a strike force to destroy them. With the U.S. carriers destroyed or disabled, Abe's "vanguard" and Kondo's "advanced" forces would close with and destroy the remaining Allied naval forces in a warship surface action. This would then allow Japanese naval forces the freedom to neutralize Henderson Field through bombardment while covering the landing of the Japanese army troops to retake Guadalcanal and Tulagi.

In response to an unanticipated land battle fought between U.S. Marines and Japanese forces on Guadalcanal on 19–20 August, the U.S. carrier task forces under Fletcher reversed towards Guadalcanal from their positions 400 nautical miles (460 mi; 740 km) to the south on 21 August. The U.S. carriers were to support the Marines, protect Henderson Field, engage the enemy and destroy any Japanese naval forces that arrived to support Japanese troops in the land battle on Guadalcanal.

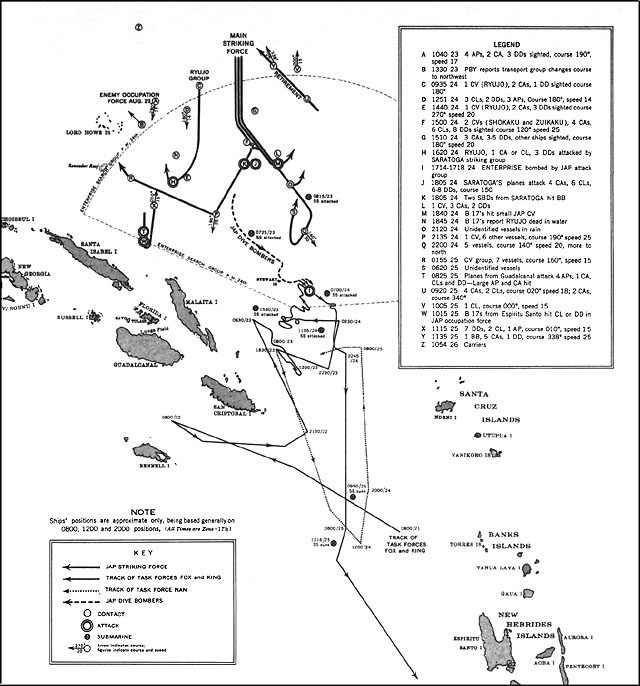
U.S. Navy map from 1943 showing approximate paths and actions of Japanese (top) and Allied (bottom) naval forces in the battle from 23–26 August 1942. Guadalcanal is the large, roughly oval-shaped island in the center-left of the map.

Both Allied and Japanese naval forces continued to converge on 22 August, and both sides conducted intense aircraft scouting efforts, but neither side spotted its adversary. At least one Japanese scouting aircraft was shot down by aircraft from Enterprise before it could send a radio report, and this caused the Japanese to strongly suspect that U.S. carriers were in the immediate area. The U.S. forces were unaware of the disposition and strength of the approaching Japanese surface warship forces.

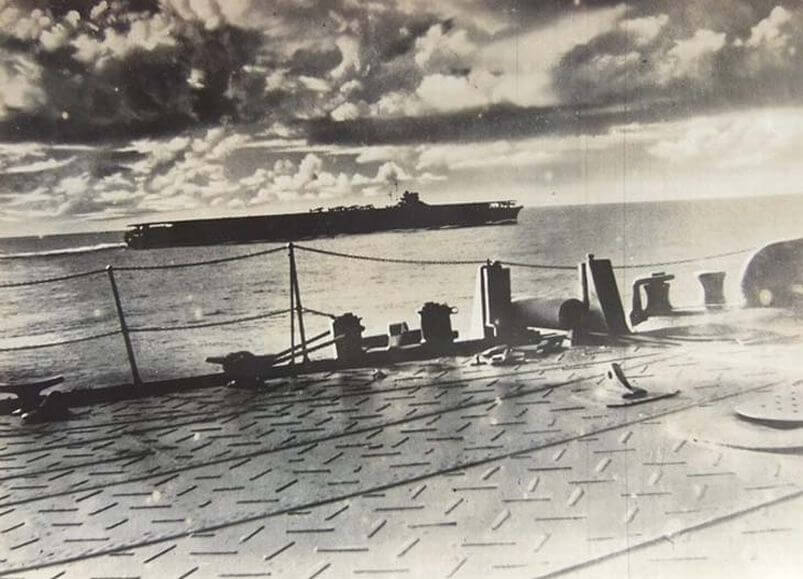
Shōkaku, photographed from Zuikaku, underway during the battle, 24 August 1942

At 09:50 on 23 August, a U.S. PBY Catalina flying boat operating out of Ndeni in the Santa Cruz Islands initially sighted Tanaka's convoy. By late afternoon, with no further sightings of Japanese ships, two aircraft strike forces from Saratoga and Henderson Field took off to attack the convoy. Tanaka, knowing that an attack would be forthcoming following the PBY sighting, reversed course once it had departed the area and eluded the strike aircraft. After Tanaka reported to his superiors his loss of time by turning north to avoid the expected Allied airstrike, the landings of his troops on Guadalcanal was pushed back to 25 August. By 18:23 on 23 August, with no Japanese carriers sighted and no new intelligence reporting of their presence in the area, Fletcher detached Wasp, which was getting low on fuel, and the rest of TF 18 for the two-day trip south toward Efate Island to refuel. Thus, Wasp and her escorting warships missed the upcoming battle.

=== Carrier action on 24 August ===
At 01:45 on 24 August, Nagumo ordered Rear Admiral Chūichi Hara, commanding the light carrier Ryūjō, the heavy cruiser Tone and the destroyers Amatsukaze and Tokitsukaze, to proceed ahead of the main Japanese force and send an aircraft attack force against Henderson Field at daybreak. The Ryūjō mission was most possibly in response to a request from the naval commander at Rabaul, Nishizō Tsukahara, for help from the combined fleet in neutralizing Henderson Field. According to Tameichi Hara, who was present and commanding Amatsukaze at the battle, the role of the Ryūjō force was to act as a decoy to divert U.S. attention, allowing the rest of the Japanese force to approach the U.S. naval forces undetected, as well as to help provide protection and cover for Tanaka's convoy. Most of the aircraft on Shōkaku and Zuikaku were readied to launch on short notice if the U.S. carriers were located. Between 05:55 and 06:30, the U.S. carriers, mainly Enterprise, augmented by PBY Catalinas from Ndeni, launched their own scout aircraft to search for the Japanese naval forces.

At 09:35, a Catalina made the first sighting of the Ryūjō force. Later that morning, several more sightings by carrier and other U.S. reconnaissance aircraft followed, including Ryūjō and ships of Kondo's and Mikawa's forces. Throughout the morning and early afternoon, U.S. aircraft also sighted several Japanese scout aircraft and submarines, leading Fletcher to believe that the Japanese knew where his carriers were, which actually was not yet the case. Still, Fletcher hesitated to order a strike against the Ryūjō group until he was sure there were no other Japanese carriers in the area. Finally, with no firm word on the presence or location of other Japanese carriers, at 13:40 Fletcher launched a strike of 38 aircraft from Saratoga to attack Ryūjō. He kept aircraft in reserve on both U.S. carriers in case any Japanese fleet carriers were sighted.

Meanwhile, at 12:20, Ryūjō launched six Nakajima B5N2 bombers and 15 A6M3 Zero fighters to attack Henderson Field in conjunction with an attack by 24 Mitsubishi G4M2 bombers and 14 Zero fighters from Rabaul. Unknown to the Ryūjō aircraft, the Rabaul aircraft had encountered severe weather and returned to their base at 11:30. The Ryūjō aircraft were detected on radar by Saratoga as they flew toward Guadalcanal, further fixing the location of their ship for the impending U.S. attack. The Ryūjō aircraft arrived over Henderson Field at 14:23 and tangled with the Cactus Air Force based at Henderson while they bombed the airfield. In the resulting engagement, three B5N level bombers, three Zeros, and three U.S. fighters were shot down, and no significant damage was done to Henderson Field.

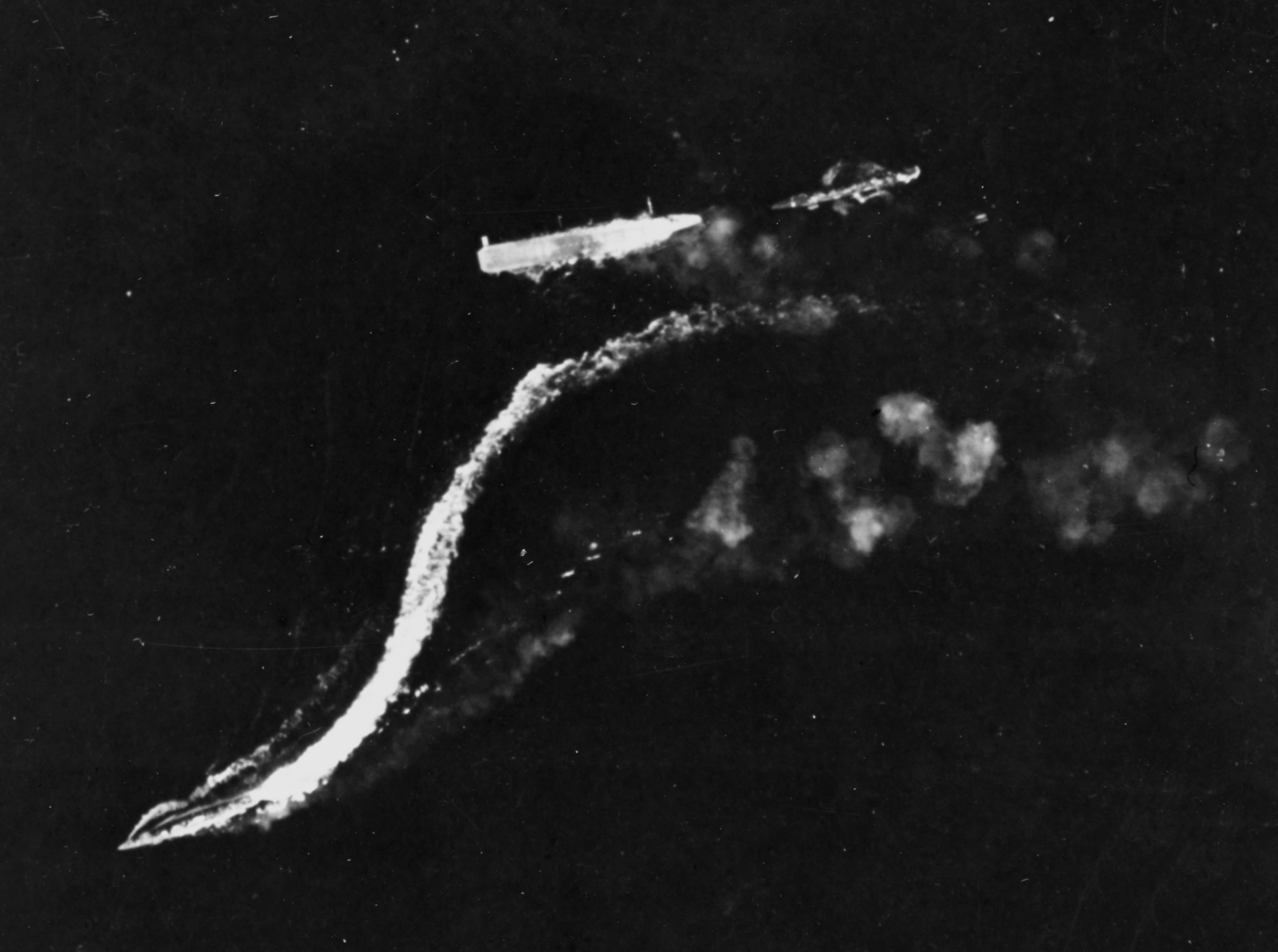
The disabled Ryūjō (just right of center) under high-level attack by B-17 bombers. The destroyer Amatsukaze (bottom left) is moving away from Ryujo at full speed and the Tokitsukaze is backing away from the bow of Ryūjō to evade the falling bombs.

Almost simultaneously, at 14:25 a Japanese scout aircraft from the cruiser Chikuma sighted the U.S. carriers. Although the aircraft was shot down, its report was transmitted in time, and Nagumo immediately ordered his strike force launched from Shōkaku and Zuikaku. The first wave of aircraft, consisting of 27 Aichi D3A2 dive bombers and 15 Zeros under the command of Lieutenant Commander Mamoru Seki, was in the air by 14:50 and on its way toward Enterprise and Saratoga. About this same time, two U.S. scout aircraft finally sighted the main Japanese force, but because of communication problems these sighting reports never reached Fletcher. Before leaving the area, the two U.S. scout aircraft attacked Shōkaku, causing negligible damage but forcing five of the first-wave Zeros to give chase, thus aborting their mission. At 16:00 a second wave of 9 Zeros and 27 D3A dive bombers, under the command of Lieutenant Sadamu Takahashi, was launched by the Japanese carriers and headed south toward the U.S. carriers. Abe's "Vanguard" force also surged ahead in anticipation of meeting the U.S. ships in a surface action after nightfall.

Also at this time, the Saratoga strike force arrived and attacked Ryūjō, hitting and heavily damaging her with three to five bombs and perhaps one torpedo, and killing 120 of her crew. Also during this time, several U.S. B-17 heavy bombers attacked the crippled Ryūjō but caused no additional damage. The crew abandoned the heavily damaged Japanese carrier at nightfall, and she sank soon after. Amatsukaze and Tokitsukaze rescued Ryūjō's survivors and the aircrews from her returning strike force, who ditched their aircraft in the ocean nearby. After the rescue operations were complete, both Japanese destroyers and Tone rejoined Nagumo's main force.

At 16:02, still waiting for a definitive report on the location of the Japanese fleet carriers, the U.S. carriers' radar detected the first incoming wave of Japanese strike aircraft. Fifty-three F4F-4 Wildcat fighters from the two U.S. carriers were directed by radar control towards the attackers. Communication problems, limitations of the aircraft identification capabilities of the radar, primitive control procedures, and effective screening of the Japanese dive bombers by their escorting Zeros, prevented all but a few of the U.S. fighters from engaging the D3A dive bombers before they began their attacks on the U.S. carriers. Just before the Japanese dive bombers began their attacks, Enterprise and Saratoga cleared their decks for the impending action by launching the aircraft that they had been holding ready in case the Japanese fleet carriers were sighted. These aircraft were told to fly north and attack anything they could find, or else to circle outside the battle zone, until it was safe to return.

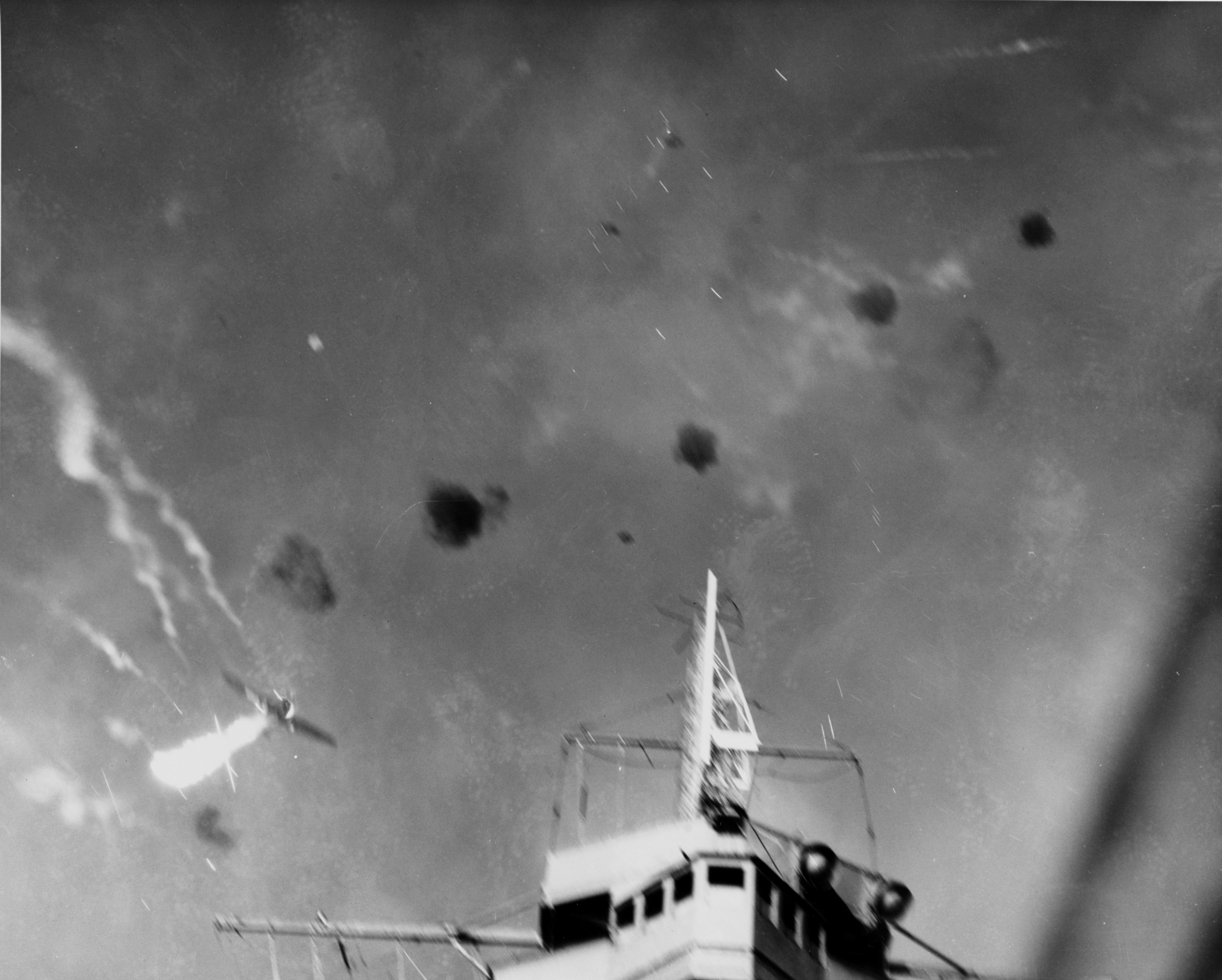
A Japanese D3A dive bomber, believed to be piloted by Yoshihiro Iida, is shot down by anti-aircraft fire directly over Enterprise.

At 16:29, the Japanese dive bombers began their attacks. Although several attempted to set up to attack Saratoga, they quickly shifted back to the nearer carrier, Enterprise. Thus, Enterprise was the target of almost the entire Japanese air attack. In a desperate attempt to disrupt their attacks, several Wildcats followed the D3A dive bombers into their attack dives, despite the intense anti-aircraft artillery fire from Enterprise and her screening warships. As many as four Wildcats were shot down by U.S. anti-aircraft fire, as well as several D3A dive bombers.

Because of the effective anti-aircraft fire from the U.S. ships, plus evasive maneuvers, the bombs from the first nine D3A dive bombers missed Enterprise. The second division, which was led by Lieutenant Keiichi Arima, managed to score three hits. Initially, the lead D3A dive bomber, piloted by Petty Officer Kiyoto Furuta, scored a hit with a 250-kilogram (551 lb) semi-armor-piercing, delayed-action "ordinary" bomb that penetrated the flight deck near the aft elevator and passed through three decks before detonating below the waterline, killing 35 men and wounding 70 more. Incoming seawater caused Enterprise to develop a slight list, but it was not a major breach of hull integrity.

Just 30 seconds later, the next D3A dive bomber, piloted by Petty Officer Tamotsu Akimoto, planted its 241-kilogram (531 lb) high-explosive "land" bomb only 15 feet (4.6 m) away from where the first bomb hit. The resulting detonation ignited a large secondary explosion from one of the nearby 5-inch (127 mm) guns' ready powder casings, killing 35 members of the nearby gun crews and starting a large fire.

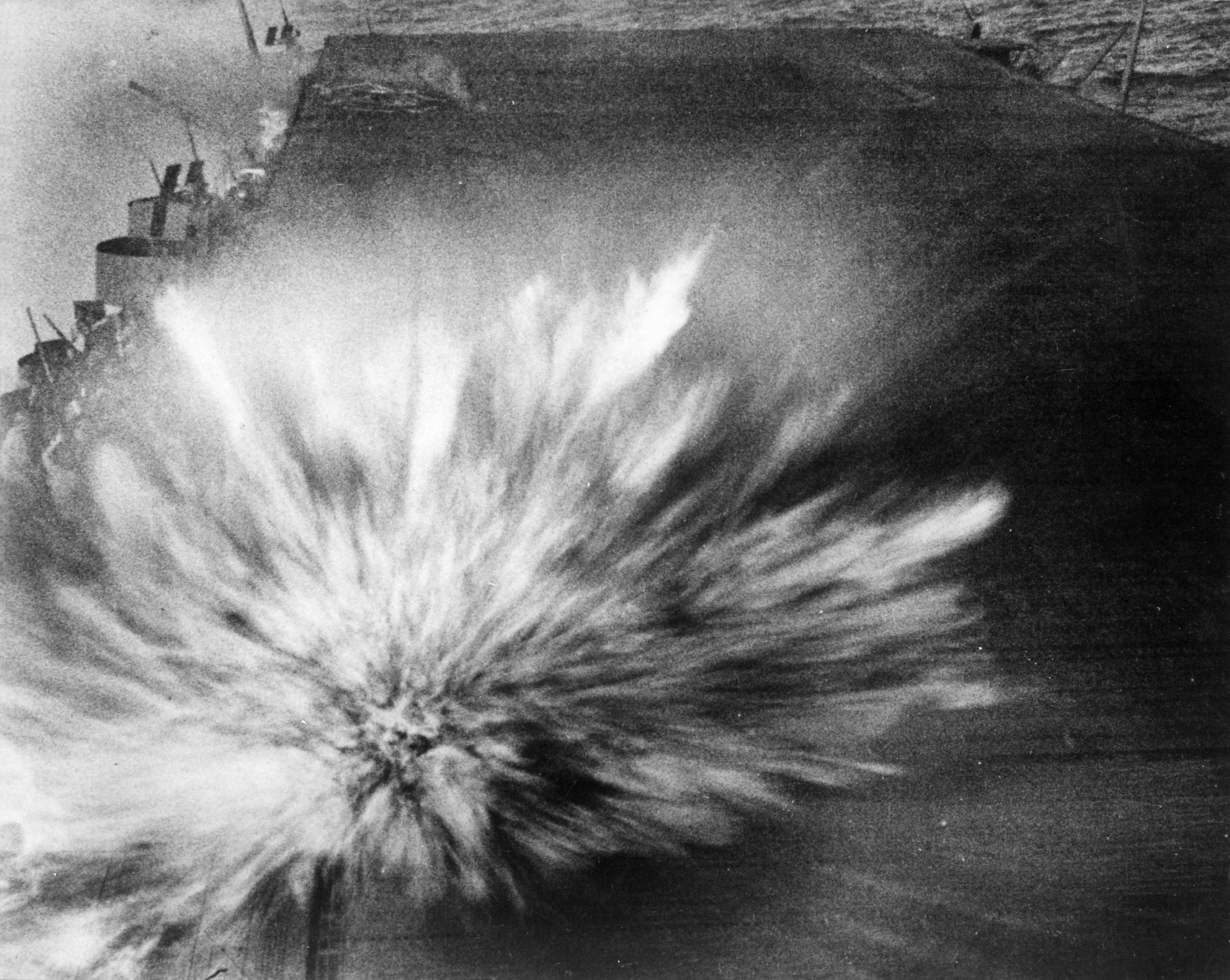
The third and last bomb, dropped by an aircraft piloted by Kazumi Horie, who died in the attack, hits Enterprise, causing minor damage. Smoke from the first two bomb hits can be seen in the upper left of the picture.

About a minute later, at 16:46, a third and last bomb (also a 241-kilogram (531 lb) "land" bomb), dropped by Petty Officer Kazumi Horie, hit Enterprise on the flight deck forward of where the first two bombs hit. This bomb exploded on contact, creating a 10-foot (3 m) hole in the deck but causing no further damage. Seven D3A dive bombers—three from Shokaku and four from Zuikaku—then broke off from the attack on Enterprise to attack the battleship USS North Carolina, but all were shot down by anti-aircraft fire or U.S. fighters. The attack was over at 16:48, and the surviving Japanese aircraft reassembled in small groups and returned to their ships.

Both sides thought that they had inflicted more damage than was the case. The U.S. claimed to have shot down 70 Japanese aircraft, even though there were only 37 aircraft in all. Actual Japanese losses—from all causes—in the engagement were 25 aircraft, with most of the crews of the lost aircraft not being recovered or rescued. The Japanese, for their part, mistakenly believed that they had heavily damaged two U.S. carriers, instead of just one. The U.S. lost six aircraft in the engagement, along with five pilots.

Although Enterprise was heavily damaged and on fire, her damage-control teams were able to make sufficient repairs for the ship to resume flight operations at 17:46, only one hour after the engagement ended. At 18:05, the Saratoga strike force returned from sinking Ryūjō and landed without major incident. The second wave of Japanese aircraft approached the U.S. carriers at 18:15 but was unable to locate the U.S. formation because of communication problems and had to return to their carriers without attacking any U.S. ships. It lost five aircraft from operational mishaps. Most of the U.S. carrier aircraft launched just before the first wave of Japanese aircraft attacked failed to find any targets, but two SBD Dauntlesses from Saratoga sighted Kondo's advanced force and attacked the seaplane tender Chitose, scoring two near-misses which heavily damaged the unarmored ship. The U.S. carrier aircraft either landed at Henderson Field or were able to return to their carriers after dusk. The U.S. ships retired to the south to get out of range of any approaching Japanese warships. In fact, Abe's "vanguard force" and Kondō's "advanced force" were steaming south to try to catch the U.S. carrier task forces in a surface battle, but they turned around at midnight without having made contact with the U.S. warships. Nagumo's main body, having taken heavy aircraft losses in the engagement and being low on fuel, also retreated northward.

=== Actions on 25 August ===
Believing that two U.S. carriers had been taken out of action with heavy damage, Tanaka's reinforcement convoy again headed toward Guadalcanal, and by 08:00 on 25 August they were within 150 nmi (170 mi; 280 km) of their destination. At this time, Tanaka's convoy was joined by five destroyers (Mutsuki-class destroyers Mutsuki and Yayoi, Kagerou-class destroyers Kagerō and Isokaze, and Shiratsuyu-class destroyer Kawakaze) which had shelled Henderson Field the night before, causing slight damage. At 08:05, 18 U.S. aircraft from Henderson Field attacked Tanaka's convoy, causing heavy damage to Jintsu, killing 24 crewmen, and knocking Tanaka unconscious. The troop transport Kinryu Maru was also hit and eventually sank. Just as the destroyer Mutsuki pulled alongside Kinryu Maru to rescue her crew and embarked troops, she was attacked by four U.S. B-17s from Espiritu Santo, which landed five bombs on or around Mutsuki, sinking her immediately. An uninjured but shaken Tanaka transferred to the destroyer Kagerō, sent Jintsu back to Truk, and took the convoy to the Japanese base in the Shortland Islands.

Both the Japanese and the U.S. elected to completely withdraw their warships from the area, ending the battle. The Japanese naval forces lingered near the northern Solomons, out of range of the U.S. aircraft based at Henderson Field, before finally returning to Truk on 5 September.

== Aftermath ==
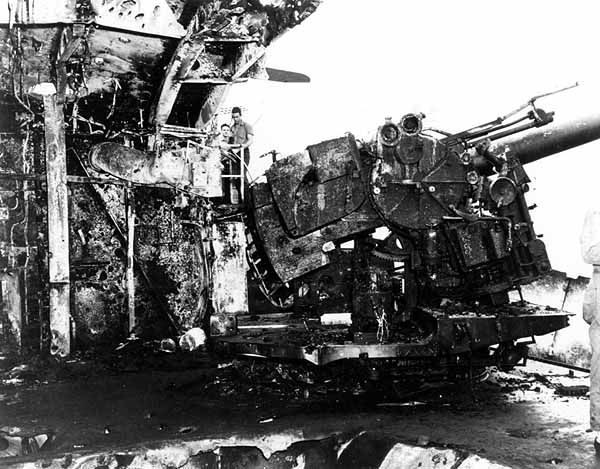
The burned-out 5 in (127 mm) gun gallery on Enterprise, photographed after the battle

The battle is generally considered to be a tactical and strategic victory for the U.S. because the Japanese lost more ships, aircraft, and aircrew, and Japanese troop reinforcements for Guadalcanal were delayed. Summing up the significance of the battle, historian Richard B. Frank states:

The Battle of the Eastern Solomons was unquestionably an American victory, but it had little long-term result, apart from a further reduction in the corps of trained Japanese carrier aviators. The [Japanese] reinforcements that could not come by slow transport would soon reach Guadalcanal by other means.

The U.S. lost only seven aircrew in the battle. The Japanese lost 61 veteran aircrew, who were difficult for the Japanese to replace because of an institutionalized limited capacity in their naval aircrew training programs and an absence of trained reserves. The troops in Tanaka's convoy were later loaded onto destroyers at the Shortland Islands and delivered piecemeal to Guadalcanal without most of their heavy equipment, beginning on 29 August. The Japanese claimed considerably more damage than they had inflicted, including that Hornet—not in the battle—had been sunk, thus avenging her part in the Doolittle Raid.

Emphasizing the strategic value of Henderson Field, in a separate reinforcement effort, the Japanese destroyer Asagiri was sunk and two other Japanese destroyers heavily damaged on 28 August, 70 nmi (81 mi; 130 km) north of Guadalcanal in New Georgia Sound by U.S. aircraft based at the airfield.

The damaged Enterprise traveled to Pearl Harbor for extensive repairs, which were completed on 15 October. She returned to the South Pacific on 24 October, just in time for the Battle of the Santa Cruz Islands and her rematch with Shōkaku and Zuikaku.

== See also ==
- United States Navy in World War II
- Imperial Japanese Navy of World War II
- Imperial Japanese Navy Air Service
- Pacific Theater aircraft carrier operations during World War II
- World War II carrier-versus-carrier engagements between Allied and Japanese naval forces:
  - Battle of the Coral Sea
  - Battle of Midway
  - Battle of the Santa Cruz Islands
  - Battle of the Philippine Sea
  - Battle of Leyte Gulf
