= Battle of the Santa Cruz Islands =

Fourth carrier battle of the Pacific campaign of World War II

- Part of the Guadalcanal campaign of World War II
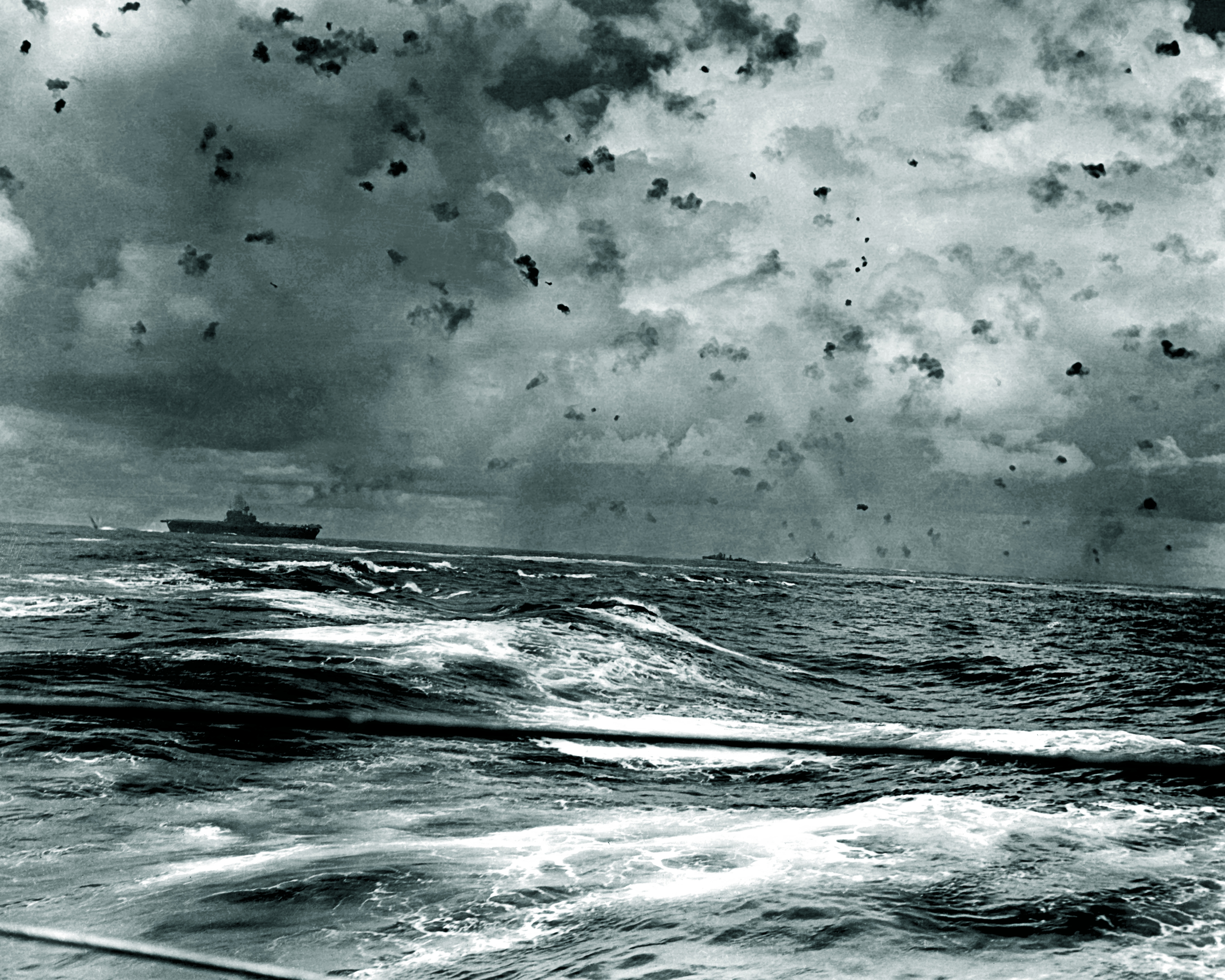
- USS Enterprise (center left) and her screening ships during the battle, 26 October 1942
Date	25–27 October 1942; 84 years ago
Location	Off the Santa Cruz Islands, Pacific Ocean 8°S 164°E
Result	Both sides claim victory; see Aftermath

Belligerents
United States	Japan

Commanders and leaders
(United States) William Halsey (United States) Thomas C. Kinkaid (United States) George Murray (United States) Charles P. Mason	(Empire of Japan) Nobutake Kondō (Empire of Japan) Chūichi Nagumo (Empire of Japan) Hiroaki Abe (Empire of Japan) Kakuji Kakuta

Strength
2 fleet carriers 1 battleship 3 heavy cruisers 3 light cruisers 14 destroyers 136 aircraft	3 fleet carriers 1 light carrier 4 battleships 8 heavy cruisers 2 light cruisers 24 destroyers 199 aircraft

Casualties and losses
266 killed 1 fleet carrier sunk 1 destroyer sunk 1 fleet carrier damaged 1 battleship damaged 1 light cruiser damaged 2 destroyers damaged 81 aircraft destroyed aircrew losses: 22 killed, 4 captured	400–500 killed 1 fleet carrier heavily damaged 1 light carrier heavily damaged 1 heavy cruiser damaged 1 destroyer damaged 99 aircraft destroyed aircrew losses: 148 killed
- Location within Pacific Ocean

The Battle of the Santa Cruz Islands, (Note: sometimes referred to as the Battle of Santa Cruz or Third Battle of Solomon Sea, in Japan as the Battle of the South Pacific (南太平洋海戦, Minamitaiheiyō kaisen)) fought during 25–27 October 1942, was the fourth aircraft carrier battle of the Pacific campaign of World War II. It was also the fourth major naval engagement fought between the United States Navy and the Imperial Japanese Navy during the lengthy and strategically important Guadalcanal campaign. As in the battles of the Coral Sea, Midway, and the Eastern Solomons, the ships of the two adversaries were rarely in sight or gun range of each other. Instead, almost all attacks by both sides were mounted by carrier- or land-based aircraft.

In an attempt to drive Allied forces from Guadalcanal and nearby islands and end the stalemate that had existed since September 1942, the Imperial Japanese Army planned a major ground offensive on Guadalcanal for 20–25 October 1942. In support of this offensive, and with the hope of engaging Allied naval forces, Japanese carriers and other large warships moved into a position near the southern Solomon Islands. From this location, the Japanese naval forces hoped to engage and decisively defeat any Allied (primarily US) naval forces, especially carrier forces, that responded to the ground offensive. Allied naval forces also hoped to meet the Japanese naval forces in battle, with the same objectives of breaking the stalemate and decisively defeating their adversary.

The Japanese ground offensive on Guadalcanal was underway with the Battle for Henderson Field while the naval warships and aircraft from the two adversaries confronted each other on the morning of 26 October 1942, just north of the Santa Cruz Islands. After an exchange of carrier air attacks, Allied surface ships retreated from the battle area with the fleet carrier Hornet sunk, and another fleet carrier, Enterprise, heavily damaged. The participating Japanese carrier forces also retired because of damage to two carriers, heavy aircraft losses, and the Japanese army's failure to capture Henderson Field.

Santa Cruz was a tactical victory for the Japanese in terms of both tonnage and control of the seas around Guadalcanal. However, Japan's loss of many irreplaceable veteran aircrews proved to be a long-term strategic advantage for the Allies, whose aircrew losses in the battle were relatively low and were quickly replaced. The Japanese had hoped for, and needed, a larger, decisive victory. The fact that the naval battle was won just after the land battle was lost meant that the opportunity to exploit their victory in the battle had already passed.

== Background ==
On 8 August 1942, Allied forces, predominantly from the United States, landed on Japanese-occupied Guadalcanal, Tulagi, and the Florida Islands in the Solomon Islands. The landings on the islands were meant to deny their use by the Japanese as bases for threatening the supply routes between the US and Australia, and to secure the islands as starting points for a campaign with the eventual goal of neutralizing the major Japanese base at Rabaul while also supporting the Allied New Guinea campaign. The landings initiated the six-month-long Guadalcanal campaign.

After the Battle of the Eastern Solomons on 24–25 August, in which the fleet carrier USS Enterprise was heavily damaged and forced to sail to Pearl Harbor, Hawaii, for a month of major repairs, three US carrier task forces remained in the South Pacific area. The task forces were based around the fleet carriers USS Wasp, Saratoga, and Hornet plus their respective air groups and supporting surface warships, including battleships, cruisers, and destroyers, and were primarily stationed between the Solomons and New Hebrides (Vanuatu) islands. In this area of operations, the carriers were charged with guarding the line of communication between the major Allied bases at New Caledonia and Espiritu Santo, supporting the Allied ground forces at Guadalcanal and Tulagi against any Japanese counteroffensives, covering the movement of supply ships to Guadalcanal, and engaging and destroying any Japanese warships, especially carriers, that came within range. The area of ocean in which the US carrier task forces operated was known as "Torpedo Junction" by US forces because of the high concentration of Japanese submarines in the area.

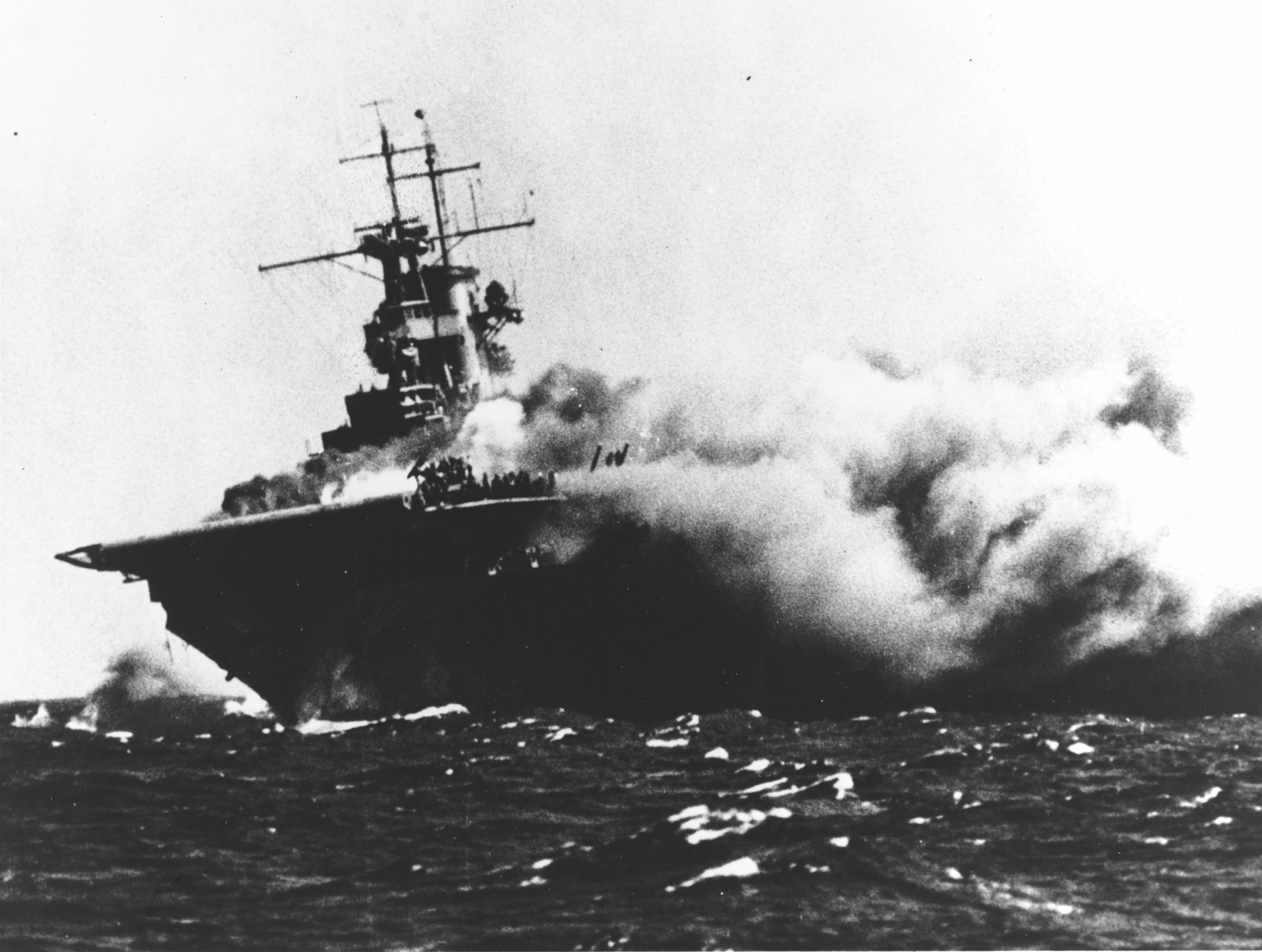
USS Wasp burns after being torpedoed on 15 September

On 31 August, Saratoga was torpedoed by Japanese submarine I-26 and was out of action for three months for repairs.

On 15 September, Wasp was hit by three torpedoes fired by Japanese submarine I-19 while supporting a major reinforcement and resupply convoy to Guadalcanal and almost engaging the Japanese carriers Shōkaku and Zuikaku, which withdrew just before the two adversaries came into range of each other's aircraft. With power knocked out from torpedo damage, Wasp's damage-control teams were unable to contain the ensuing large fires, and she was abandoned and scuttled.

Although the US now had only one operational carrier, Hornet, in the South Pacific, the Allies still maintained air superiority over the southern Solomon Islands because of their aircraft based at Henderson Field on Guadalcanal. However, at night, when aircraft were not able to operate effectively, the Japanese were able to operate their ships around Guadalcanal almost at will. Thus, a stalemate in the battle for Guadalcanal developed—the Allies delivered supplies and reinforcements to Guadalcanal during the day, and the Japanese did the same by warship, referred to as the "Tokyo Express" by the Allies, at night—with neither side able to deliver enough troops to the island to secure a decisive advantage. By mid-October, both sides had roughly an equal number of troops on the island. The stalemate was briefly interrupted by two large-ship naval actions. On the night of 11–12 October, a US naval force intercepted and defeated a Japanese naval force en route to bombard Henderson Field in the Battle of Cape Esperance. But just two nights later, a Japanese force that included the battleships Haruna and Kongō successfully bombarded Henderson Field, destroying most of the US aircraft there and inflicting severe damage on the field's facilities.

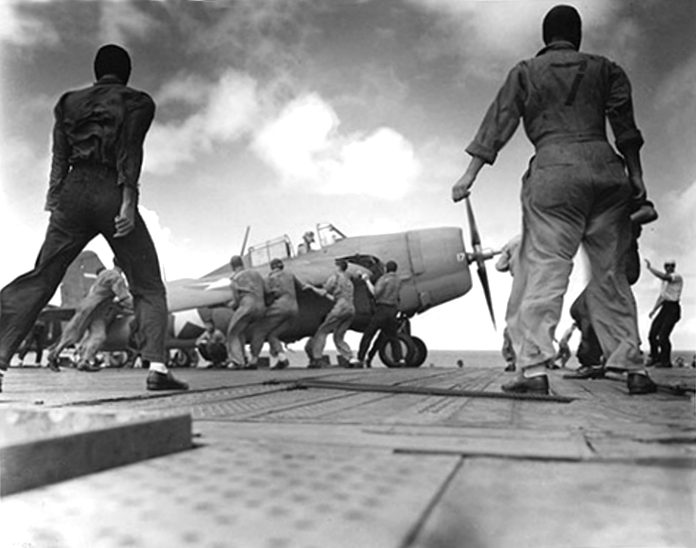
Grumman F4F Wildcat on Enterprise as she conducts air operations on 24 October

The US made two moves to try to break the stalemate in the battle for Guadalcanal. First, repairs to Enterprise were expedited so that she could return to the South Pacific as soon as possible. On 10 October, Enterprise received her new air group (Air Group 10) and on 16 October, she left Pearl Harbor; and on 23 October, she arrived back in the South Pacific and rendezvoused with Hornet and the rest of the Allied South Pacific naval forces on 24 October, 273 nmi (506 km; 314 mi) northeast of Espiritu Santo.

Second, on 18 October, Admiral Chester Nimitz, Allied Commander-in-Chief of Pacific Forces, replaced Vice Admiral Robert L. Ghormley with Vice Admiral William Halsey, Jr. as Commander, South Pacific Area: this position commanded Allied forces involved in the Solomon Islands campaign. Nimitz felt that Ghormley had become too myopic and pessimistic to lead Allied forces effectively in the struggle for Guadalcanal. Halsey was reportedly respected throughout the US naval fleet as a "fighter". Upon assuming command, Halsey immediately began making plans to draw the Japanese naval forces into a battle, writing to Nimitz, "I had to begin throwing punches almost immediately."

The Japanese Combined Fleet was also seeking to draw Allied naval forces into what was hoped to be a decisive battle. Two fleet carriers—Hiyō and Jun'yō, as well as the light carrier Zuihō—arrived at the main Japanese naval base at Truk Atoll from Japan in early October and joined Shōkaku and Zuikaku. With five carriers fully equipped with air groups, plus their numerous battleships, cruisers, and destroyers, the Japanese Combined Fleet, directed by Admiral Isoroku Yamamoto, was confident that it could make up for the defeat at the Battle of Midway. Apart from a couple of air raids on Henderson Field in October, the Japanese carriers and their supporting warships stayed in the northwestern area of the Solomon Islands, out of the battle for Guadalcanal and waiting for a chance to approach and engage the US carriers. With the Japanese Army's next planned major ground attack on Allied forces on Guadalcanal set for 20 October, Yamamoto's warships began to move towards the southern Solomons to support the offensive and to be ready to engage any enemy ships, especially carriers, that approached to support the Allied defenses on Guadalcanal.

== Prelude ==
On or around 11 October a large force consisting of aircraft carriers, battleships, and their escorts departed Truk for an extended sortie in support of an October Guadalcanal offensive. On the same day a major reinforcement convoy reached Guadalcanal, but a force of supporting heavy cruisers was prevented from bombarding Henderson Field and turned back in what became known as the Battle of Cape Esperance. What followed were three bombardments conducted by battleships and heavy cruisers between 13 October and 16 October (the heaviest naval attack on the airfield in the campaign), the first and third of those conducted by vessels detached from Vice admiral Nobutake Kondō's Advance Force. Starting midnight on 14 October, another convoy consisting of four transports unloaded the bulk of their cargo, including tanks and heavy artillery. On 15 October, the destroyer Meredith, while escorting the tug Vireo pulling a resupply barge, was spotted and sunk by aircraft from Zuikaku and Shokaku. On 17 October, Hiyō and Jun'yō launched a strike force to attack transports off Lunga Point, but caused no damage. The large body of warships would remain in the waters around Guadalcanal until after fighting in the Battle of the Santa Cruz Islands had ceased and returned to Truk at the end of October. The recently commissioned carrier Hiyō was originally part of the fleet, but a fire in her engineering room on 21 October forced her to retire to Truk for repairs. On 25 October, 6 bombers and 12 fighters from Jun'yo attacked Henderson Field, but did little damage.

From 20 to 25 October, Japanese land forces on Guadalcanal tried to capture Henderson Field in the Battle for Henderson Field with a big attack against the US defenders. The attack was defeated with heavy casualties for the Japanese. Incorrectly believing that the Japanese army troops had captured Henderson Field, the Japanese sent warships from the Shortland Islands toward Guadalcanal on the morning of 25 October to support their ground forces on the island. Aircraft from Henderson Field attacked the convoy throughout the day, sinking the light cruiser Yura (with some help from B-17s from Espiritu Santo) and damaging the destroyer Akizuki.

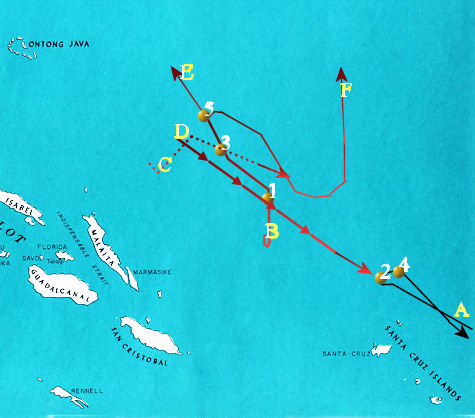
Map of the Battle of the Santa Cruz Islands, 26 October 1942. Red lines are Japanese warship forces and black lines are US carrier forces. Numbered yellow dots represent significant actions in the battle.

Despite the failure of the Japanese ground offensive and the loss of Yura, the rest of the Combined Fleet continued to maneuver near the southern Solomon Islands on 25 October in the hope of engaging Allied naval forces in a battle. The Japanese naval forces now comprised four carriers (two large, one medium, one light), Hiyō having departed due to an accidental engine fire, with a combined aircraft complement of approximately three Shokaku-class fleet carriers.

The Japanese naval forces were divided into three groups: the "Advanced" force of Jun'yō, four heavy cruisers, one light cruiser, and seven destroyers commanded by Kondō in heavy cruiser Atago with a support group consisting of two battleships and two destroyers under the command of Rear Admiral Takeo Kurita; the "Main Body" of Shōkaku, Zuikaku, and Zuihō plus one heavy cruiser and eight destroyers, commanded by Vice Admiral Chūichi Nagumo aboard Shōkaku; and the "Vanguard" force of two battleships, three heavy cruisers, one light cruiser, and seven destroyers, commanded by Rear Admiral Hiroaki Abe in the battleship Hiei. In addition to commanding the Advanced force, Kondo acted as the commander of the three forces.

On the US side, the Hornet and Enterprise task groups (Rear Admiral Thomas Kinkaid) swept around to the north of the Santa Cruz Islands on 25 October, searching for the Japanese naval forces. The US warships were deployed as two carrier groups, separated from each other by about 10 nmi (19 km; 12 mi). A US PBY Catalina reconnaissance seaplane based in the Santa Cruz Islands located the Japanese Main Body carriers at 11:03. However, the Japanese carriers were about 355 nmi (657 km; 409 mi) from the US force, just beyond carrier aircraft range. Kinkaid, hoping to close the range to attack that day, steamed towards the Japanese carriers at top speed and, at 14:25, launched a strike force of 23 aircraft. The Japanese, knowing that they had been spotted by US aircraft and not knowing where the US carriers were, turned to the north to stay out of range of the US carrier aircraft. The US strike force returned to its carriers without finding the Japanese warships.

== Battle ==
=== Carrier action on 26 October: first strikes ===
At 02:50 on 26 October, the Japanese naval forces reversed direction and the naval forces of the two adversaries closed the distance until they were only 200 nmi (370 km; 230 mi) away from each other by 05:00. Both sides launched search aircraft and prepared their remaining aircraft to attack as soon as the other side's ships were located. Although a radar-equipped Catalina sighted the Japanese carriers at 03:10, the report did not reach Kinkaid until 05:12. Therefore, believing that the Japanese ships had probably changed position during the intervening two hours, he decided to withhold launching a strike force until he received more current information on the location of the Japanese ships.

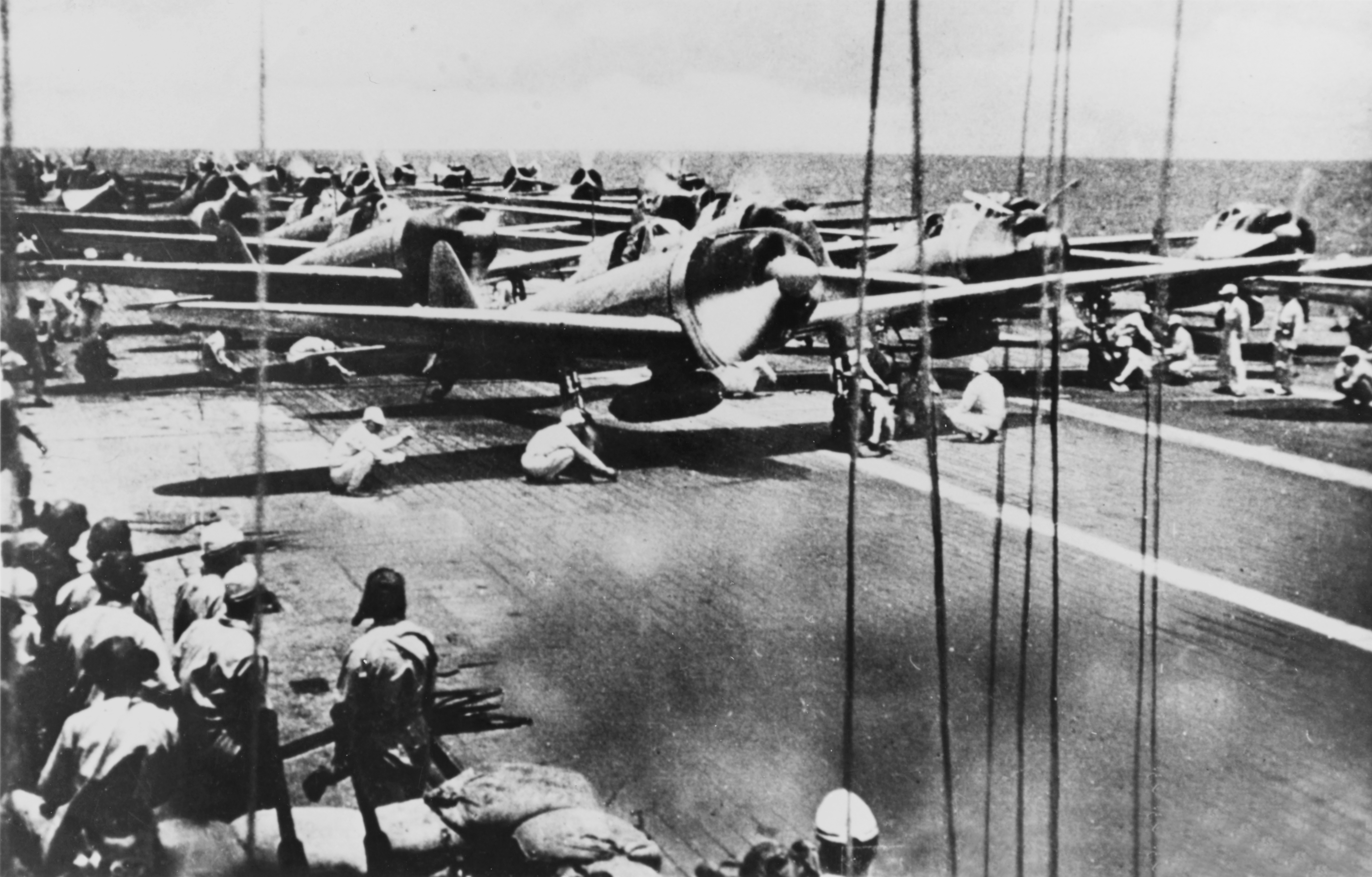
Japanese fighter and dive bomber aircraft on Shōkaku prepare to launch for an attack on US carrier forces

At 06:45, a US scout aircraft sighted the carriers of Nagumo's main body. At 06:58, a Japanese scout aircraft reported the location of Hornet's task force. Both sides raced to be the first to attack the other. The Japanese were first to get their strike force launched, with 64 aircraft, including 21 Aichi D3A2 Val dive bombers, 20 Nakajima B5N2 Kate torpedo bombers, 21 Mitsubishi A6M3 Zero fighters, and 2 Nakajima B5N2 contact aircraft on the way towards Hornet by 07:40. This first strike was commanded by Lieutenant Commander Shigeharu Murata, while the fighter cover was led by Lieutenants Ayao Shirane and Saneyasu Hidaka. Also at 07:40, two US SBD-3 Dauntless scout aircraft, responding to the earlier sighting of the Japanese carriers, arrived and dove on Zuihō. With the Japanese combat air patrol (CAP) busy chasing other US scout aircraft away, the two US aircraft were able to hit Zuihō with both their 500-pound bombs, causing heavy damage and preventing the carrier's flight deck from being able to land aircraft.

Meanwhile, Kondo ordered Abe's Vanguard force to race ahead to try to intercept and engage the US warships. Kondo also brought his own Advanced force forward at flank speed so that Jun'yō's aircraft could join in the attacks on the US ships. At 08:10, Shōkaku launched a second wave of strike aircraft, consisting of 19 dive bombers and five Zeros, and Zuikaku launched 16 torpedo bombers and 4 Zeros at 08:40. The second strike leader was Lieutenant Commander Mamoru Seki, while the fighter cover was led by Lieutenant Hideki Shingo. Thus, by 09:10 the Japanese had over 100 aircraft on the way to attack the US carriers.

The US strike aircraft were running about 20 minutes behind the Japanese. Believing that a speedy attack was more important than a massed attack, and because they lacked fuel to spend time assembling prior to the strike, the US aircraft proceeded in small groups towards the Japanese ships, rather than forming into a single large strike force. The first group—consisting of 15 Douglas SBD Dauntless dive bombers, 6 Grumman TBF-1 Avenger torpedo bombers, and eight Grumman F4F Wildcat fighters, led by Lieutenant Commander William J. "Gus" Widhelm from Hornet—was on its way by about 08:00. A second group—consisting of three SBDs, nine TBFs (including the Air Group Commander's), and eight Wildcats from Enterprise, led by Lieutenant Commander John A. Collett—was off by 08:10. A third group—consisting of nine SBDs, ten TBFs (including the Air Group Commander's), and seven F4Fs from Hornet—was on its way by 08:20.

At 08:40, the opposing aircraft strike formations passed within sight of each other. Lieutenant Hidaka's nine Zuihō Zeros surprised and attacked the Enterprise group, attacking the climbing aircraft from out of the sun. In the resulting engagement, four Zeros, three Wildcats, and two TBFs, including Collett's, were shot down, with another two TBFs and a Wildcat forced to return to Enterprise with heavy damage. The remaining Zuihō Zeros, having exhausted their ammunition, withdrew from the action.

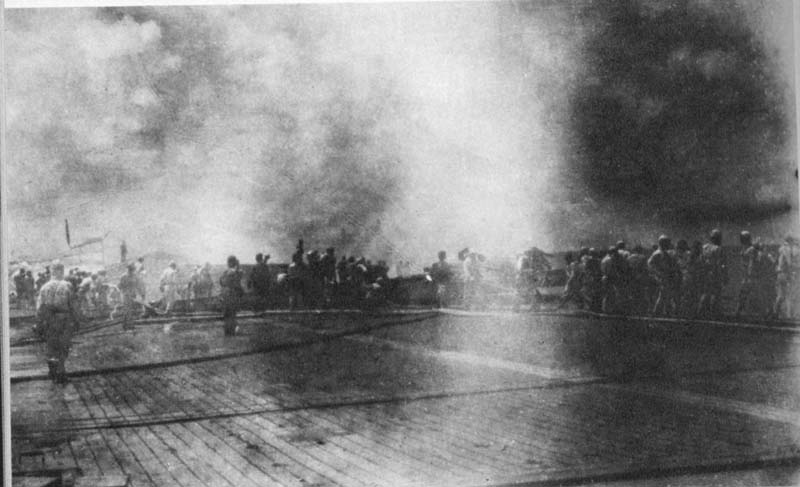
The crew of Shōkaku fights fires on the flight deck after the US attack

At 08:50, the lead US attack formation from Hornet spotted four ships from Abe's Vanguard force. Pressing on, the US aircraft sighted the Japanese carriers and prepared to attack. Three Zeros from Zuihō attacked the formation's Wildcats, drawing them away from the bombers they were assigned to protect. Thus, the dive bombers in the first group initiated their attacks without fighter escort. Twelve Zeros from the Japanese carrier CAP attacked the SBD formation, shot down two (including Widhelm's, though he survived), and forced two more to abort. The remaining 11 SBDs commenced their attack dives on Shōkaku at 09:27, hitting her with three to six bombs, wrecking her flight deck, and causing serious damage to the interior of the ship. The final SBD of the 11 lost track of Shōkaku and instead dropped its bomb near the Japanese destroyer Teruzuki, causing minor damage. The six TBFs in the first strike force, having become separated from their strike group, did not find the Japanese carriers and eventually turned back towards Hornet. On the way back, they attacked the Japanese heavy cruiser Tone, missing with all their torpedoes.

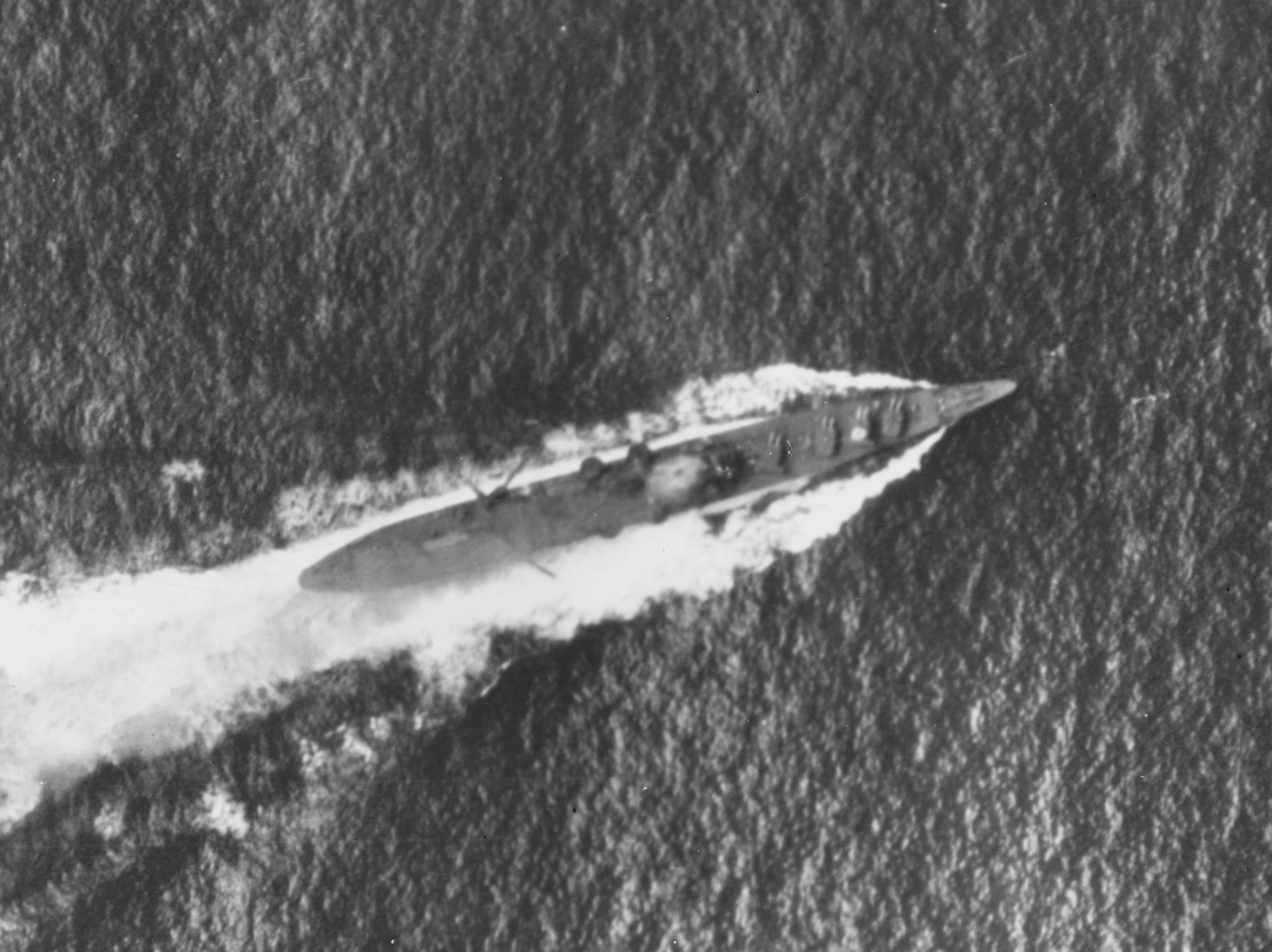
Chikuma under attack on 26 October. Smoke emerges from the center of the ship where a 1,000 lb (450 kg) bomb hit directly on the bridge

The TBFs of the second US attack formation from Enterprise were unable to locate the Japanese carriers and instead attacked the Japanese heavy cruiser Suzuya from Abe's Vanguard force but caused no damage. At about the same time, nine SBDs from the third US attack formation—from Hornet—found Abe's ships and attacked the Japanese heavy cruiser Chikuma, hitting her with two 1,000 lb (450 kg) bombs and causing heavy damage. The three Enterprise SBDs then arrived and also attacked Chikuma, causing more damage with one bomb hit and two near-misses. Finally, the nine TBFs from the third strike group arrived and attacked the smoking Chikuma, scoring one more bomb hit. Chikuma, escorted by two destroyers, withdrew from the battle and headed towards Truk for repairs.

The US carrier forces received word from their outbound strike aircraft at 08:30 that Japanese attack aircraft were headed their way. At 08:52, the Japanese strike force commander sighted the Hornet task force—the Enterprise task force was hidden by a rain squall—and deployed his aircraft for attack. At 08:55, the US carriers detected the approaching Japanese aircraft on radar—about 35 nmi (65 km; 40 mi) away—and began to vector the 37 Wildcats of their CAP to engage the incoming Japanese aircraft. However, communication problems, mistakes by the US fighter control directors, and primitive control procedures prevented all but a few of the Wildcats from engaging the Japanese aircraft before they began their attacks on Hornet. Although the US CAP, including fighter pilot Swede Vejtasa, was able to shoot down or damage several dive bombers (the formation leader Lieutenant Sadamu Takahashi had to abort the dive due to the damage), most of the Japanese aircraft commenced their attacks relatively unmolested by US fighters.

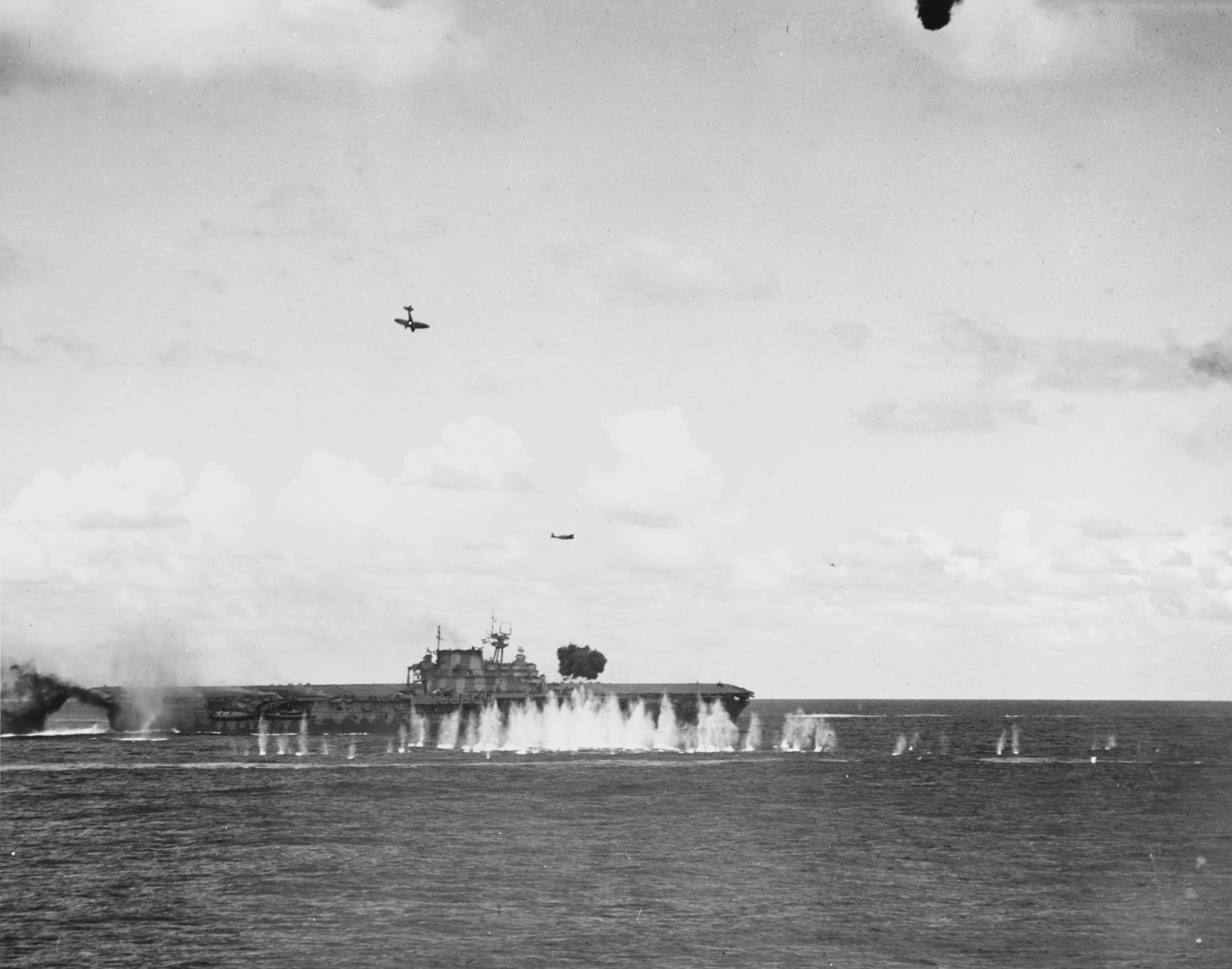
A damaged Japanese dive bomber (upper left) dives towards Hornet at 09:14 ...

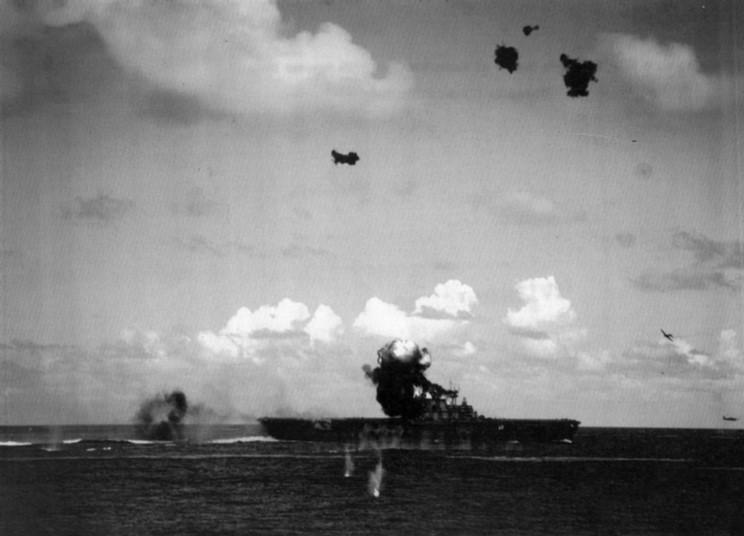
... and seconds later crashes into the carrier.

At 09:09, the anti-aircraft guns of Hornet and her escorting warships opened fire as the 20 untouched Japanese torpedo planes and remaining 16 dive bombers commenced their attacks on the carrier. At 09:12, a dive bomber placed its 250 kg semi-armor-piercing "ordinary" bomb dead center on Hornet's flight deck, across from the island, which penetrated three decks before exploding, killing 60 men. Moments later, a 242 kg high-explosive "land" bomb struck the flight deck, detonating on impact to create an 11 ft (3.4 m) hole and kill 30 men. A minute or so later, a third bomb hit Hornet near where the first bomb hit, penetrating three decks before exploding, causing severe damage but no loss of life. At 09:14, a dive bomber was set on fire by Hornet's anti-aircraft guns; the pilot, Warrant Officer Shigeyuki Sato, deliberately crashed into Hornet's stack, killing seven men and spreading burning aviation fuel over the signal deck.

At the same time as the dive bombers were attacking, the 20 torpedo bombers were also approaching Hornet from two different directions. Despite suffering heavy losses from anti-aircraft fire, including Murata, the torpedo planes planted two torpedoes in Hornet's side between 09:13 and 09:17, knocking out her engines. As Hornet came to a stop, a damaged Japanese dive bomber approached and purposely crashed into the carrier's side, starting a fire near the ship's main supply of aviation fuel. At 09:20, the surviving Japanese aircraft departed, leaving Hornet dead in the water and burning. Twenty-five Japanese and six American aircraft were destroyed in this attack, including 12 dive bombers, ten torpedo planes and at least one Zero.

With the assistance of fire hoses from three escorting destroyers, the fires on Hornet were under control by 10:00. Wounded personnel were evacuated from the carrier, and an attempt was made by the heavy cruiser USS Northampton under Captain Willard A. Kitts to tow Hornet away from the battle area. However, the effort to rig the towline took some time, and more attack waves of Japanese aircraft were inbound.

=== Carrier action on 26 October: post-first strike actions ===
Starting at 09:30, Enterprise landed many of the damaged and fuel-depleted CAP fighters and returning scout aircraft from both carriers. However, with her flight deck full, and the second wave of incoming Japanese aircraft detected on radar at 09:30, Enterprise ceased landing operations at 10:00. Fuel-depleted aircraft then began ditching in the ocean, and the carrier's escorting destroyers rescued the aircrews. One of the ditching aircraft, a damaged TBF from Enterprise's strike force that had been attacked earlier by Zeros from Zuihō, crashed into the water near the destroyer USS Porter. As Porter rescued the TBF's aircrew, she was struck by a torpedo, possibly from the ditched aircraft, causing heavy damage and killing 15 crewmen. After the task force commander ordered the destroyer scuttled, the crew was rescued by the destroyer USS Shaw which then sank Porter with gunfire (08°32′S 167°17′E).

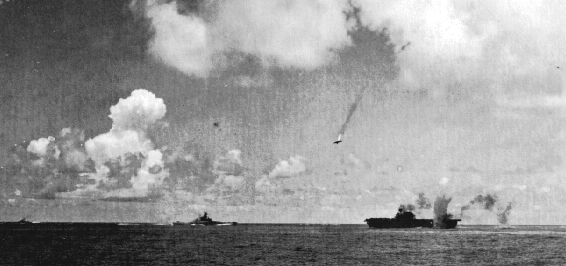
A Japanese dive bomber (center) is shot down during the attack on the Enterprise (lower right). The ship is smoking from earlier bomb hits as another bomb near-misses the carrier. The battleship South Dakota is to the left of the carrier.

As the first wave of Japanese strike aircraft began returning to their carriers from their attack on Hornet, one of them spotted the Enterprise task force, which had now emerged from the rain squall, and reported the carrier's position. The second Japanese aircraft strike wave, believing Hornet to be sinking, directed their attacks on the Enterprise task force, beginning at 10:08. Again, the US CAP had trouble intercepting the Japanese aircraft before they attacked Enterprise, shooting down only 2 of the 19 dive bombers as they began their dives on the carrier. Attacking through the intense anti-aircraft fire put up by Enterprise and her escorting warships, Seki's division attacked first and scored no hits. Next attacked the division led by Lieutenant Keiichi Arima that scored hits on the carrier with two 250 kg semi-AP "ordinary" bombs, where the first one was released by Arima's pilot, Petty Officer Kiyoto Furuta. The 2 bombs killed 44 men and wounded 75, and caused heavy damage to the carrier, including jamming her forward elevator in the "up" position. In addition, Arima's division also achieved a near-miss with another bomb. However, ten of the nineteen Japanese bombers were lost in this attack, including Seki's, with two more ditching on their return.

Twenty minutes later, the 16 Zuikaku torpedo planes arrived and split up to attack Enterprise. One group of torpedo bombers was attacked by two CAP Wildcats, again including Vejtasa, which shot down three of them and damaged a fourth. On fire, the fourth damaged aircraft purposely crashed into the destroyer Smith, setting the ship on fire and killing 57 of her crew. The torpedo carried by this aircraft detonated shortly after impact, causing more damage. The fires initially seemed out of control until Smith's commanding officer ordered the destroyer to steer into the large spraying wake of the battleship USS South Dakota, which helped put out the fires. Smith then resumed her station, firing her remaining anti-aircraft guns at the torpedo planes.

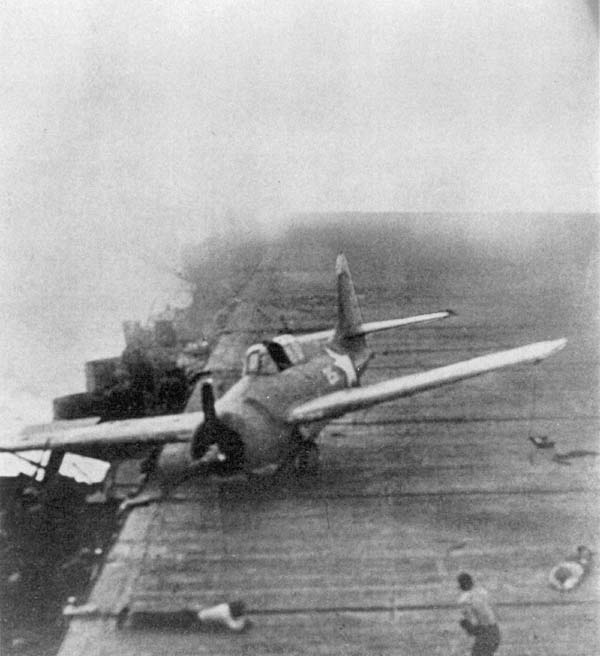
A Hornet Wildcat that had just landed skids across Enterprise's flight deck as the carrier maneuvers violently during Jun'yo's dive-bomber attack

The remaining torpedo planes attacked Enterprise, South Dakota, and the cruiser Portland, but all of their torpedoes missed or failed, causing no damage. The engagement was over at 10:53; 9 of the 16 torpedo aircraft were lost in this attack. After suppressing most of the onboard fires, at 11:15 Enterprise reopened her flight deck to begin landing returning aircraft from the morning US strikes on the Japanese warship forces. However, only a few aircraft landed before the next wave of Japanese strike aircraft arrived and began their attacks on Enterprise, forcing a suspension of landing operations.

Between 09:05 and 09:14, Jun'yō had arrived within 280 nmi (320 mi; 520 km) of the US carriers and launched a strike of 17 dive bombers and 12 Zeros, under the command of Lieutenant Yoshio Shiga. As the Japanese main body and advanced force maneuvered to try to join formations, Jun'yō readied follow-up strikes. At 11:21, the Jun'yō aircraft arrived and dove on the Enterprise task force. The dive bombers scored one near miss on Enterprise, causing more damage, and one hit each on South Dakota and light cruiser San Juan, causing moderate damage to both ships. On South Dakota, the bomb hit the number one turret though it failed to penetrate, but two men were killed and over fifty including the ship's commanding officer were wounded by fragments. Splinters from the bomb damaged the center and left gun of the number two turret, of which the gun crew was eventually informed by the Bureau of Ordnance that the gouges were deep enough that the barrels should not be fired; this was not fully repaired so it would handicap South Dakota in the later Second Naval Battle of Guadalcanal. Eight of the seventeen Japanese dive bombers were destroyed in this attack, with three more ditching on their return.

At 11:35, with Hornet out of action, Enterprise heavily damaged, and the Japanese assumed to have one or two undamaged carriers in the area, Kinkaid decided to withdraw Enterprise and her screening ships from the battle. Leaving Hornet behind, Kinkaid directed the carrier and her task force to retreat as soon as they were able. Between 11:39 and 13:22, Enterprise recovered 57 of the 73 airborne US aircraft as she retreated. The remaining US aircraft ditched in the ocean, and their aircrews were rescued by escorting warships.

Between 11:40 and 14:00, the two undamaged Japanese carriers, Zuikaku and Jun'yō, recovered the few aircraft that returned from the morning strikes on Hornet and Enterprise and prepared follow-up strikes. It was now that the devastating losses sustained during these attacks became apparent. Lt. Cmdr. Masatake Okumiya, Jun'yō's air staff officer, described the return of the carrier's first strike groups:

We searched the sky with apprehension. There were only a few planes in the air in comparison with the numbers launched several hours before... The planes lurched and staggered onto the deck, every single fighter and bomber bullet holed ... As the pilots climbed wearily from their cramped cockpits, they told of unbelievable opposition, of skies choked with antiaircraft shell bursts and tracers.

Only one of Jun'yō's bomber leaders returned from the first strike, and upon landing he appeared "so shaken that at times he could not speak coherently".

At 13:00, Kondo's Advanced force and Abe's Vanguard force warships together headed directly towards the last reported position of the US carrier task forces and increased speed to try to intercept them for a gun battle. The damaged carriers Zuihō and Shōkaku, with Nagumo still on board, retreated from the battle area, leaving Rear Admiral Kakuji Kakuta in charge of the Zuikaku and Jun'yō aircraft forces. At 13:06, Jun'yō launched her second strike of seven torpedo planes led by Lieutenant Yoshiaki Irikiin, which were escorted by eight Zeros led by Lieutenant Shirane. At the same time, Zuikaku launched her third strike of seven torpedo planes, two dive bombers, and five Zeros, under the command of Lieutenant (jg) Ichirō Tanaka. Most of the torpedo planes were armed with an 800 kg armor-piercing bomb. At 15:35, Jun'yō launched the last Japanese strike force of the day, consisting of four dive bombers and six Zeros, again under the command of Lieutenant Shiga.

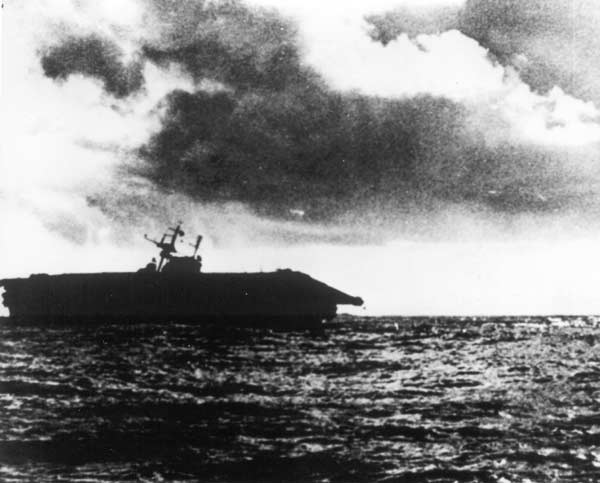
Hornet, sinking and abandoned

After several technical problems, Northampton finally began slowly towing Hornet out of the battle area at 14:45, at a speed of only five knots. Hornet's crew was on the verge of restoring partial power, but at 15:20, Jun'yō's second strike arrived, and the seven torpedo planes attacked the almost stationary carrier. Although six of the torpedo planes missed, at 15:23, one torpedo struck Hornet amidships, which proved to be the fatal blow. The torpedo hit destroyed the repairs to the power system and caused heavy flooding and a 14-degree list. With no power to pump out the water, Hornet was given up for lost, and the remaining crew abandoned ship. The third strike from Zuikaku attacked Hornet during this time, where B5N level bombers hit the sinking ship with one 800 kg bomb. All of Hornet's crewmen were off by 16:27. During the last Japanese attack of the day, a dive bomber from Jun'yō's third strike dropped one more 250 kg semi-AP bomb on the sinking carrier at 17:20.

After being informed that Japanese forces were approaching and that further towing efforts were infeasible, Halsey ordered Hornet sunk. While the rest of the US warships retired towards the southeast to get out of range of Kondō's and Abe's oncoming fleet, the destroyers USS Mustin and Anderson attempted to scuttle Hornet with multiple torpedoes and over 400 shells, but she still remained afloat. With advancing Japanese naval forces only 20 minutes away, the two US destroyers abandoned Hornet's burning hulk at 20:40. By 22:20, the rest of Kondō's and Abe's warships had arrived at Hornet's location. The destroyers Makigumo and Akigumo then finished Hornet with four 24 in (610 mm) torpedoes. At 01:35 on 27 October 1942, she finally sank, at approximately 08°38′S 166°43′E. Several night attacks by radar-equipped Catalinas on Jun'yō and Teruzuki, knowledge of the head start the US warships had in their retreat from the area, plus a critical fuel situation apparently caused the Japanese to reconsider further pursuit of the US warships. After refueling near the northern Solomon Islands, the Japanese ships returned to their main base at Truk on 30 October. During the US withdrawal from the battle area towards Espiritu Santo and New Caledonia, while taking evasive action from a Japanese submarine, South Dakota collided with the destroyer Mahan, heavily damaging Mahan.

== Aftermath ==
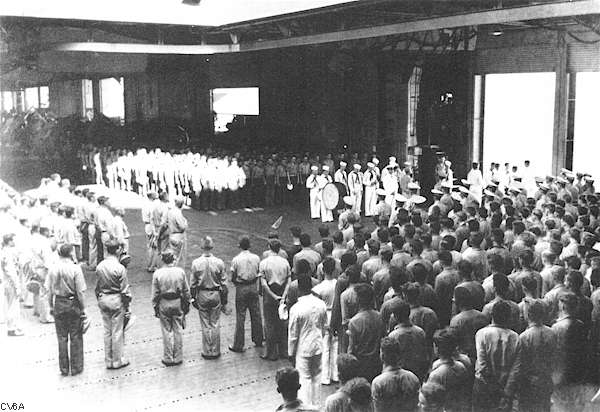
The crew of Enterprise conducts a burial at sea on 27 October for their fellow crewmen killed the day before

Both sides claimed victory. The Americans stated that two Shōkaku-class fleet carriers had been hit with bombs and eliminated. Kinkaid's summary of damage to the Japanese included hits to a battleship, three heavy cruisers, and a light cruiser, and possible hits on another heavy cruiser. In reality, Shōkaku, Zuihō, and Chikuma were the only ships hit during the battle, none of which sank. For their part, the Japanese asserted that they sank three American carriers, one battleship, one cruiser, one destroyer, and one "unidentified large warship". Actual American losses comprised the carrier Hornet and the destroyer Porter, and damage to Enterprise, the light cruiser San Juan, the destroyer Smith and the battleship South Dakota.

The loss of Hornet was a severe blow for Allied forces in the South Pacific, leaving Enterprise and Saratoga as the only operational Allied carriers in the entire Pacific theater. As Enterprise retreated from the battle, the crew posted a sign on the flight deck: "Enterprise vs Japan". Enterprise received temporary repairs at New Caledonia and, although not fully restored, returned to the southern Solomons area just two weeks later to support Allied forces during the Naval Battle of Guadalcanal. There she played an important role in what turned out to be the decisive naval engagement in the overall campaign for Guadalcanal when her aircraft sank several Japanese warships and troop transports during the naval skirmishes around Henderson Field. The lack of carriers pressed the Americans and Japanese to deploy battleships in night operations around Guadalcanal. The first engagement saw Admiral Abe's flagship Hiei crippled by American cruisers and she was abandoned after further damage from daytime air attacks including aircraft from Enterprise; Abe was relieved of command afterwards. The two fast battleships escorting Enterprise, Washington and South Dakota (which had only four out of her nine main guns operational), were detached to participate in the second night engagement that was one of only two actions in the entire Pacific War in which battleships fought each other, with South Dakota again being damaged while the Kirishima was sunk, and that defeat led to Admiral Kondo being reassigned to a lesser role.

Although the Battle of Santa Cruz was a tactical victory for the Japanese in terms of ships sunk, it came at a high cost for their naval forces, as Jun'yō was the only active aircraft carrier left to challenge Enterprise or Henderson Field for the remainder of the Guadalcanal campaign. Zuikaku, despite being undamaged and having recovered the aircraft from the two damaged carriers, returned to home islands via Truk for training and aircraft ferrying duties, returning to the South Pacific only in February 1943 to cover the evacuation of Japanese ground forces from Guadalcanal. Both damaged carriers were forced to return to Japan for extensive repairs and refitting. After repair, Zuihō returned to Truk in late January 1943. Shōkaku was under repair until March 1943 and did not return to the front until July 1943, when she was reunited with Zuikaku at Truk.

The most significant losses for the Japanese Navy were in aircrew. The US lost 81 of the 175 aircraft that were available at the start of the battle; of these, 33 were fighters, 28 were dive-bombers, and 20 were torpedo bombers. However, only 26 pilots and aircrew members were lost. The Japanese fared much worse, especially in airmen; in addition to losing 99 aircraft of the 203 involved in the battle, including 27 fighters, 40 dive bombers, and 29 torpedo bombers, they lost 148 pilots and aircrew members, including two dive bomber group leaders, three torpedo squadron leaders, and eighteen other section or flight leaders. The most notable casualties were the commanders of the first two strikes – Murata and Seki. Forty-nine percent of the Japanese torpedo bomber aircrews involved in the battle were killed, along with 39% of the dive bomber crews and 20% of the fighter pilots. The Japanese lost more aircrew at Santa Cruz than they had lost in each of the three previous carrier battles at Coral Sea (90), Midway (110), and Eastern Solomons (61). After these four major carrier battles, at least 409 of the 765 elite Japanese carrier aviators who had participated in the attack on Pearl Harbor were dead. Having lost so many of its veteran carrier aircrew, and with no quick way to replace them—because of an institutionalized limited capacity in its naval aircrew training programs and an absence of trained reserves—the undamaged Zuikaku was also ordered to return to Japan. Jun'yo remained and provided air support during the Naval Battle of Guadalcanal, Zuikaku returned just in time to cover the withdrawal of the forces from Guadalcanal.

Admiral Nagumo was relieved of command shortly after the battle and reassigned to shore duty in Japan. He acknowledged that the victory was incomplete:

[T]his battle was a tactical win, but a shattering strategic loss for Japan ... Considering the great superiority of our enemy's industrial capacity, we must win every battle overwhelmingly in order to win this war. This last one, although a victory, unfortunately, was not an overwhelming victory.

In retrospect, despite being a tactical victory, the battle effectively ended any hope the Japanese Navy might have had of scoring a decisive victory before the industrial might of the United States placed that goal out of reach. Historian Eric Hammel summed up the significance of the Battle of the Santa Cruz Islands as, "Santa Cruz was a Japanese victory. That victory cost Japan her last best hope to win the war." Military historian Dr. John Prados has dissented, while acknowledging that the Imperial Navy failed to exploit their hard-won victory, asserting that the Santa Cruz Islands was not a Pyrrhic victory for Japan, but a strategic victory:

By any reasonable measure the Battle of Santa Cruz marked a Japanese victory—and a strategic one. At its end, the Imperial Navy possessed the only operational carrier force in the Pacific. The Japanese had sunk more ships and more combat tonnage, had more aircraft remaining, and were in physical possession of the battle zone... Arguments based on aircrew losses or who owned Guadalcanal are about something else—the campaign, not the battle.

== See also ==
- Imperial Japanese Navy Air Service
- Imperial Japanese Navy in World War II
- United States Navy in World War II
- Pacific Theater aircraft carrier operations during World War II

=== World War II aircraft carrier battles ===
- Battle of the Coral Sea
- Battle of Midway
- Battle of the Eastern Solomons
- Battle of the Philippine Sea
- Battle off Cape Engaño
