= 5th Carrier Division =

Fifth Carrier Division
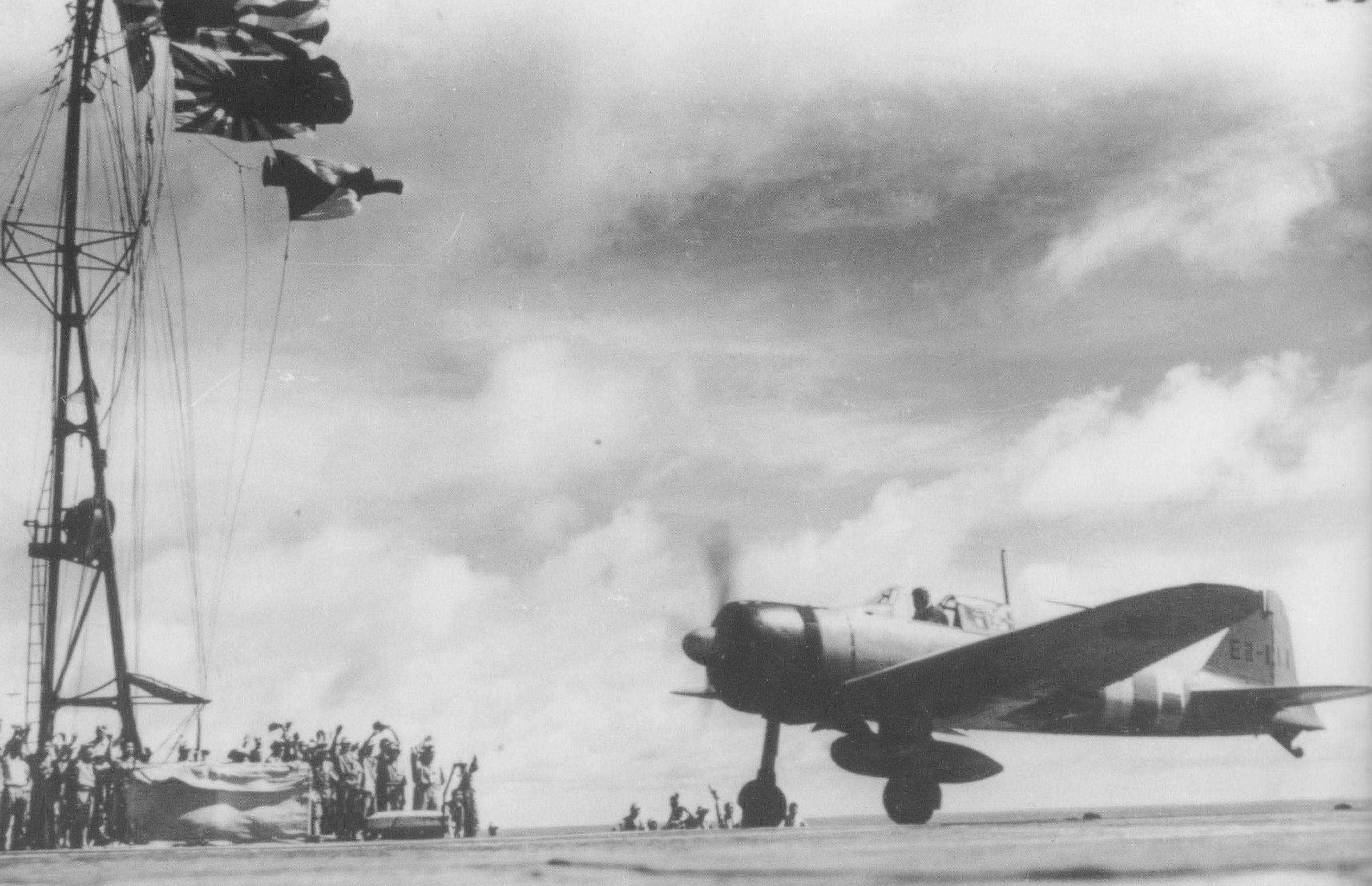
- Zuikaku and Mitsubishi A6M2b EII-111 on 8 December 1941.
- Active: August 25, 1941 – July 14, 1942
- Country: Empire of Japan
- Allegiance: Axis Powers of World War II
- Branch: Imperial Japanese Navy
- Type: Naval aviation unit
- Role: Aircraft carrier support
- Engagements: Attack on Pearl Harbor; Indian Ocean raid Battle of the Coral Sea

Commanders
- Notable commanders: Chūichi Hara

Insignia
- Identification symbol: EI (Shōkaku); EII (Zuikaku); EIII (Zuihō)

The Fifth Carrier Division (第五航空戦隊, Dai-Go Kōkū-Sentai) was an aircraft carrier unit of the Imperial Japanese Navy's First Air Fleet. At the beginning of the Pacific Campaign of World War II, the Fifth Carrier Division consisted of the fleet carriers Shōkaku and Zuikaku. These two ships participated in the attack on Pearl Harbor, using their aircraft to strafe airfields and provide fighter protection for bombers. On the way back to Japan after Pearl Harbor, the 5th Carrier Division was used to protect the main fleet from American submarines suspected of following the fleet.

Additional campaigns in which the 5th Carrier Division took part included the Battle of the Coral Sea and the Indian Ocean raid of 1942. The division experienced success with its aircraft sinking one British carrier and two British cruisers, as well as the American carrier the USS Lexington. During the Coral Sea battle, Shōkaku was damaged and needed extensive repairs, and both carriers' aviation units took heavy losses, taking the division out of action for several months. As a result, the division was not present at the Battle of Midway. After the Japanese defeat at Midway, Shōkaku and Zuikaku, along with light carrier Zuihō, were redesignated as the First Carrier Division and the Fifth Carrier Division was permanently dissolved.

== Fate ==
After the 5th was dissolved, Shōkaku and Zuikaku would fight on for several years, but neither would survive the war. Shōkaku was sunk on 19 June 1944 by the American submarine USS Cavalla (SS-244) during the Battle of the Philippine Sea. Explosions due to aviation fuel (avgas) accelerated the sinking, and she took over 1,000 men with her.

Zuikaku would fight on until 25 October 1944 when during Battle of Leyte Gulf, as flagship of the Imperial Japanese Navy with Admiral Jisaburo Ozawa on board, she was attacked and sunk by US carrier aircraft, taking 800 men with her, along with the light carrier Zuiho. Ozawa survived and transferred his flag to the light cruiser Oyodo. By that point in the war, the Japanese Navy was hampered by a lack of fuel and experienced pilots, and thus the battle would be one-sided.

== Organization ==
Date	Ships
25 August 1941 (original)	Shōkaku, Oboro, Sazanami
5 September 1941	Shōkaku, Kasuga Maru, Oboro, Sazanami
17 September 1941	Shōkaku, Kasuga Maru, Oboro, Akigumo
25 September 1941	Shōkaku, Zuikaku, Oboro, Akigumo
10 April 1942	Shōkaku, Zuikaku
20 June 1942	Shōkaku, Zuikaku, Zuihō
14 July 1942	Dissolved, all vessels were moved to the 1st Carrier Division.

== Commander ==
	Rank	Name	Date
1	R.ADM	Chūichi Hara	25 August 1941
x		vacant post	14 July 1942
x		disbanded	14 July 1942
