= Chūichi Hara =

Japanese admiral (1889-1964)

- 原 忠一
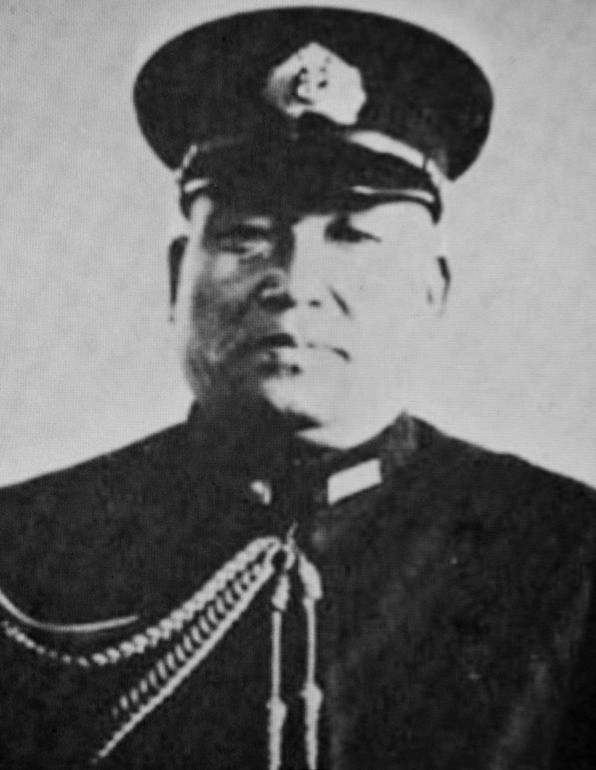
- Born: March 15, 1889; Matsue, Shimane, Empire of Japan
- Died: February 17, 1964 (aged 74); Japan
- Military career
- Allegiance: Empire of Japan
- Branch: Imperial Japanese Navy
- Service years: 1911–1945
- Rank: Vice Admiral
- Nickname: "King Kong"
- Commands: Tsuga, Ataka, Tatsuta, 5th Carrier Division, 8th Squadron, Combined Training Air Units, 11th Combined Air Group, 12th Combined Air Group, Kasumigaura Naval Air Group, 4th Fleet
- Conflicts: World War II; Pacific War; Battle of the Coral Sea; Solomon Islands campaign; Battle of the Eastern Solomons; Battle of the Santa Cruz Islands; Operation Hailstone

Chūichi Hara (原 忠一, Hara Chūichi; 15 March 1889 – 17 February 1964) was a Japanese admiral in the Imperial Japanese Navy during World War II. Heavier and taller than the average Japanese person, he was nicknamed "King Kong" by his friends earlier in his career (after 1933, when the film King Kong premiered).

== Biography ==
Hara was born in Matsue city in Shimane Prefecture. He graduated from the 39th class of the Imperial Japanese Navy Academy in 1911, ranking 85th out of his class of 149 cadets. As a midshipman, he served on the cruiser Aso and the battlecruiser Ibuki. After his promotion to ensign, he was assigned to Settsu and then to the Akashi.

After attending both torpedo school and naval artillery school, Hara was promoted to sublieutenant and then he served on the destroyer Asakaze, followed by the cruiser Yakumo, and then the battleship Kongō during World War I. However, it does not appear that he saw action.

After the end of World War I, Hara returned to naval school again for advanced study in torpedo warfare during 1918–19. Then he served as the chief torpedo officer on the destroyer Hakaze, followed by the destroyer Yukaze in 1921, and then the cruiser Ōi in 1922.

Hara attended the Naval Staff College in 1923–24 and then was promoted to lieutenant commander. In December 1926, Hara was assigned to his first command, that of the destroyer Tsuga. He was promoted to the rank of commander in 1929, and then he served as an instructor at several of the naval ordnance schools during the early 1930s. Hara was given command of the gunboat Ataka in 1932, and he was promoted to captain in 1933. During 1933–34, Hara was assigned as the naval attaché at the Japanese Embassy in Washington, D.C. When he returned to Japan, Hara took command of the cruiser Tatsuta from November 1934 to November 1935, and next he held a number of staff positions in the Imperial Japanese Navy until he was promoted to rear admiral on November 15, 1939.

== During World War II ==
During World War II, Hara was the commanding officer of the Fifth Carrier Division of the Imperial Japanese Navy for the Japanese attack on Pearl Harbor. His command contained the two brand-new aircraft carriers Zuikaku and Shōkaku.

During the Battle of Coral Sea in the South Pacific, his 5th Carrier Division successfully sank the American carrier Lexington, but Shōkaku was heavily damaged by bombs and a large number of planes and pilots from Zuikaku were lost. These damages put both aircraft carriers out of the war for many months, and they both missed the Battle of Midway. Meanwhile, Hara was reassigned to command the 8th Cruiser Division, containing the large, fast heavy cruisers Tone and Chikuma, and their escorting destroyers, during the long, bitter struggle with the Americans for the Solomon Islands. Hara and his warships were present for two large battles in the South Pacific: the Battle of the Eastern Solomons and the Battle of the Santa Cruz Islands.

During the Battle of the Eastern Solomons, light carrier Ryūjō was detached from Chuichi Nagumo's main carrier force and assigned to Hara's division with the task of attacking Henderson Field on Guadalcanal. Hara sent a strike force, consisting of six Nakajima B5N bombers and 15 Mitsubishi A6M Zero fighters, which inflicted minor damage to the Allied airbase. Soon afterwards, USN aircraft from Enterprise and Saratoga found and sunk Ryūjō. This was the last time Hara commanded a task force that included a carrier in a battle.

After the large American carrier air attack on the large Japanese base at Truk (Operation Hailstone) in 1944, Admiral Hara was assigned to replace Admiral Masami Kobayashi as the commanding officer of the Japanese "4th Fleet", though he actually commanded the land base at Truk with no warships assigned to him. Truk was left behind by the U.S. Navy in a rear area to "wither on the vine" in isolation, rather than being invaded and occupied. (This was the fate of many Japanese bases on Pacific islands, including the large one at Rabaul and several on New Guinea.) Admiral Hara was trapped at Truk without reinforcements or fresh supplies all the way through the final surrender of Japan on September 2, 1945. Following the end of the War in the Pacific, Hara was arrested by authorities of the U.S. Navy and then taken back to Japan to be held in the Sugamo Prison in Tokyo because he had been accused of war crimes. Hara was sent to face a military tribunal on the American island of Guam, and there he was convicted along with other Japanese officers of "neglect of duty in connection with violations of the Laws of War committed by members of their command" for allowing the execution of U.S. Navy aircrewmen who had been captured during air raids on Truk. Since he was the commander of the atoll, Vice Admiral Hara was of course the highest-ranking officer from Truk to be tried for war crimes. Hara was convicted, and he was sentenced to six years in prison. He was then sent back to Sugamo Prison to serve his imprisonment.

Hara's son Nobuaki graduated from the Imperial Japanese Naval Academy just as World War II ended. When Hara was released from prison on April 19, 1951, Nobuaki took him home to a very small house in Tokyo. Hara dedicated the remainder of his life to securing Japanese government pensions and relief for the families of Japanese, Korean, and Taiwanese servicemen imprisoned for war crimes. Hara served as a Councilor of the Ministry of Justice (Japan) until his death at age 74 in 1964.

== Hara's sword ==
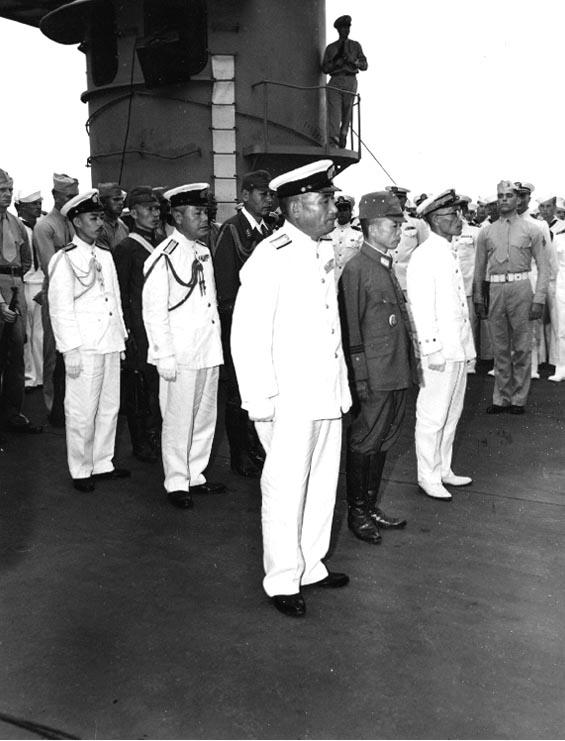
Vice Admiral Chūichi Hara (center) surrenders Japanese forces on Truk aboard USS Portland, 2 September 1945.

Shortly after the surrender in August 1945, the commander of Allied forces ordered all Japanese swords collected and turned over to the occupation forces. Many of the swords were mass-produced government issue, but some were ancient masterpieces of the swordmakers' art which had been cherished for generations. Many swords were distributed indiscriminately to American servicemen as souvenirs. Hara surrendered his family sword to the American Vice Admiral commanding the Marianas so the sword might be displayed at the United States Naval Academy Museum in Annapolis. Hara was in possession of a second sword which he presented to Rear Admiral Calvin T. Durgin while Durgin was interviewing Hara as part of the United States Strategic Bombing Survey conducted immediately following the war.

In 1959, Hara requested through diplomatic channels return of a family sword belonging to 85-year-old Ryūtarō Takahashi, president of the six-million-member Bereaved Families Association. The sword was one of the great blades forged in Bizen Province in the 15th century. It had been carried by Ryūtarō's son, Hikoya Takahashi. Hikoya had asked Hara to care for the sword while he was assigned to a minesweeping assignment he did not survive. Hara revealed that the sword carefully preserved in the Naval Academy Museum was Takahashi's sword, and the Hara family sword which should have been in the museum was in the possession of Admiral Durgin. Retired Admiral Durgin drove to the museum to correct the error, and the Bizen sword was delivered to the old man who had lost his son.

== Portrayal in media ==
Chūichi Hara appeared in the 1970 film Tora! Tora! Tora! and was portrayed by Japanese actor Kan Nihonyanagi.

Military offices
Preceded by Kobayashi Masami	Commander-in-chief of the 4th Fleet; 19 February 1944 - 2 September 1945	Succeeded by None; Fleet Dissolved
