= 1st Air Fleet =

Imperial Japanese Navy unit during the Pacific War

1st Air Fleet (IJNAS)
- 第一航空艦隊 (Daiichi Kōkū Kantai)
- Rising Sun Flag
- Active: 10 April 1941 – 14 July 1942; 1 June 1943 – 15 June 1945
- Country: Empire of Japan
- Allegiance: Emperor of Japan
- Branch: Imperial Japanese Navy
- Type: Naval Air Fleet (Kantai)
- Engagements: Pacific War; Pearl Harbor; Wake Island; Rabaul; Darwin; Indian Ocean; Coral Sea; Midway; Eastern Solomons; Santa Cruz; Philippine Sea; Leyte Gulf

Commanders
- Notable commanders: Chūichi Nagumo

Insignia
- Roundel

The 1st Air Fleet (第一航空艦隊, Daiichi Kōkū Kantai), also known as the Kidō Butai ("Mobile Force"), was a combined carrier battle group comprising most of the aircraft carriers and carrier air groups of the Imperial Japanese Navy (IJN) during the first eight months of the Pacific War.

At the time of its attack on Pearl Harbor, in December 1941, the 1st Air Fleet was the world's largest fleet of aircraft carriers.

In its second generation, 1st Air Fleet was a land-based fleet of "kichi kōkūtai" (base air unit[s]).

== Origins ==
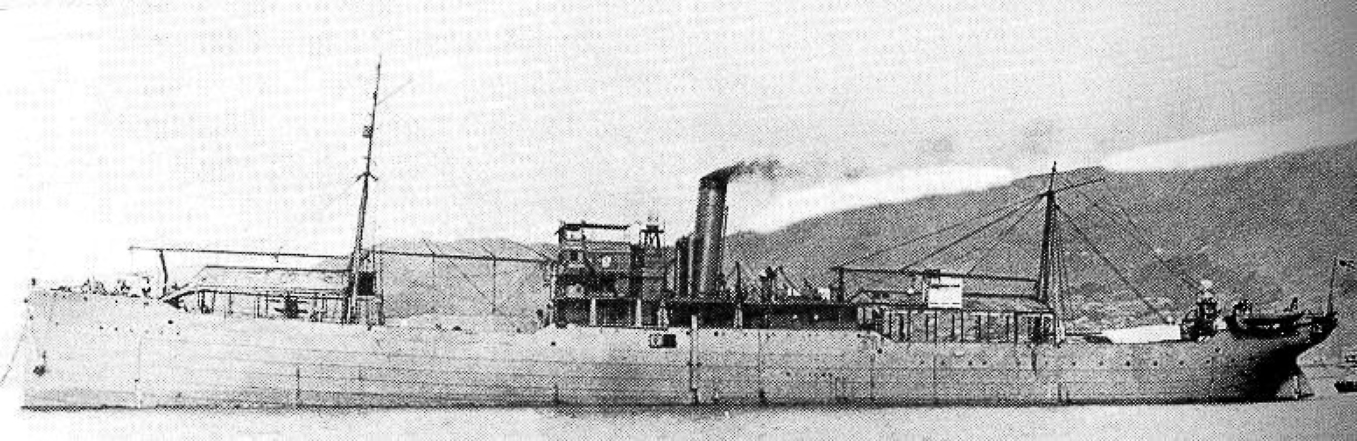
Japanese seaplane carrier Wakamiya.

In 1912, the British Royal Navy had established its own flying branch, the Royal Naval Air Service (RNAS). The IJN was modeled on the Royal Navy and the IJN Admiralty sought establishment of their own Naval Air Service. The IJN had also observed technical developments in other countries and saw military potential of the airplane. In 1913, the IJN seaplane carrier Wakamiya was converted into a seaplane tender and aircraft were purchased. The 1st and 2nd Air Fleet were to be the primary attack force of the IJNAS.

The Japanese carriers' experiences off China had helped further develop the IJN's carrier doctrine. One lesson learned in China was the importance of force concentration and mass in projecting naval air power ashore. Therefore, in April 1941 the IJN formed the 1st Air Fleet to combine all of its fleet carriers under a single command. The IJN centered its doctrine on air strikes that combined the air groups within carrier divisions, rather than each individual carrier. When more than one carrier division was operating together, the divisions' air groups were combined with each other. This doctrine of combined, massed, carrier air attack groups was the most advanced of its kind of all the world's navies. The IJN, however, remained concerned that concentrating all of its carriers together would render them vulnerable to being wiped out all at once by a massive enemy air or surface strike. Thus, the IJN developed a compromise solution in which the fleet carriers would operate closely together within their carrier divisions but the divisions themselves would operate in loose rectangular formations, with approximately 7,000 metres (7,700 yd) separating the carriers from each other. (Note: According to Parshall and Tully, pp. 86–87, the Japanese would not usually launch their entire carrier air groups into a single massed attack. Instead, each carrier would launch a "deckload strike" of all its aircraft that could be spotted at one time on each flight deck. Subsequent attack waves consisted of the next deckload of aircraft. Thus, 1st Air Fleet air attacks would often consist of at least two, massed waves of aircraft. Peattie (p. 152) and Jisaburō Ozawa (Goldstein, pp. 78–80) emphasize that the First Air Fleet was not the IJN's primary strategic striking force. The IJN still considered the First Air Fleet an integral component in the Combined Fleet's decisive battle task force centered on battleships.)

Although the concentration of so many fleet carriers into a single unit was a new and revolutionary offensive strategic concept, the First Air Fleet suffered from several defensive deficiencies which gave it, in Mark Peattie's words, a "'glass jaw': it could throw a punch but couldn't take one." Japanese carrier anti-aircraft guns and associated fire control systems had several design and configuration deficiencies which limited their effectiveness. The IJN's fleet combat air patrol (CAP) consisted of too few fighter aircraft and was hampered by an inadequate early warning system, including a lack of radar. Poor radio communications with the fighter aircraft inhibited effective command and control of the CAP. The carriers' escorting warships were deployed as visual scouts in a ring at long range, not as close anti-aircraft escorts, as they lacked training, doctrine, and sufficient anti-aircraft guns. These deficiencies would eventually doom Kaga and other First Air Fleet carriers.

== Organization ==
=== As a Carrier-Based Fleet ===
The First Air Fleet (Dai-ichi Kōkū Kantai) was a major component of the Combined Fleet (Rengō Kantai). When created on 10 April 1941, it had three kōkū sentai (air flotillas; in the case of aircraft carriers, carrier divisions): On that date, First Kōkū Sentai consisted of Akagi and Kaga and their aircraft units. Later that spring, a number of destroyers were added. On 10 April 1941, Second Kōkū Sentai comprised Sōryū, Hiryū and the 23rd Kuchikutai (Destroyer Unit). Fourth Kōkū Sentai consisted solely of light carrier Ryūjō and her aircraft unit, until two destroyers were added in August. (At its inception, First Air Fleet did not include Third Kōkū Sentai and it did not include it on 7 December 1941. Third Kōkū Sentai (3rd Carrier Division, see table below) was attached to First Fleet, as distinct from First Air Fleet. On 1 April 1942, Third Kōkū Sentai was disbanded.Imperial Flattops) See the table titled "Transition", below.

When formed on 10 April 1941, First Air Fleet was a naval battlegroup with the single most powerful concentration of carrier-based aircraft in the world at the time. Military historian Gordon Prange called it "a revolutionary and potentially formidable instrument of sea power."

Fifth Kōkū Sentai (5th Carrier Division) was created on 1 September 1941 and was added to First Air Fleet The Naval Data Base:航空戦隊.. When the new aircraft carrier Zuikaku was added to Fifth Kōkū Sentai, First Air Fleet consisted of Akagi, Kaga, Sōryū, Hiryū, Ryūjō, Kasuga Maru (renamed Taiyō ca. 31 August 1942), Shōkaku and Zuikaku, along with their aircraft units and a number of destroyers. On 25 September 1941, Kasuga Maru was transferred from Fifth Kōkū Sentai to Fourth Kōkū Sentai.Imperial Flattops (Kasuga Maru was used to ferry aircraft to distant Japanese bases and should not be considered a front-line aircraft carrier. The status of any aircraft unit that she may have had is unclear.Imperial Flattops) Light carrier Shōhō was added to Fourth Kōkū Sentai on 22 December 1941.Imperial lattops She was destroyed on 7 May 1942 in the Battle of the Coral Sea.Imperial lattops Akagi, Kaga, Sōryū, and Hiryū were lost in the Battle of Midway.

Each Kōkū Sentai of First Air Fleet tended to include a pair of aircraft carriers, and each included the respective hikōkitai/hikōtai (aircraft/aviation unit(s)) of each aircraft carrier. Each Kōkū Sentai of First Air Fleet was a tactical unit that could be deployed separately or combined with other Kōkū Sentai of First Air Fleet, depending on the mission. For example, for operations against New Britain and New Guinea in January 1942, First Kōkū Sentai and Fifth Kōkū Sentai participated.

The number (from approximately two dozen up to approximately 80 aircraft) and type of aircraft varied, based on the capacity of the aircraft carrier. The large fleet carriers had three types of aircraft; fighters, level/torpedo bombers, and dive bombers. The smaller carriers tended to have only two types of aircraft, fighters and torpedo bombers.

At the beginning of the Pacific War, First Air Fleet included six fleet carriers: Akagi, Kaga, Sōryū, Hiryū, Shōkaku, and Zuikaku, and two light carriers: Ryūjō and Kasuga Maru (later renamed Taiyō), as shown in the table below.

On 14 July 1942, First Air Fleet was converted into Third Fleet (第三艦隊) and Eighth Fleet (第八艦隊), and 2nd Carrier Division (first generation) and 5th Carrier Division were disbanded. On the same date, the Japanese Navy's front-line aircraft carriers and their aircraft units came under the command of the 3rd Fleet, which was created in its sixth generation on that date.

==== Kidō Butai ====
The Kidō Butai (機動部隊, Mobile Strike Force) was the Combined Fleet's tactical term for its combined carrier battle groups. The title was used as a term of convenience; it was not a formal name for the organization. It consisted of Japan's six largest carriers, carrying the 1st Air Fleet. This mobile task force was created for the attack on Pearl Harbor under Vice-Admiral Chūichi Nagumo in 1941. For the attack, the Kidō Butai consisted of six aircraft carriers (commanded by Chūichi Nagumo, Tamon Yamaguchi and Chūichi Hara) with 414 airplanes, two battleships, three cruisers, nine destroyers, eight tankers, 23 submarines, and four midget submarines. These escort ships were borrowed from other fleets and squadrons. It was the most powerful naval fleet until four of the six aircraft carriers of the unit were destroyed in the disastrous Battle of Midway.

| Carriers of the Kidō Butai, 1941 |
1st Carrier Division
| Akagi |
| Kaga |
2nd Carrier Division
| Sōryū |
| Hiryū |
3rd Carrier Division
| Zuihō |
| Hōshō |
4th Carrier Division
| Ryūjō |
| Taiyō |
5th Carrier Division
| Shōkaku |
| Zuikaku |

==== Transition (extract) ====
| Date | Lower units | Lowest units and ships |
|---|---|---|
| 10 April 1941 (original) | 1st Carrier Division | Akagi, Kaga |
| 10 April 1941 (original) | 1st Carrier Division | Destroyer Division 7: Akebono, Ushio |
| 10 April 1941 (original) | 2nd Carrier Division | Sōryū, Hiryū |
| 10 April 1941 (original) | 2nd Carrier Division | Destroyer Division 23: Kikuzuki, Uzuki |
| 10 April 1941 (original) | 4th Carrier Division | Ryūjō |
| 10 December 1941 | 1st Carrier Division | Akagi, Kaga |
| 10 December 1941 | 1st Carrier Division | Destroyer Division 7: Akebono, Ushio |
| 10 December 1941 | 2nd Carrier Division | Sōryū, Hiryū |
| 10 December 1941 | 2nd Carrier Division | Destroyer Division 23: Kikuzuki, Uzuki |
| 10 December 1941 | 4th Carrier Division | Ryūjō, Taiyō |
| 10 December 1941 | 4th Carrier Division | Destroyer Division 3: Shiokaze, Hokaze |
| 10 December 1941 | 5th Carrier Division | Shōkaku, Zuikaku, Oboro, Akigumo |
| 10 April 1942 | 1st Carrier Division | Akagi, Kaga |
| 10 April 1942 | 2nd Carrier Division | Hiryū, Sōryū |
| 10 April 1942 | 4th Carrier Division | Ryūjō, Shōhō |
| 10 April 1942 | 5th Carrier Division | Shōkaku, Zuikaku |
| 10 April 1942 | 10th Cruiser-Destroyer Squadron | Nagara |
| 10 April 1942 | 10th Cruiser-Destroyer Squadron | Destroyer Division 4: Nowaki, Arashi, Hagikaze, Maikaze |
| 10 April 1942 | 10th Cruiser-Destroyer Squadron | Destroyer Division 10: Kazagumo, Makigumo, Yūgumo, Akigumo |
| 10 April 1942 | 10th Cruiser-Destroyer Squadron | Destroyer Division 17: Urakaze, Isokaze, Tanikaze, Hamakaze |
| 14 July 1942 | disbanded | |

==== Commanders ====
Commander-in-Chief

| No. | Portrait | Commander-in-Chief | Took office | Left office | Time in office |
|---|---|---|---|---|---|
| 1 | Chūichi Nagumo南雲 忠一 | Vice Admiral; Chūichi Nagumo 南雲 忠一 (1887–1944) | 10 April 1941 | 14 July 1942 | 1 year, 95 days |

Chief of Staff

| No. | Portrait | Chief of Staff | Took office | Left office | Time in office |
|---|---|---|---|---|---|
| 1 | Ryūnosuke Kusaka草鹿 龍之介 | Rear Admiral; Ryūnosuke Kusaka 草鹿 龍之介 (1893–1971) | 10 April 1941 | 14 July 1942 | 1 year, 95 days |

=== As a Land-Based Air Fleet ===
On 1 July 1943, the 1st Air Fleet was recreated as a land-based air fleet. It was intended to consist of nearly 1,600 aircraft when completed but the war situation prevented it from reaching that figure and the second generation of this fleet began with only two Kōkūtai: Dai 261 Kaigun Kōkūtai (a one-month-old Zerosen unit) and Dai 761 Kaigun Kōkūtai, a bomber unit that was created on the same day as the fleet. On 30 September 1943, a cabinet meeting planned the Absolute National Defense Zone (絶対国防圏, Zettai Kokubōken) strategy. The plan intended the Kuril Islands, Bonin Islands, Mariana Islands, Caroline Islands, Biak, Sunda Islands and Burma to be unsinkable aircraft carriers. The 1st Air Fleet became the main force of this plan but it was defeated in the Battle of the Philippine Sea. The IJN then moved the air fleet to the Philippines to regroup. Due partly to the aircrews' lack of combat experience, the air fleet suffered severe losses in the Formosa Air Battle The only tactic left for them was the kamikaze attack.

==== Transition (extract) ====
| Date | Higher unit | Lower units | Lowest units |
|---|---|---|---|
| 1 July 1943 | Imperial General Headquarters | | 261st NAG (Naval Air Group or Naval Aviation Group), 761st NAG |
| 1 January 1944 | Imperial General Headquarters | | 121st NAG, 261st NAG, 263rd NAG, 265th NAG, 321st NAG, 341st NAG, 344th NAG, 521st NAG, 523rd NAG, 1021st NAG |
| 15 February 1944 | Combined Fleet | 61st Air Flotilla | 121st NAG, 261st NAG, 263rd NAG, 321st NAG, 341st NAG, 343rd NAG, 521st NAG, 523rd NAG, 761st NAG, 1021st NAG |
| 15 February 1944 | Combined Fleet | 62nd Air Flotilla | 141st NAG, 262nd NAG, 265th NAG, 322nd NAG, 345th NAG, 361st NAG, 522nd NAG, 524th NAG, 541st NAG, 762nd NAG |
| 5 May 1944 | Combined Fleet | 22nd Air Flotilla | 151st NAG, 202nd NAG, 251st NAG, 253rd NAG, 301st NAG, 503rd NAG, 551st NAG, 755th NAG |
| 5 May 1944 | Combined Fleet | 26th Air Flotilla | 201st NAG, 501st NAG, 751st NAG |
| 5 May 1944 | Combined Fleet | 61st Air Flotilla | 121st NAG, 261st NAG, 263rd NAG, 321st NAG, 341st NAG, 343rd NAG, 521st NAG, 523rd NAG, 763rd NAG, 1021st NAG |
| 7 August 1944 | Southwest Area Fleet | 22nd Air Flotilla | Higashi-Caroline NAG |
| 7 August 1944 | Southwest Area Fleet | 23rd Air Flotilla | Gōhoku NAG |
| 7 August 1944 | Southwest Area Fleet | 26th Air Flotilla | Hitō NAG |
| 7 August 1944 | Southwest Area Fleet | 61st Air Flotilla | Mariana NAG, Nishi-Caroline NAG |
| 7 August 1944 | Southwest Area Fleet | | 153rd NAG, 201st NAG, 761st NAG, 1021st NAG |
| 15 December 1944 | Southwest Area Fleet | 23rd Air Flotilla | Gōhoku NAG |
| 15 December 1944 | Southwest Area Fleet | 26th Air Flotilla | Hokuhi NAG, Chūhi NAG, Nanpi NAG |
| 15 December 1944 | Southwest Area Fleet | | 153rd NAG, 201st NAG, 761st NAG, 1021st NAG |
| 1 March 1945 | Southwest Area Fleet | 26th Air Flotilla | Hokuhi NAG, Chūhi NAG, Nanpi NAG, 141st NAG, 153rd NAG, 201st NAG, 221st NAG, 341st NAG, 761st NAG, 763rd NAG |
| 1 March 1945 | Southwest Area Fleet | | Taiwan NAG, 132nd NAG, 133rd NAG, 165th NAG, 634th NAG, 765th NAG, 1021st NAG |
| 8 May 1945 | Combined Fleet | | 132nd NAG, 133rd NAG, 205th NAG, 765th NAG |
| 15 June 1945 | disbanded | | |

==== Commanders ====
Commanders-in-Chief

| No. | Portrait | Commander-in-Chief | Took office | Left office | Time in office |
|---|---|---|---|---|---|
| 1 | Kakuji Kakuta角田 覚治 | Vice Admiral; Kakuji Kakuta 角田 覚治 (1890–1944) | 1 July 1943 | 2 August 1944 † | 1 year, 32 days |
| 2 | Kinpei Teraoka [ja]寺岡謹平 | Vice Admiral; Kinpei Teraoka 寺岡謹平 (1891–1984) | 7 August 1944 | 20 October 1944 | 74 days |
| 3 | Takijirō Ōnishi大西 瀧治郎 | Vice Admiral; Takijirō Ōnishi 大西 瀧治郎 (1891–1945) | 20 October 1944 | 10 May 1945 | 202 days |
| 4 | Kiyohide Shima志摩 清英 | Vice Admiral; Kiyohide Shima 志摩 清英 (1890–1973) | 10 May 1945 | 15 June 1945 | 36 days |

Chiefs of Staff

| No. | Portrait | Chief of Staff | Took office | Left office | Time in office |
|---|---|---|---|---|---|
| 1 | Yoshitake Miwa [ja]三和義勇 | Captain / Rear Admiral; Yoshitake Miwa 三和義勇 (1899–1944) | 1 July 1943 | 2 August 1944 † | 1 year, 32 days |
| 2 | Toshihiko Odawara [ja]小田原俊彦 | Captain; Toshihiko Odawara 小田原俊彦 (1899–1945) | 7 August 1944 | 1 January 1945 | 147 days |
| 3 | Tomozō Kikuchi [ja]菊池朝三 | Rear Admiral; Tomozō Kikuchi 菊池朝三 (1896–1988) | 1 January 1945 | 10 May 1945 | 129 days |
| 4 | Tasuku Nakazawa [ja]中澤佑 | Rear Admiral; Tasuku Nakazawa 中澤佑 (1894–1977) | 10 May 1945 | 15 June 1945 | 36 days |

Some of the commanders of the Kidō Butai
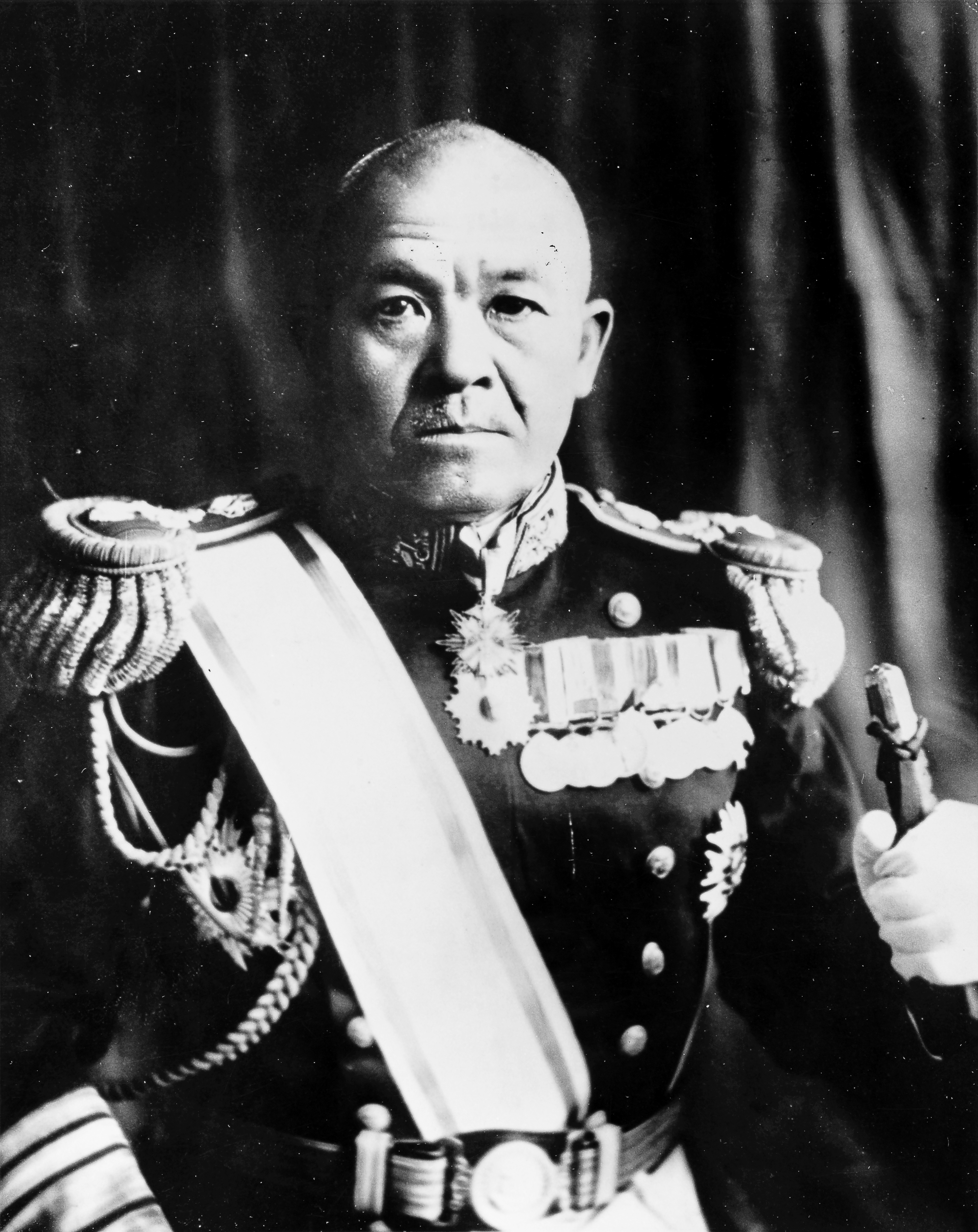
Admiral Chūichi Nagumo (Commander-in-Chief, 1st Carrier Division)

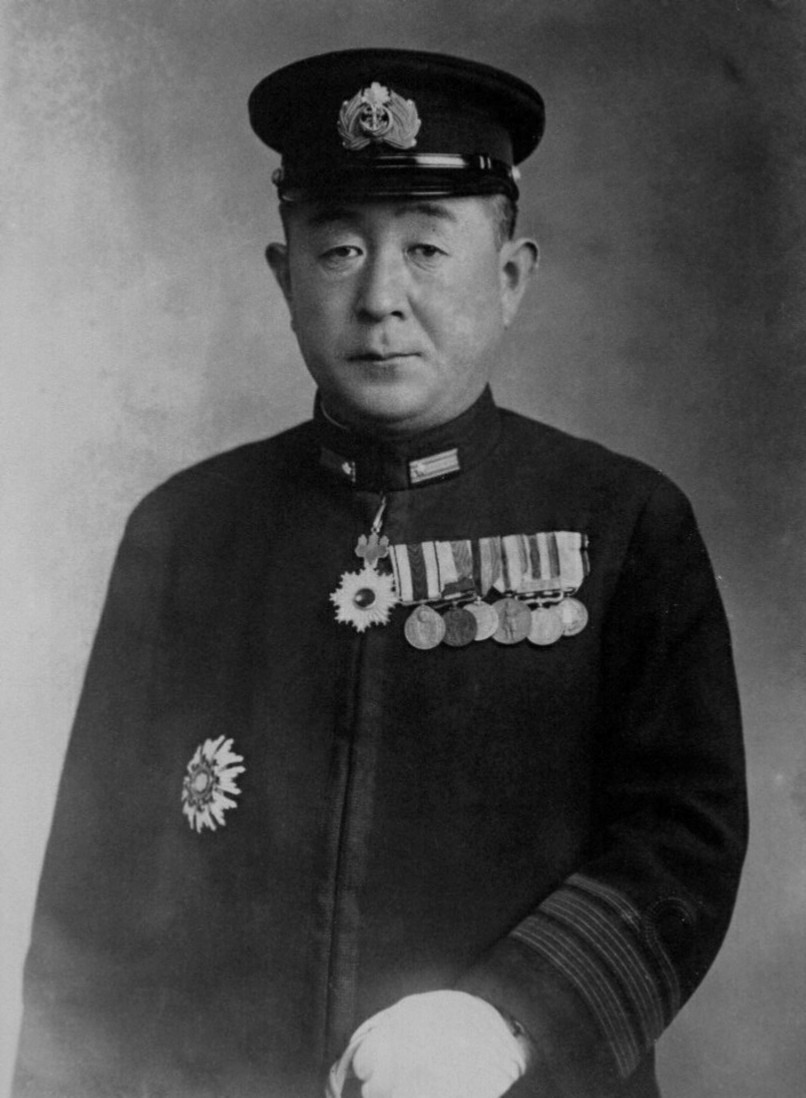
Vice Admiral Tamon Yamaguchi (2nd Carrier Division)

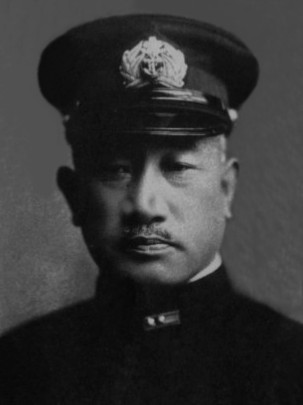
Vice Admiral Kakuji Kakuta (4th Carrier Division - from 1941)

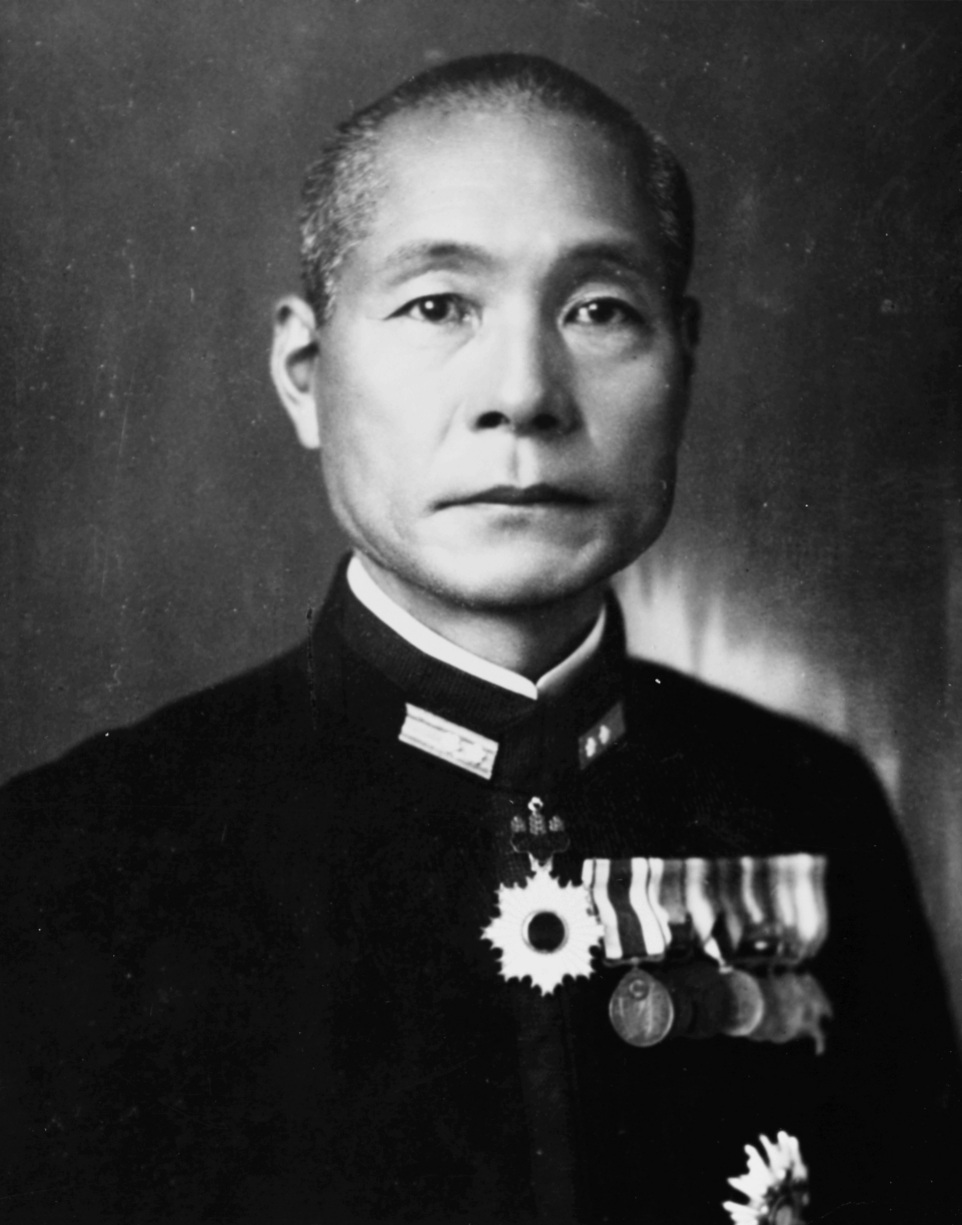
Vice Admiral Gunichi Mikawa (3rd Battleship Division)

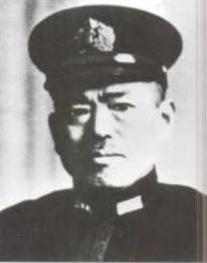
Vice Admiral Sentarō Ōmori (1st Destroyer Squadron)

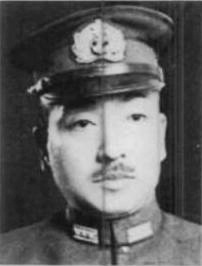
Vice Admiral Shigeyoshi Miwa (3rd Submarine Squadron)

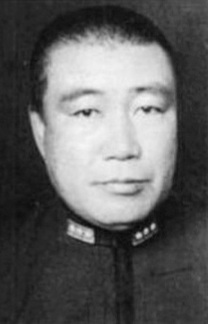
Vice Admiral Ryūnosuke Kusaka (Chief of staff, 1st Air Fleet)

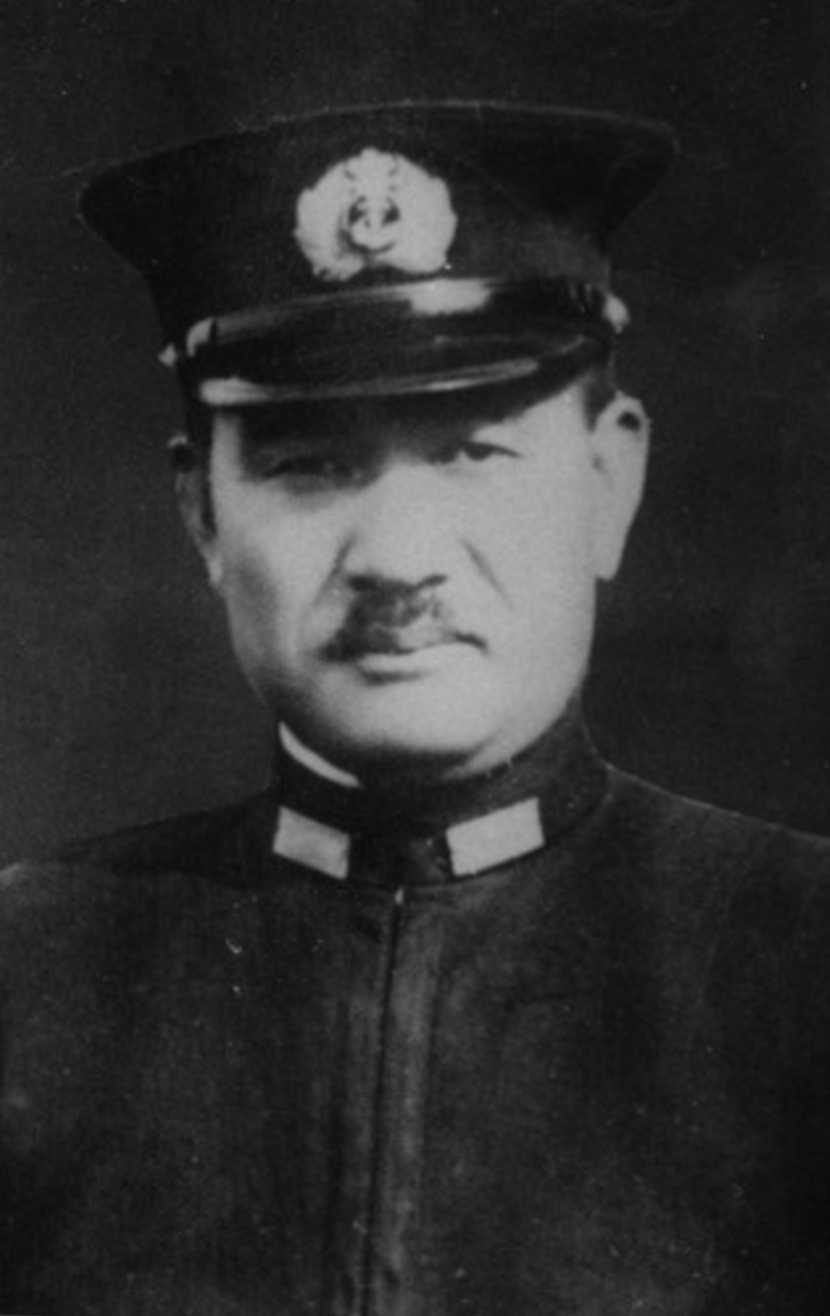
Rear Admiral Tomeo Kaku (2nd Carrier Division: Hiryu)

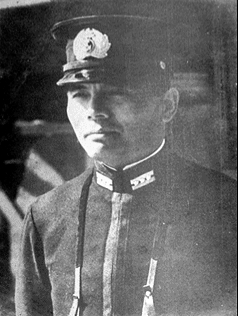
Rear Admiral Ryusaku Yanagimoto (2nd Carrier Division: Soryu)

== Operations ==
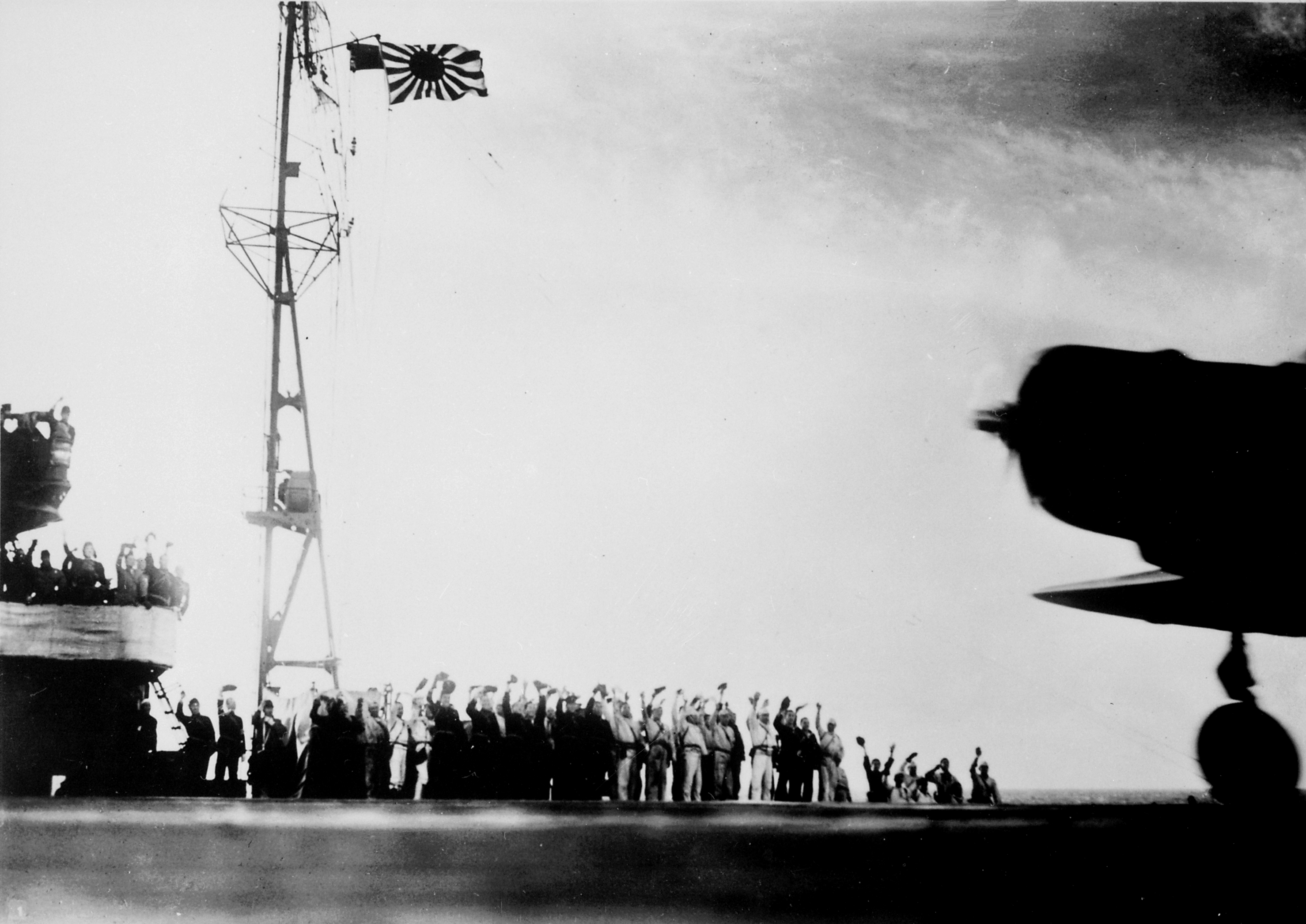
Planes taking off

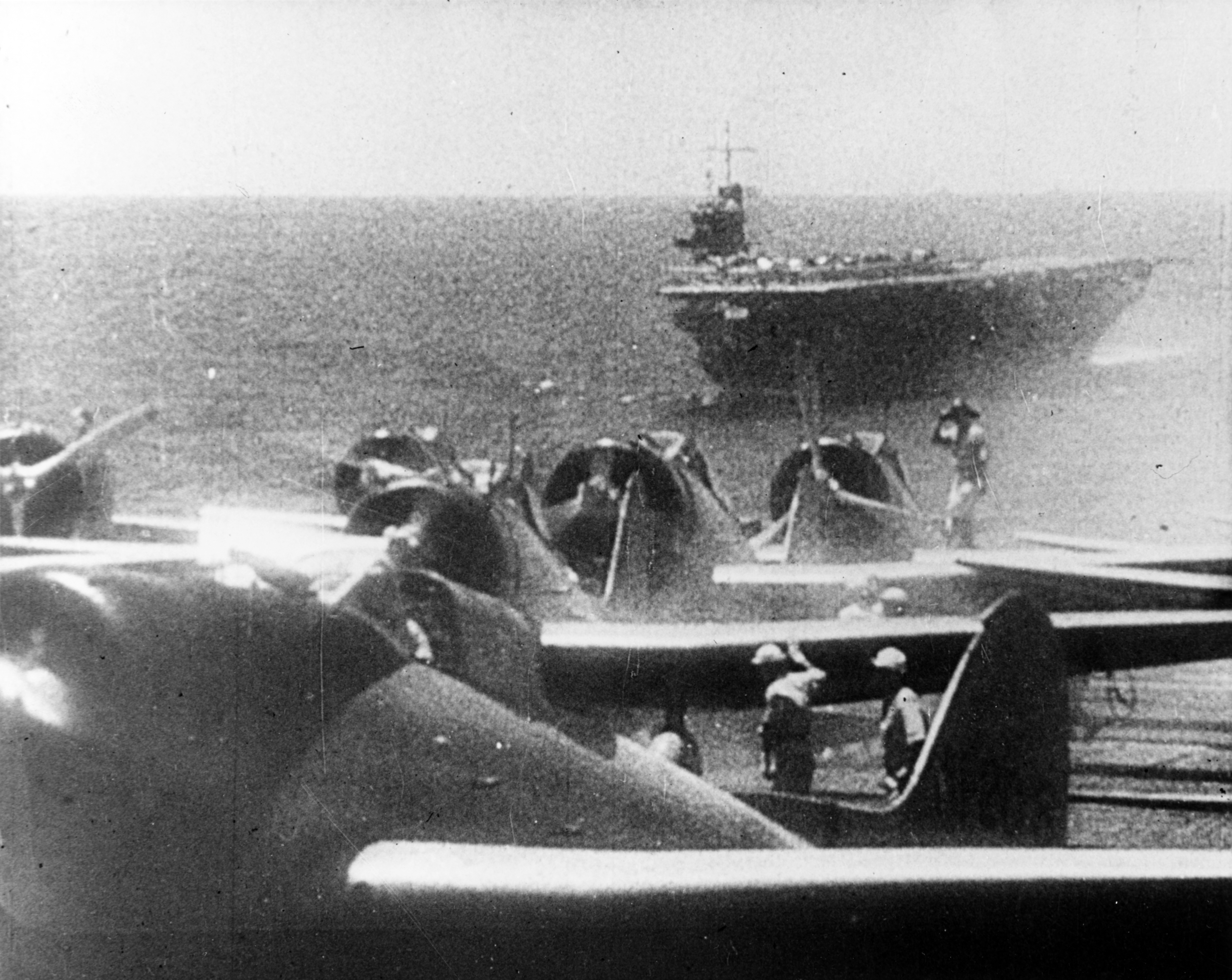
1st Air Fleet Aichi dive bombers preparing to bomb American naval base in Pearl Harbor, Hawaii

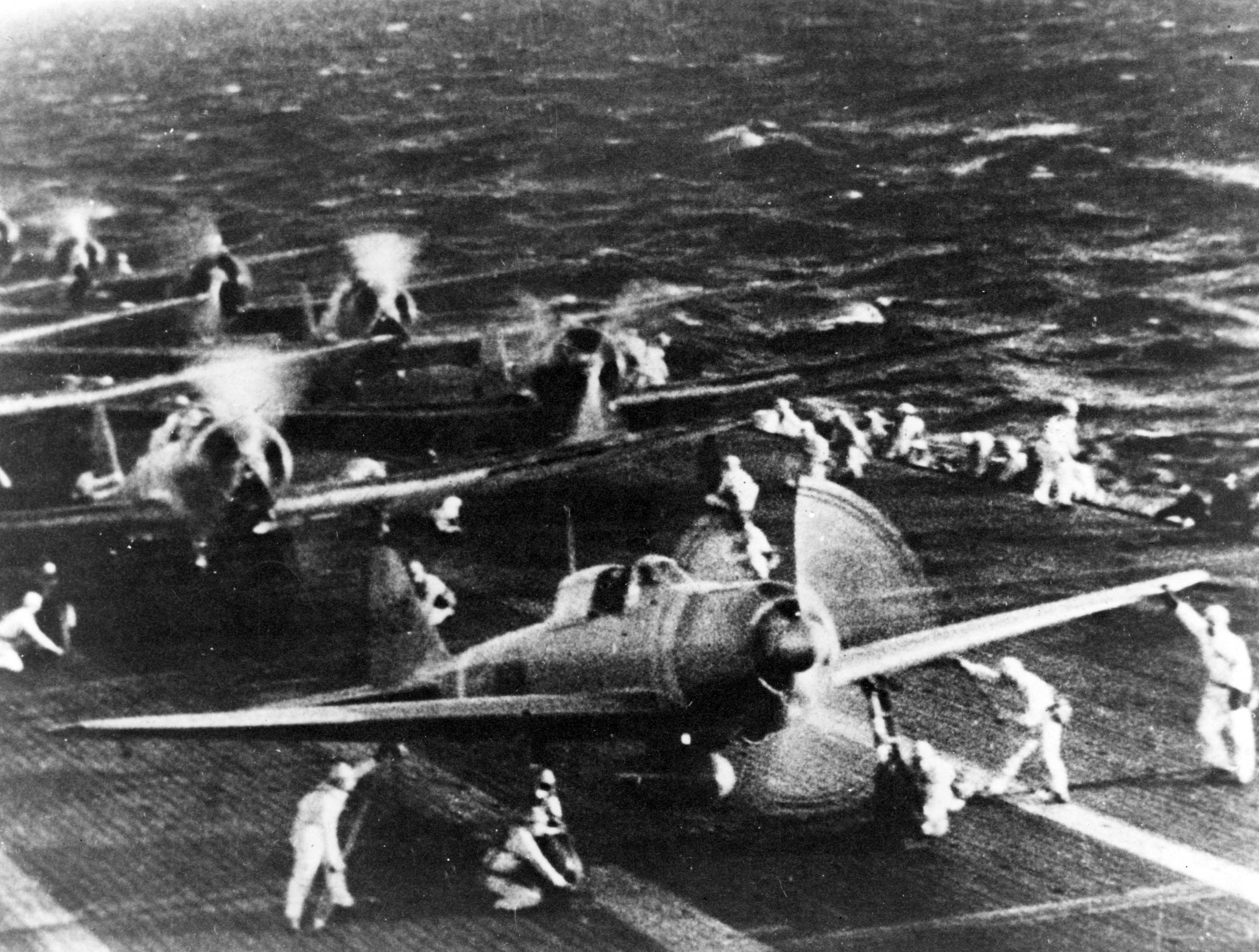
Carrier Shokaku preparing to launch the attack on Pearl Harbor.

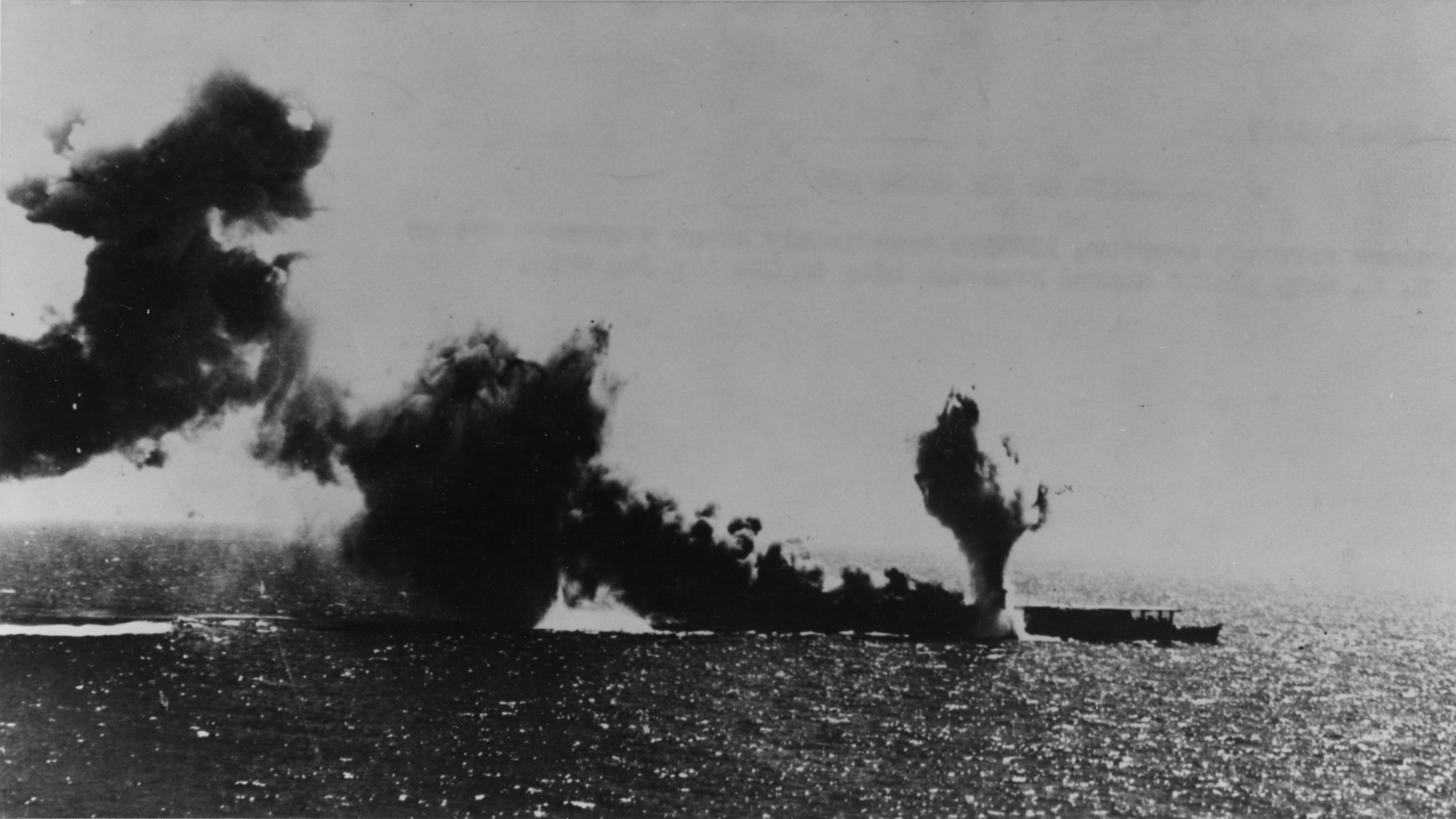
Japanese aircraft carrier Shōhō being hit by bombs and torpedoes at the Battle of the Coral Sea.

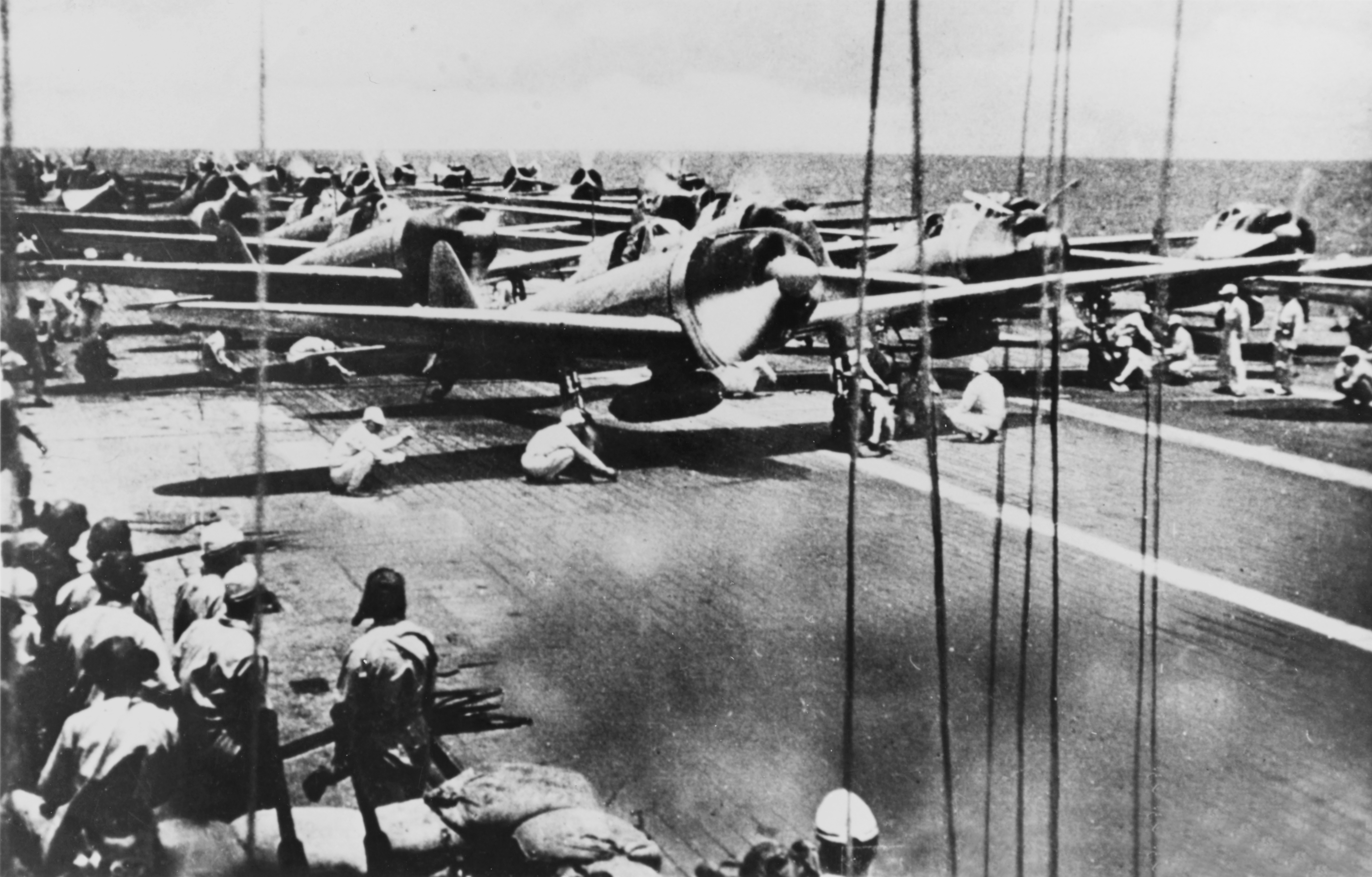
Japanese aircraft at the Battle of the Santa Cruz Islands.

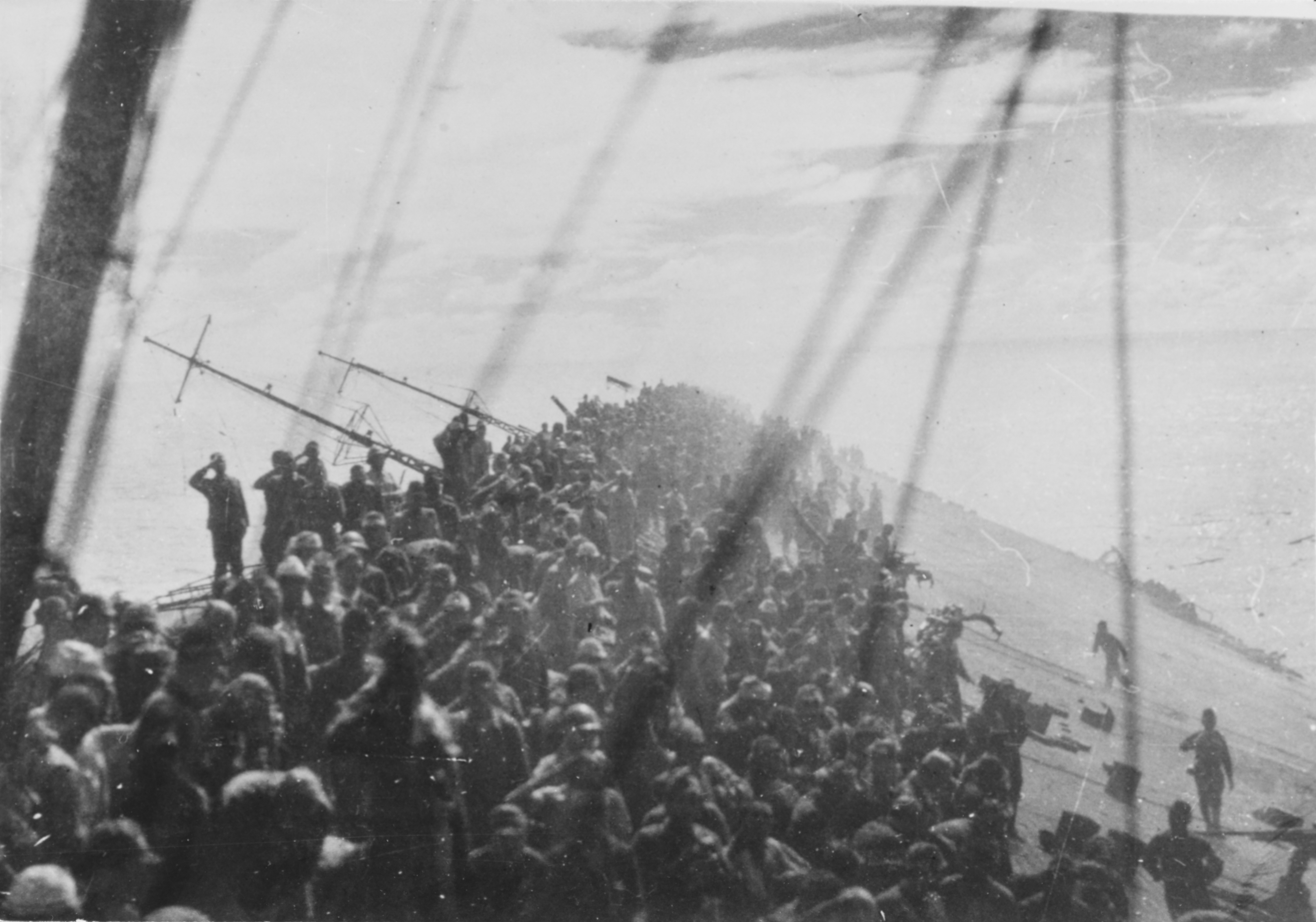
Zuikaku sinking after being hit at the Battle of Leyte Gulf.

=== Pearl Harbor ===
The Kidō Butai (also known as the Carrier Striking Task Force) set sail from Hitokappu Bay assembly point, Japan under Vice Admiral Chūichi Nagumo on 26 November 1941, arriving in Hawaiian waters on Sunday, 7 December 1941 Hawaiian time. The Japanese Ships and Submarines sent to Attack Pearl Harbor had originated mainly from military staging facilities in Kure, Japan (near Hiroshima) and Ariake Bay (near Nagasaki). At around 8am, the first wave began its attack on the US Pacific Fleet based at Pearl Harbor and on outlying airfields. By the end of the day, 21 American ships were either sunk or crippled, 188 aircraft were destroyed, and 2,403 Americans were killed. Japan was now formally at war with the United States.

For the attack on Pearl Harbor, this fleet had a strength of 103 level bombers, 128 dive bombers, 40 torpedo bombers, 88 fighter planes, plus 91 planes for a total of 441 planes.

=== Bombing of Darwin ===
The Bombing of Darwin on 19 February 1942 was the largest single attack ever mounted by a foreign power on Australia. On that day, 242 Japanese aircraft, in two separate raids, attacked the town, ships in Darwin's harbour and the town's two airfields in an attempt to prevent the Allies from using them as bases to contest the invasion of Timor and Java. The town was only lightly defended and the Japanese inflicted heavy losses upon the Allied forces at little cost to themselves. The urban areas of Darwin also suffered some damage from the raids and there were a number of civilian casualties.

=== Indian Ocean Raid ===
Between 31 March and 10 April 1942 the Japanese conducted a naval sortie against Allied naval forces in the Indian Ocean. The Fast Carrier Task Force (Kidō Butai), consisting of six carriers commanded by Admiral Chūichi Nagumo, inflicted heavy losses on the British fleet, with the sinking of 1 carrier, 2 cruisers, 2 destroyers, and 23 merchant ships for the loss of 20 aircraft. Attacks on the island of Ceylon were also carried out.

=== Battle of the Coral Sea ===
The 1st Air Fleet dispatched the Fifth Carrier Division in the Coral Sea during the return from the Indian Ocean. On May 7 the USN sighted the Port Moresby invasion force and mistook it for the main carrier force. Admiral Fletcher sent an aircraft strike which sank the IJN light carrier Shōhō. After this loss of air cover, the Port Moresby invasion force abandoned its mission and retreated north. On the same day the IJN sighted and sank USN destroyer Sims and oiler Neosho. The primary action took place on 8 May. Both carrier forces sighted and attacked each other. As a result, Lexington was sunk and Yorktown was damaged by a Japanese air strike. USN aircraft managed to damage Shōkaku, while Zuikaku was undamaged in the battle but sustained severe losses in aircraft and aircrew, so both Japanese carriers had to return to Japan for repair and replenishment and were unable to participate in the following operation. The remaining fleet returned to Japan to prepare for the Midway invasion (Operation MI).

=== Battle of Midway ===
Admiral Isoroku Yamamoto planned to lure and destroy USN carriers by attacking the Midway Islands in June 1942. The Japanese were unaware that the United States had broken their naval code. As a result of this, USN carriers were already in the area when the Japanese attacked Midway. On 3 June US land-based bombers from Midway attacked the Japanese fleet but scored no hits. On 4 June, due to the poor reconnaissance efforts and tactical mistakes of Vice Admiral Chūichi Nagumo, USN dive bombers were able to surprise the Japanese carrier force and destroyed three carriers (Akagi, Kaga and Sōryū). At the time of the attack the Japanese carriers were in the process of preparing to launch an air strike against the US carriers and their hangars were full of loaded aircraft, bombs and aviation fuel which decisively contributed to their destruction. Carrier Hiryū managed to survive the attack and Rear Admiral Tamon Yamaguchi launched a strike against Yorktown. Aircraft from Hiryū managed to cripple Yorktown, which was later sunk by Japanese submarine I-168. In response, the US launched a strike against Hiryū and sank her. That day the Japanese lost four aircraft carriers and much of their experienced aircrew.

=== Battle of the Philippine Sea ===
The US Navy's attack on the Japanese base at Truk (Chuuk) on 17 February 1944 (Operation Hailstone) surprised the Japanese military. In response, the Japanese Navy ordered all of the 61st Air Flotilla to the Mariana Islands. Its Number 261 Kaigun Kōkūtai (fighter) advanced to Saipan circa 19–24 February 1944, but attrition in air combats and illness weakened the unit greatly and it played only a minor role in the Battle of the Philippine Sea. Elements of No. 263 Kaigun Kōkūtai (fighter) of the 61st Air Flotilla were stationed on Guam from 15 June 1944 and participated in the battle.

=== Battle of Leyte Gulf ===
After disastrous losses at the Battle of the Philippine Sea, the Japanese carrier force was again practically without aircrew and aircraft. This meant that at the Battle of Leyte Gulf the IJN carrier force was only used as a decoy force where it was ultimately destroyed, the battle that saw the last Kidō Butai survivor, Zuikaku, along with Zuiho, Chiyoda and Chitose succumbing to US air attacks of Admiral William F. Halsey's Task Force 38.

== Bibliography ==
- Hata, Ikuhiko; Izawa, Yasuho and Shores, Christopher, (2011). Japanese Naval Air Force Fighter Units and Their Aces 1932–1945, Grub Street, ISBN 978-1-906502-84-3
- Parshall, Jonathan; Tully, Anthony (2005). Shattered Sword: The Untold Story of the Battle of Midway. Dulles, Virginia: Potomac Books. ISBN 1-57488-923-0.
- Prange, Gordon W. in collaboration with Goldstein, Donald M. and Dillon, Katherine V. (1981). At Dawn We Slept: The Untold Story of Pearl Harbor, Penguin Books, Ltd., ISBN 0-14-00-6455-9
- Thorpe, Donald W. (1977). Japanese Naval Air Force Camouflage and Markings World War II. Fallbrook, CA: Aero Publishers, 1977. ISBN 0-8168-6583-3 (hardcover; paperback ISBN 0-8168-6587-6).
- "Monthly the Maru" series, and "The Maru Special" series, "Ushio Shobō". Archived from the original on 6 June 2009. (Japan)
- "Monthly Ships of the World" series, "Kaijinsha". Archived from the original on 31 May 2009. (Japan)
- "Famous Airplanes of the World" series and "Monthly Kōku Fan" series, Bunrindō (Japan)
