= Japanese ship Ryūjō =

Two Japanese naval vessels have been named Ryūjō (龍驤, Prancing Dragon):

- Japanese ironclad Ryūjō, a cruiser of the Imperial Japanese Navy that fought in the Saga Rebellion, Taiwan Expedition and Satsuma Rebellion.
- Japanese aircraft carrier Ryūjō, an aircraft carrier of the Imperial Japanese Navy that fought in World War II.
