= Japanese destroyer Oboro (1930) =

Fubuki-class destroyer

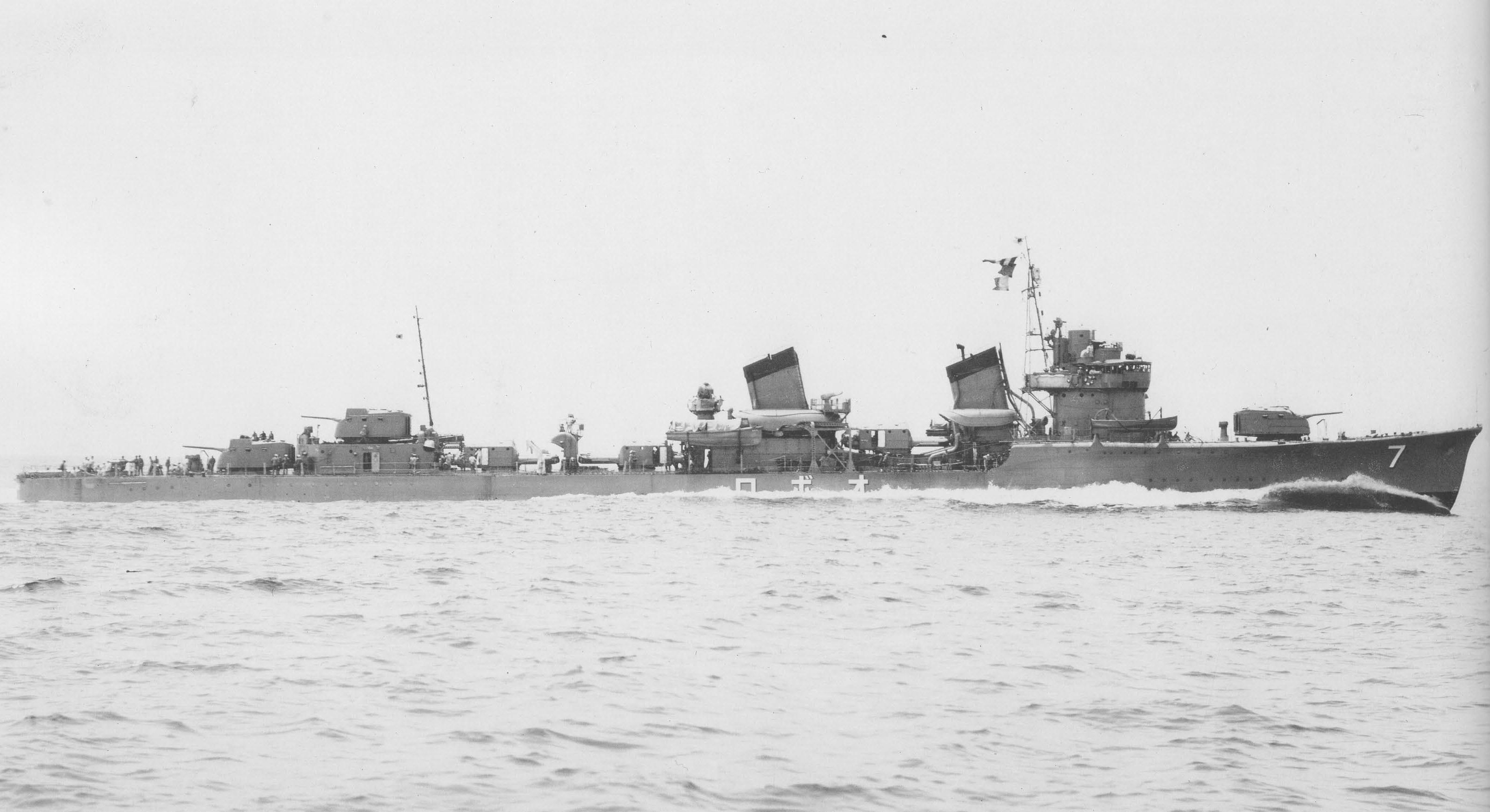
- Oboro on 22 July 1936

History

Empire of Japan
- Name: Oboro
- Namesake: Japanese destroyer Oboro (1899)
- Ordered: 1923 Fiscal Year
- Builder: Sasebo Naval Arsenal
- Yard number: Destroyer No. 51
- Laid down: 29 November 1929
- Launched: 8 November 1930
- Commissioned: 31 October 1931
- Stricken: 15 November 1942
- Fate: Sunk in air attack, 17 October 1942

General characteristics
- Class & type: Fubuki-class destroyer
- Displacement: 1,750 long tons (1,780 t) standard; 2,050 long tons (2,080 t) re-built
- Length: 111.96 m (367.3 ft) pp; 115.3 m (378 ft) waterline; 118.41 m (388.5 ft) overall
- Beam: 10.4 m (34 ft 1 in)
- Draft: 3.2 m (10 ft 6 in)
- Propulsion: 4 × Kampon type boilers; 2 × Kampon Type Ro geared turbines; 2 × shafts at 50,000 ihp (37,000 kW)
- Speed: 38 knots (44 mph; 70 km/h)
- Range: 5,000 nmi (9,300 km) at 14 knots (26 km/h)
- Complement: 219
- Armament: 6 × Type 3 127 mm 50 caliber naval guns (3×2); up to 22 × Type 96 25 mm AT/AA Guns; up to 10 × 13 mm AA guns; 9 × 610 mm (24 in) torpedo tubes; 36 × depth charges

Service record
- Operations: Second Sino-Japanese War; Invasion of French Indochina; Invasion of Guam; Aleutian campaign

Oboro (朧, "Moonlight") was the seventeenth of twenty-four Fubuki-class destroyers, built for the Imperial Japanese Navy following World War I.

== History ==
Construction of the advanced Fubuki-class destroyers was authorized as part of the Imperial Japanese Navy's expansion program from fiscal 1923, intended to give Japan a qualitative edge with the world's most modern ships. The Fubuki class had performance that was a quantum leap over previous destroyer designs, so much so that they were designated Special Type destroyers (特型, Tokugata). The large size, powerful engines, high speed, large radius of action and unprecedented armament gave these destroyers the firepower similar to many light cruisers in other navies. Oboro, built at the Sasebo Naval Arsenal, was the seventh in an improved series, which incorporated a modified gun turret that could elevate her main battery of Type 3 127 mm 50 caliber naval guns to 75° as opposed to the original 40°, thus permitting the guns to be used as dual purpose guns against aircraft. Oboro was laid down on 29 November 1930, launched on 8 November 1930 and commissioned on 31 October 1931. Originally assigned hull designation “Destroyer No. 51”, she was commissioned as Oboro.

The 4th Fleet Incident occurred only a year after her commissioning, and Oboro was quickly taken back to the shipyards to have her hull strengthened.

== Operational history ==
On completion, Oboro was assigned to Destroyer Division 20 under the IJN 2nd Fleet. During the Second Sino-Japanese War, from 1937, Oboro covered landing of Japanese forces in Shanghai and Hangzhou. From 1940, she was assigned to patrol and cover landings of Japanese forces in south China and in the Invasion of French Indochina.

=== World War II history ===
At the time of the attack on Pearl Harbor, Oboro was assigned to Carrier Division 5 of the IJN 1st Air Fleet, and had deployed from Yokosuka Naval District to Hahajima in the Bonin Islands, from which it subsequently provided cover for Japanese landing operations in the Invasion of Guam.

From mid-December to April 1942, Oboro was based at Kwajalein, and from mid-April to the end of August 1942, Oboro was based at Yokosuka, patrolling in the nearby waters, and escorting convoys from Yokosuka to Ōminato Guard District to the north, and Mako Guard District to the southwest.

On 11 October 1942, Oboro departed Yokosuka with a re-supply convoy for Kiska in the Japanese-occupied Aleutian Islands. Oboro was sunk on 17 October in an air attack by USAAF Martin B-26 Marauders 30 nautical miles (56 km) northeast of Kiska at position 52°17′N 178°08′E. A direct bomb hit among munitions being carried caused the ship to explode and sink, leaving only 17 survivors, including her captain (LtCdr Hiro Yamana), who were rescued by the destroyer Hatsuharu (also heavily damaged in the same attack).

On 15 November 1942, Oboro was removed from the navy list.
