= Japanese destroyer Akigumo (1941) =

Kagerō-class destroyer

Coordinates: 06°43′N 122°23′E

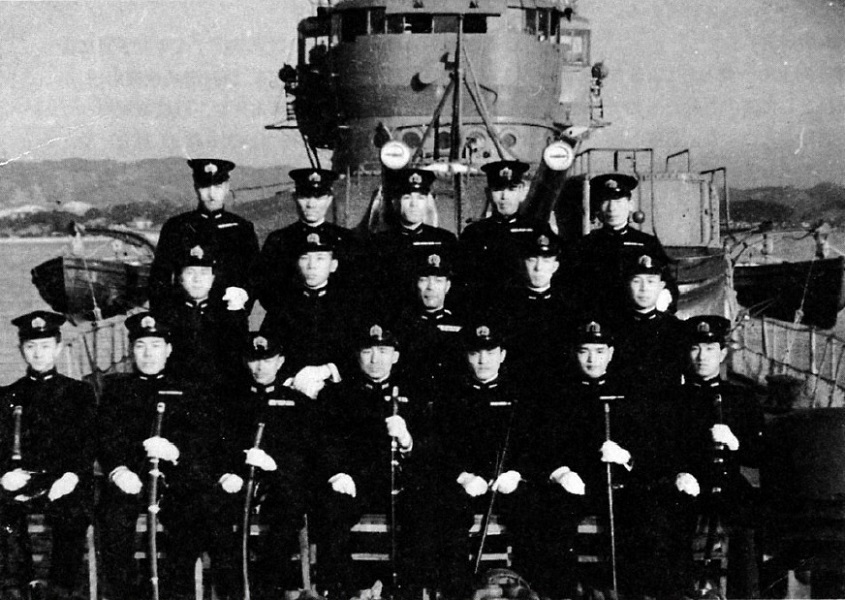
- Rear Admiral Takama Tamotsu and his staff aboard Akigumo, 19 January 1944

History

Empire of Japan
- Name: Akigumo
- Ordered: 4 March 1939
- Builder: Uraga Dock Company
- Laid down: 2 July 1940
- Launched: 11 April 1941
- Commissioned: 27 September 1941
- Stricken: 10 June 1944
- Fate: Torpedoed and sunk, 11 April 1944

General characteristics
- Class & type: Kagerō-class destroyer
- Displacement: 2,490 long tons (2,530 t)
- Length: 118.5 m (388 ft 9 in)
- Beam: 10.8 m (35 ft 5 in)
- Draft: 3.8 m (12 ft 6 in)
- Speed: 35 knots (65 km/h; 40 mph)
- Complement: 240
- Armament: 6 × 12.7 cm (5 in) guns; 2 × twin 25 mm (1 in) AA guns; up to 4 × 13.2 mm (0.52 in) AA guns; 8 × 61 cm (24 in) torpedo tubes; 36 depth charges; (1944); 4 × 12.7 cm (5 in) guns; Up to 28 25 mm (1 in) AA guns

Akigumo (秋雲; "Autumn Clouds") was one of 19 Kagerō-class destroyers built for the Imperial Japanese Navy during the 1930s.

== Design and description ==
The Kagerō class was an enlarged and improved version of the preceding Asashio class. Their crew numbered 240 officers and enlisted men. The ships measured 118.5 meters (388 ft 9 in) overall, with a beam of 10.8 meters (35 ft 5 in) and a draft of 3.76 meters (12 ft 4 in). They displaced 2,065 metric tons (2,032 long tons) at standard load and 2,529 metric tons (2,489 long tons) at deep load. The ships had two Kampon geared steam turbines, each driving one propeller shaft, using steam provided by three Kampon water-tube boilers. The turbines were rated at a total of 52,000 shaft horsepower (39,000 kW) for a designed speed of 35 knots (65 km/h; 40 mph). The ships had a range of 5,000 nautical miles (9,300 km; 5,800 mi) at a speed of 18 knots (33 km/h; 21 mph).

The main armament of the Kagerō class consisted of six 12.7-centimeter (5 in) Type 3 guns in three twin-gun turrets, one superfiring pair aft and one turret forward of the superstructure. They were built with four 25-millimeter (1 in) Type 96 anti-aircraft (AA) guns in two twin-gun mounts, but more of these guns were added over the course of the war. The ships were also armed with eight 61-centimeter (24 in) torpedo tubes for the oxygen-fueled Type 93 "Long Lance" torpedo in two quadruple traversing mounts; one reload was carried for each tube. Their anti-submarine weapons comprised 16 depth charges.

=== Kagerō or Yūgumo-class destroyer ===
For several decades after the end of World War II, Akigumo was falsely believed to be a Yūgumo-class destroyer due to the testimony of Imperial Japanese Navy photographer Shizuo Fukui, which was repeated by several books and naval historians. This myth was further perpetrated by the lack of any existing photos of the ship for the time being, that she was assigned to destroyer division 10, which was otherwise all Yūgumo-class destroyers (Yūgumo, Makigumo, Kazagumo), and she had the same suffix as the first few Yūgumos.

However, the question remained of why Akigumo's 'X' turret was removed and replaced with AA guns, as where all Yūgumo-class destroyers kept their 'X' turrets due to their increased elevation. The removal provided evidence that Akigumo was a Kagerō-class destroyer, as listed in official Imperial Japanese Navy archives and records. A pivotal point was reached in 1994 when a survey by maritime historian Tamura Toshio confirmed Akgumo was of the Kagerō class, and additionally the discovery of the only known photo of Akigumo, taken on 19 January 1944 of Rear Admiral Takama Tamotsu and his destroyer squadron 11 staff posing on Akigumo's bow, showing her forward turret and bridge behind them; the shape of Akigumo's bridge was demonstrably of the Kagerō class and not of the Yūgumo class. As for the suffix, the destroyer was initially to be named Shimakaze, before this name was reassigned to Japan's "super destroyer" Shimakaze. The Japanese command was out of names with the suffix "kaze" and thus chose the name Akigumo.

== Career ==
Akigumo was completed on 27 September 1941, the last of the 19 Kagerō-class destroyers built, and the second to last destroyer built before the start of World War II for Japan. She was uniquely not appointed to a destroyer division, and was instead assigned solely as an escort for aircraft carrier division 5 (Shōkaku and Zuikaku) under the leadership of Commander Arimoto Terumichi. Shortly afterwards on 18 November, Akigumo departed for Sakei Bay, and eight days later departed Japan escorting the Kido Butai air fleet. On 7 December 1941, the Japanese aircraft carriers attacked Pearl Harbor, sparking the Pacific War.

After refueling, Akigumo returned to Japan on 22 December, and while docked in Kure Commander Soma Masahira was reappointed to Akigumo. She then traveled to Truk, and throughout January escorted the aircraft carriers during raids on New Guinea and the Philippines, then engaged in patrol duty off Japanese waters. Throughout the beginning of April, she escorted aircraft carriers throughout the Indian Ocean raid, and upon returning to Japan, the lone Akigumo was finally assigned to destroyer division 10 (Kazagumo, Makigumo, Yūgumo, and Akigumo). Her first operation as part of a division came when escorting the failed attempts to counteract the Doolittle Raid, before being docked for refit. From 4-5 June, Akigumo escorted aircraft carriers during the disastrous Battle of Midway; witnessing the sinking of four Japanese aircraft carriers to American aircraft carrier raids. After a series of patrol and training duties, Akigumo escorted aircraft carriers at the Battle of the Eastern Solomons on 24 August, before taking part in troop transport missions to Guadalcanal for the entirety of September and October.

On 24 October 1942, Akigumo escorted aircraft carriers during the Battle of Santa Cruz, where she was attacked by a flight of nine American dive bombers operating from the aircraft carriers USS Enterprise and USS Hornet, but received no damage as the attacks were mostly focused on the aircraft carriers; several ships were damaged but no sinking were scored. In turn, Japanese planes sank a destroyer, damaged several other ships, and fatally damaged Hornet with at least five bomb and three torpedo hits, leading to the US abandoning the carrier and attempting to scuttle her. However, the torpedoes fired at the ship either missed or failed to arm, and before further scuttling attempts could be made, the approach of the Japanese surface fleet quickly warded off the escorting American destroyers. Akigumo's crew witnessed a glowing reddish tinge in the distance; this was Hornet still on fire from the air attacks. Closing to point blank range, so close Akigumo's crew noted the tow cables used in a vain attempt to save the ship, the fleet command ordered Hornet to be captured, prompting Akigumo and Makigumo to tow the hulked carrier, but the heavy flooding and fires made this task impossible. Instead, if the US could not scuttle Hornet, the Japanese would finish the favor. Akigumo pumped 24 5-inch (127 mm) rounds into the carrier, but this had no noticeable effect. After an idea of scuttling Hornet with depth charges was discharged, Akigumo and Makigumo swerved into firing range and each unleashed two torpedoes at their target. Three noticeably struck their target as Akigumo left the scene and watched Hornet sink, shining her searchlight as her signalman sketched the final moments of Hornet.

After the battle, Akigumo escorted the damaged light carrier Zuihō and heavy cruiser Kumano to repairs. From 1-7 February 1943, Akigumo assisted in the evacuation of Guadalcanal, rescuing starving troops and transporting them to the Russell Islands. March saw Akigumo undertake convoy escorting duty, then back to troop transport runs in April before being drydocked in Japan for repairs and refit from May to June. July and August saw a return to troop transport runs before on 8 September Akigumo was promoted to Rear Admiral Ijuin Matsuji's flagship of destroyer squadron 3. After leading two troop transport runs to Kolombangara, Akigumo served as Ijuin's flagship during the Battle of Vella Lavella on 7 October, the last Japanese naval victory of the war. However, Akigumo was far off from the initial engagement and failed to take part against the initial action which won the victory, only managing to join the destroyers Kazagumo and Isokaze in a torpedo attack on the American destroyers near the battle's end which failed to land a single blow before regrouping with the troop convoy. She spent the rest of October on patrol duty off Truk before returning to Japan, where Commander Iritono Atsuo was appointed command of the destroyer.

Akigumo returned to service on 23 November when escorting a tanker convoy operating off the Marshall Islands. Two days later, Toa Maru was torpedoed and sunk by the submarine USS Searaven, prompting Akigumo to drop 27 depth charges; Searaven survived and withdrew while Akigumo rescued 117 survivors from Toa Maru. Returning to Japan on 12 December, Akigumo was docked for refit, where her 'X' turret was removed and replaced with single purpose AA guns, and she mounted both the active Type 22 and the passive Type E-27 radars. After leaving drydock, on 19 January 1944, Akigumo's command staff posed for a photograph taken on the ship's bow, producing the only known image of the ship. Throughout February and March, Akigumo escorted aircraft carriers to several occupied Islands then back to Japan, then operated off the Lingga Roads. From 1-4 April, she transported materials for the 601-airgroup to Davao, being attacked by aircraft underway.

On 9 April 1944, Akigumo departed for Singapore. However, two days later while underway and scouting ahead of the transport ship Kiyokawa Maru, she was detected by the submarine USS Redfin, which rendered a firing solution and unleashed four torpedoes. By the time Akigumo noticed the enemy, it was too late. Two torpedoes made their mark as Commander Atsuo ordered the abandon ship issue immediately afterwards, before retreating to his cabin to share the ship's fate. Within a few minutes Akigumo capsized and sank with the loss of 140 men. Her sinking was witnessed by a local fishing boat, allowing for 113 sailors to be rescued by an I boat.
