= Japanese aircraft carrier Shōkaku =

Shōkaku-class aircraft carrier

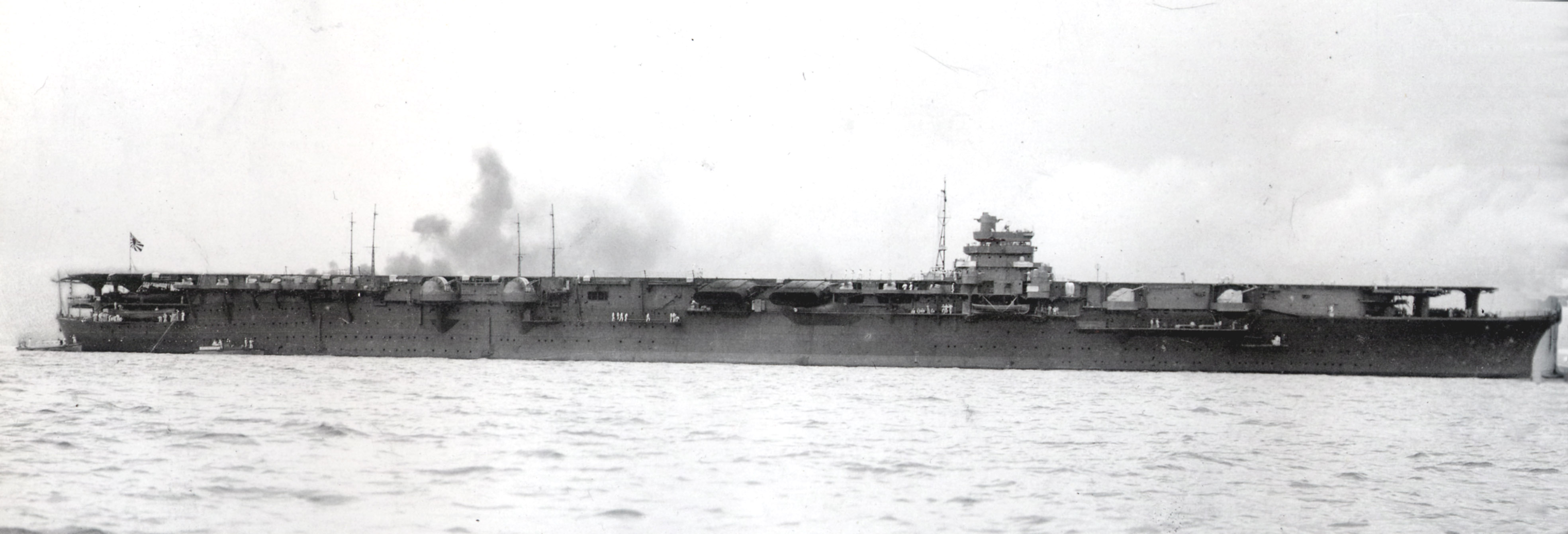
- Shōkaku upon completion, 23 August 1941

History

Empire of Japan
- Name: Shōkaku
- Namesake: 翔鶴, "Soaring Crane"
- Builder: Yokosuka Naval Arsenal
- Laid down: 12 December 1937
- Launched: 1 June 1939
- Commissioned: 8 August 1941
- Fate: Torpedoed and sunk, 19 June 1944

General characteristics (as built)
- Class & type: Shōkaku-class aircraft carrier
- Displacement: 25,675 long tons (26,087 t) (standard); 32,105 long tons (32,620 t) (full load)
- Length: 257.5 m (844 ft 10 in)
- Beam: 26 m (85 ft 4 in)
- Draft: 8.8 m (28 ft 10 in)
- Installed power: 8 × water-tube boilers; 160,000 shp (120,000 kW)
- Propulsion: 4 × shafts; 4 × geared steam turbines
- Speed: 34.2 kn (63.3 km/h; 39.4 mph)
- Range: 9,700 nmi (18,000 km; 11,200 mi) at 18 knots (33 km/h; 21 mph)
- Complement: 1,660
- Armament: 8 × twin 12.7 cm (5 in) DP guns; 12 × triple 25 mm (1 in) AA guns
- Armor: Waterline belt: 46–165 mm (1.8–6.5 in); Deck: 65–132 mm (2.6–5.2 in)
- Aircraft carried: 72 (+12 spares); 7 December 1941: 18 × Mitsubishi A6M2 "Zero" fighters; 27 × Aichi D3A1 "Val" dive bombers; 27 × Nakajima B5N1/2 "Kate" torpedo bombers

Shōkaku (Japanese: 翔鶴; meaning "Soaring Crane") was the lead ship of her class of two aircraft carriers built for the Imperial Japanese Navy (IJN) shortly before the Pacific War. Along with her sistership Zuikaku, she took part in several key naval battles during the war, starting the attack on Pearl Harbor where she destroyed air fields and other land facilities. During the Indian Ocean Raid, April 1942, Shōkaku dive bombers sank the armed merchant cruiser HMS Hector and helped to sink the light carrier HMS Hermes and the steamship SS Sagaing. At the battle of the Coral Sea later that May - assisted by Zuikaku - Shōkaku aircraft scored primary credit for sinking the aircraft carrier USS Lexington. Shōkaku dive bombers also sank the destroyer USS Sims and helped to sink the fleet oilier USS Neosho. However, she was in turn crippled by bomb hits and taken out of action.

In August, Shōkaku saw action again at the battle of the Eastern Solomons where she helped to cripple the aircraft carrier USS Enterprise but failed to score an overall victory. This was made up for later that October at the Battle of the Santa Cruz Islands where Shōkaku aircraft helped to sink the aircraft carrier USS Hornet and badly damaged the Enterprise; taking several bomb hits but remaining combat capable. However, throughout 1943 Shōkaku was mainly reserved for the Kantai Kessen plan and primarily transited between naval ports and rendezvoused in failed attempts to enact a large scale battleline engagement. Shōkaku finally saw action again at the battle of the Philippine Sea, 19 June 1944, where she damaged the battleship USS South Dakota but was finally torpedoed and sunk by the submarine USS Cavalla.

== Design ==
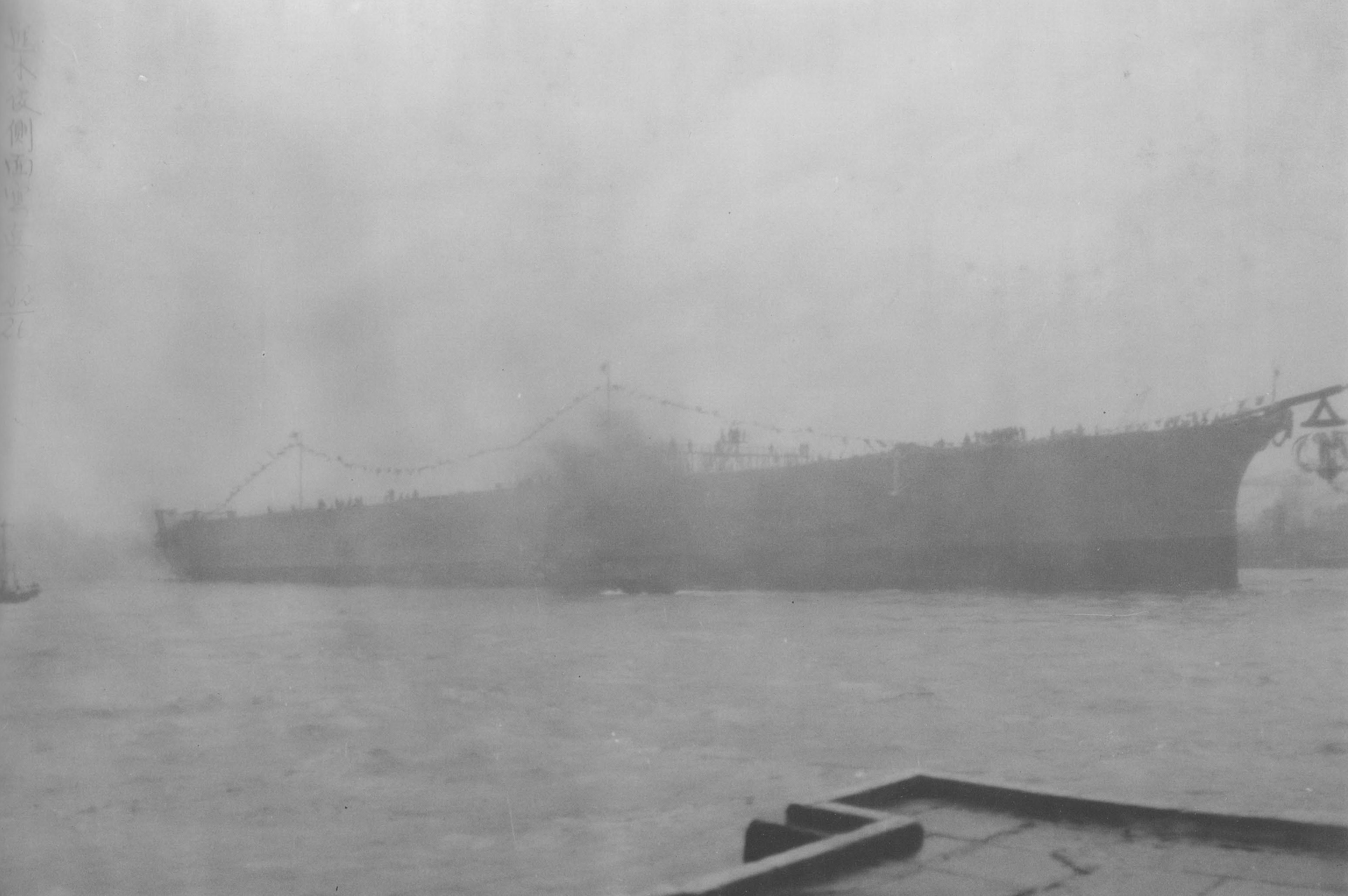
Shōkaku being launched in heavy rain at Yokosuka, 1 June 1939.

The Shōkaku-class carriers were part of the same program that also included the Yamato-class battleships. No longer restricted by the provisions of the Washington Naval Treaty, which expired in December 1936, the Imperial Japanese Navy (IJN) was free to incorporate all those features they deemed most desirable in an aircraft carrier, namely high speed, a long radius of action, heavy protection and a large aircraft capacity. Shōkaku was laid down at Yokosuka Dockyard on 12 December 1937, launched on 1 June 1939, and commissioned on 8 August 1941.

With an efficient modern design, a displacement of about 32,000 long tons (32,514 t), and a top speed of 34 kn (63 km/h; 39 mph), Shōkaku could carry 70–80 aircraft. Her enhanced protection compared favorably to that of contemporary Allied aircraft carriers and enabled Shōkaku to survive serious damage during the battles of the Coral Sea and Santa Cruz.

=== Hull ===
In appearance, Shōkaku resembled an enlarged Hiryū, though with a 35.3 m (116 ft) longer overall length, 4.6 m (15 ft) wider beam and a larger island. As in Hiryū, the forecastle was raised to the level of the upper hangar deck to improve seakeeping. She also had a wider, more rounded and heavily flared bow which kept the flight deck dry in most sea conditions.

The carrier's forefoot was of the newly developed bulbous type, sometimes referred to informally as a Taylor pear, which served to reduce the hull's underwater drag within a given range of speeds, improving both the ship's speed and endurance. Unlike the larger bulbous forefeet fitted to the battleships Yamato and Musashi, however, Shōkaku's did not protrude beyond the ship's stem.

Shōkaku was 10,000 tons heavier than Sōryū, mainly due to the extra armor incorporated into the ship's design. Vertical protection consisted of 215 mm (8.5 in) on the main armor deck over the machinery, magazines and aviation fuel tanks, while horizontal protection consisted of 215 mm (8.5 in) along the waterline belt abreast the machinery spaces, reducing to 150 mm (5.9 in) outboard of the magazines.

Shōkaku normally stowed 150,000 gallons of avgas for operational use. Unlike British carriers, whose aviation fuel was stored in separate cylinders or coffer-dams surrounded by seawater, all pre-war Japanese carriers had their aviation fuel tanks built integral with the ship's hull, and Shōkaku was no exception. The dangers this posed, however, did not become evident until wartime experience demonstrated these were often prone to cracking and leaking as the shocks and stresses of hits or near-misses to the carrier's hull were inevitably transferred to and absorbed by the fuel tanks. Following the debacle at Midway in mid-1942, the empty air spaces around Shōkaku's aviation fuel tanks, normally pumped full of inert carbon dioxide, were instead filled with concrete in an attempt to protect them from possible damage. But this did little to prevent volatile fumes spreading to the hangar decks in the event damage did occur, particularly demonstrated when Cavalla torpedoed and sank her.

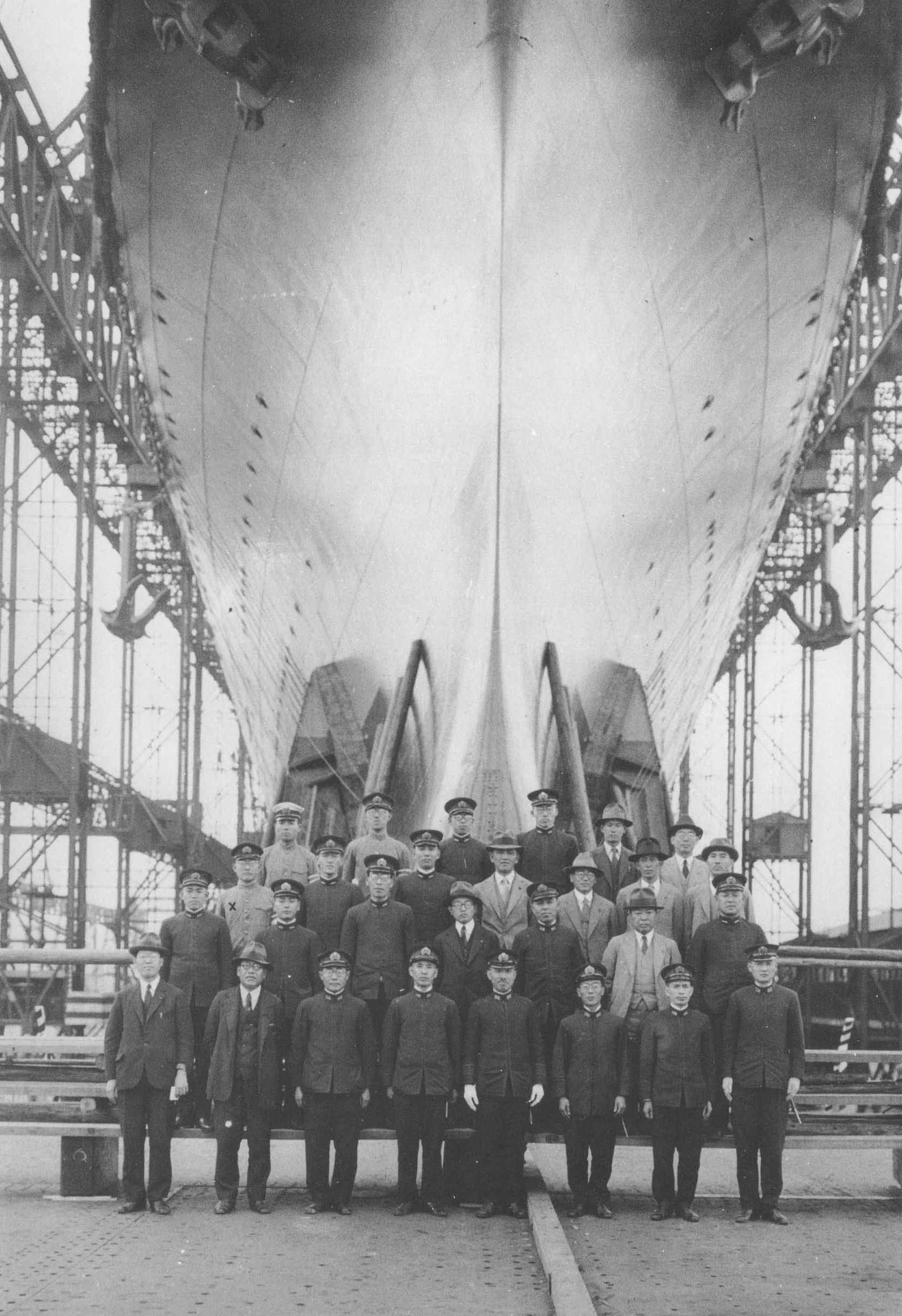
The twenty-eight chief shipbuilders of Shōkaku pose at the ship's prow prior to launching (30 May 1939).

=== Machinery ===
The geared turbines installed on Shōkaku were essentially the same as those on Sōryū, maximum power increasing by 8,000 shp (6,000 kW) to 160,000 shp (120,000 kW). In spite of all the additional armor, greater displacement and a 2.1 m (6.9 ft) increase in draught, Shōkaku was able to attain a speed of just over 34.2 kn (63.3 km/h; 39.4 mph) during trials. Maximum fuel bunkerage was 4100 tons, giving her a radius of action of 9,700 nmi (18,000 km; 11,200 mi) at 18 kn (33 km/h; 21 mph). Two same-sized downward-curving funnels on the ship's starboard side, just abaft the island, vented exhaust gases horizontally from the boilers and were sufficiently angled to keep the flight deck free of smoke in most wind conditions.

=== Flight deck and hangars ===
Shōkaku's 242 m (794 ft) long wood-planked flight deck ended short of the ship's bow and, just barely, short of the stern. It was supported by four steel pillars forward of the hangar box and by two pillars aft.

The flight deck and both hangars (upper and lower) were serviced by three elevators, the largest being the forward one at 13 m (43 ft) by 16 m (52 ft), the middle and the rear elevators measured 13 m (43 ft) by 12 m (39 ft). All three were capable of transferring aircraft weighing up to 5,000 kg (11,000 lb) and raising or lowering them took approximately 15–20 seconds.

Shōkaku's nine Type 4 electrically operated arrester wires followed the same standard arrangement as that on Hiryū, three forward and six aft. They were capable of stopping a 6,000 kg (13,000 lb) aircraft at speeds of 60–78 knots (111–144 km/h; 69–90 mph). A third crash barrier was added and a light collapsible wind-break screen was installed just forward of the island.

The upper hangar was 623.4 by 65.6 feet (190 by 20 m) and had an approximate height of 15.7 feet (4.8 m); the lower was 524.9 by 65.6 feet (160 by 20 m) and had an approximate height of 15.7 feet (4.8 m). Together they had an approximate total area of 75,347 square feet (7,000 m^{2}). Hangar space was not greatly increased in comparison to Sōryū and both Shōkaku and Zuikaku could each carry just nine more aircraft than Sōryū, giving them a normal operating capacity of seventy-two plus room for twelve in reserve. Unlike on Sōryū, the reserve aircraft did not need to be kept in a state of disassembly, however, thereby shortening the time required to make them operational.

After experimenting with port-side islands on two previous carriers, Akagi and Hiryū, the IJN opted to build both Shōkaku and her sister ship Zuikaku with starboard-side islands.

In September 1942, a Type 21 air-warning radar was installed on Shōkaku's island atop the central fire control director, the first such device to be fitted on any Japanese carrier. The Type 21 had a "mattress" antenna and the initial prototypes were light enough that no major structural modifications were necessary. Later versions, however, were bulkier and required eventual removal of the fifth fire control director in order to accommodate the larger and heavier antenna.

=== Armament ===
Shōkaku's primary air defense consisted of sixteen 127 mm (5.0 in) Type 89 dual-purpose AA guns in twin mountings. These were sited below flight deck level on projecting sponsons with four such paired batteries on either side of the ship's hull, two forward and two aft. Four fire control directors were installed, two on the port side and two to starboard. A fifth fire control director was located atop the carrier's island and could control any or all of the heavy-caliber guns as needed.

Initially, light AA defense was provided by twelve triple-mount 25 mm (0.98 in) Type 96 AA guns.

In June 1942, Shōkaku had her anti-aircraft armament augmented with six triple 25 mm mounts, two each at the bow and stern, and one each fore and aft of the island. The bow and stern groups each received a Type 95 director. In October another triple 25 mm mount was added at the bow and stern and 10 single mounts were added before the Battle of the Philippine Sea in June 1944.

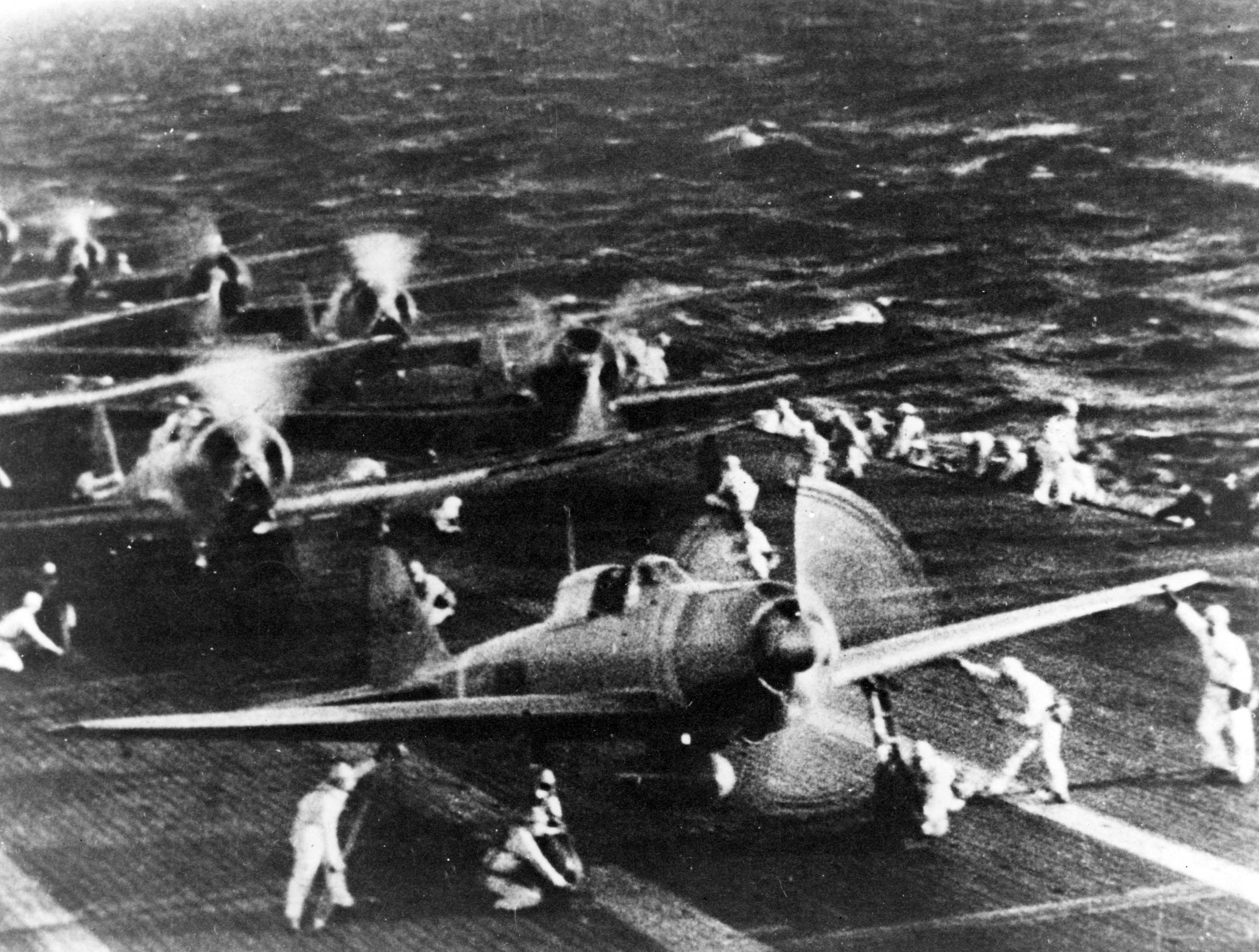
Shōkaku preparing to launch D3A "Val" dive bombers during the attack on Pearl Harbor, 7 December 1941

== Operational history ==
Shōkaku and Zuikaku formed the Japanese 5th Carrier Division, embarking their aircraft shortly before the Pearl Harbor attack. Each carrier's aircraft complement consisted of 18 Mitsubishi A6M2 "Zero" fighters, 27 Aichi D3A1 "Val" dive bombers, and 27 Nakajima B5N1 or B5N2 "Kate" torpedo bombers.

Shōkaku and Zuikaku joined the Kido Butai ("Mobile Unit/Force", the Combined Fleet's main carrier battle group) and participated in Japan's early wartime naval offensives, including Pearl Harbor and the attack on Rabaul in January 1942.

=== Indian Ocean Raid ===
Main Article: Indian Ocean Raid

On 17 March, Shōkaku and Zuikaku left Yokosuka and arrived at Staring Bay on the 24th where they met with Akagi, Sōryū, and Hiryū, and an escort of the battleships Kongō, Hiei, Kirishima, and Haruna, the heavy cruisers Tone and Chikuma, the light cruiser Abukuma, and 11 destroyers in preparation for Operation C; a planned carrier raid to destroy British shipping in the Indian Ocean. The force departed Starting Bay on 3 April. The next day, they were spotted by a Catalina flying boat which was shot down by anti-aircraft fire from the destroyer Kagerō and six fighters, but not before radioing the presence of Japanese ships to Air Vice-Marshall D'Albiac whom ordered local British warships to sail out of harbor in expectation of an attack.

At 7:30 the next morning, Shōkaku lent 19 D3A "Val" dive bombers to a mass wave of attack aircraft to strike the port of Colombo, joining another 19 Vals from Zuikaku and 53 B5N "Kate" torpedo bombers from Sōryū, Hiryū and Akagi. The planes attacked at 7:40, and Shōkaku's air group singled out the 11,200-ton armed merchant cruiser HMS Hector. Hector was hit by five bombs that set her ablaze, and after uncontrollable fires ravaged Hector, she was abandoned and lef to sink over the course of several hours, earning Shōkaku her first kill. Her remaining aircraft then damaged the submarine depot ship HMS Lucia, while other carrier groups destroyed land position and sank the destroyer HMS Tenedos and the 6,838-ton Norwegian tanker Soli. Later in the afternoon, 53 dive bombers from Akagi, Sōryū, and Hiryu sank the heavy cruisers HMS Cornwall and HMS Dorsetshire.

On the 9th, Shōkaku joined the other carriers in raiding the port of Trincomalee. Dive bombers from Shōkaku and Zuikaku attacked the 8,000-ton British steamship Sagaing and gouged her with a pair of bomb hits that detonated ammunition stored throughout the ship, killing 5 sailors. They left Sagaing to burn out and drift into the Malay Cove where she was blasted apart by a massive explosion 15 minutes later. Shōkaku and Zuikaku also damaged the monitor HMS Erebus with 6 bomb near misses and killed at least 9 of her crew. Shōkaku only lost one Zero fighter during the attack.

==== Sinking of HMS Hermes ====
More notably, at 9:00 a floatplane launched from the Haruna managed to locate the light carrier HMS Hermes and the destroyer HMAS Vampire operating 75 miles (120 km) off Trincomalee. In response, Shōkaku launched 18 Val dive bombers which were joined by another 14 from Zuikaku and their combined air group located the enemy ships after 10:30. Their 32 combined dive bombers pulverized Hermes into a floating wreck. Just about every bomb launched hit and punched straight through the flight deck before exploding deep inside the ship. Fires subsequently reached the magazine and lifted the light carrier out of the water with a massive explosion, before a bomb directly smashed into the bridge and killed Hermes's entire command staff. Disabled and set ablaze, Hermes sank 15 minutes later with the loss of 307 men, earning Shōkaku partial credit for sinking the first aircraft carrier sunk to another aircraft carrier in history. Afterwards, dive bombers from Akagi attacked Vampire and scored several damaging near misses that broke the destroyer in half and sank her in 10 minutes with the loss of 8 men. Dive bombers from Sōryū and Hiryū never arrived in time to partake in either sinking, and they instead sank the corvette HMS Hollyhack and the tankers SS British Sergeant and SS Athelstane.

As the carriers and their escorts turned back for the Pacific Ocean on 10 April, Admiral Yamamoto decided that Shōkaku and Zuikaku should detach from the group for a planned invasion of Ports Moresby. Consequently on the 18th, Shōkaku detached from the Kido Butai escorted by the destroyers Maikaze and Hagikaze and arrived at Mako on the same day where she was resupplied. Shōkaku left Mako the next day with an escort of destroyer division 27's Shigure, Shiratsuyu, Ariake, and Yūgure where enroute the plans for Operation Mo was finalized; Shōkaku would join Zuikaku and the light carrier Shōhō in neutralizing Australian airbases - and deal with any allied aircraft carriers in the way - to cover the Japanese invasion convoy for Port Moresby. Shōkaku arrived at Truk on the 25th and remained there for the rest of the month.

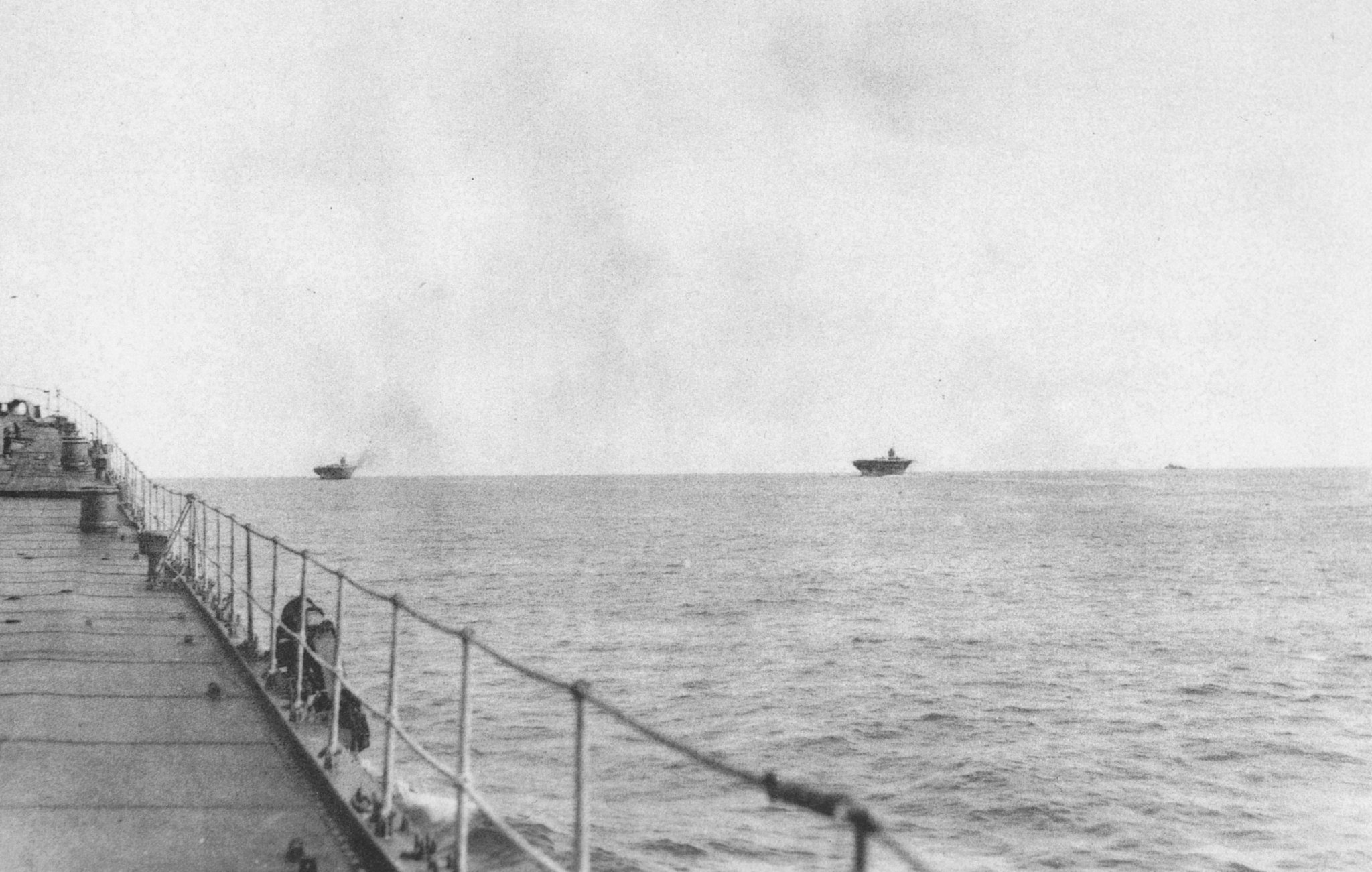
Shōkaku and Zuikaku sailing for the battle of the Coral Sea as seen from the heavy cruiser Haguro, May 1942

=== Battle of the Coral Sea ===
Main Article: Battle of the Coral Sea

On 1 May, Shōkaku and Zuikaku set sail with an escort of the heavy cruisers Myōkō and Haguro and 6 destroyers as the Port Moresby strike force under the command of admiral Takagi who took Myōkō as his flagship. Sailing after them came a secondary group consisting of the light carrier Shōhō, 4 heavy cruisers, and the destroyer Sazanami to attack Tulagi. While underway, the carriers were ordered to deliver 9 A6M Zeros to Truk but these efforts were thwarted by bad weather.

Their secondary mission was still to thwart allied naval forces in defense of Port Moresby, and at around 5:22 it was one of Shōkaku's scout planes located a group of American ships, and at 5:45 "confirmed" the presence of an enemy aircraft carrier and a cruiser. In response, from 6:00 to 6:20 Shōkaku and Zuikaku launched a combined 24 torpedo bombers, 36 dive bombers, and 18 fighters to attack the opposing ships. Over two hours later, the swarm of aircraft found the reported location of the enemy force, only for the reported "aircraft carrier" to turn out to be the fleet oilier USS Neosho, escorted by the destroyer USS Sims. Consequently, the Japanese torpedo bombers were ordered to turn away from the action while the dive bombers scored a pair of easy kills. Four Shōkaku Vals singled out the Sims and nailed the destroyer with three bomb hits. The first sliced through her torpedo tubes before it exploded in her aft engine room, cut all power to the engine and disabled the ship, and blasted off her radar mast. The second bomb set fire to her aft deck house, before the third destroyed her 5-inch (127 mm) gun turret no 4. Sims was buckled amidships and rapidly began to sink by the stern. Half submerged, a massive explosion snapped the dying destroyer in two and bucked both halves 15 feet upwards before she fully slipped beneath the waves with the loss of 176 men, leaving only 15 survivors.

The rest of Shōkaku's air group joined Zuikaku's dive bombers in attacking the Neosho. They hit the fleet oiler with seven direct bomb hits which left her ablaze and in danger of breaking apart. Neosho burnt out for 4 days before being declared a total loss and scuttled. Shōkaku only lost one D3A while the rest of her aircraft returned to their mothership. However, almost concurrently with the attack on Neosho and Sims, Shōho was attacked by a wave of warplanes from two actual American aircraft carriers, the USS Yorktown and USS Lexington, and was sunk to a claimed 13 bomb and 7 torpedo hits.

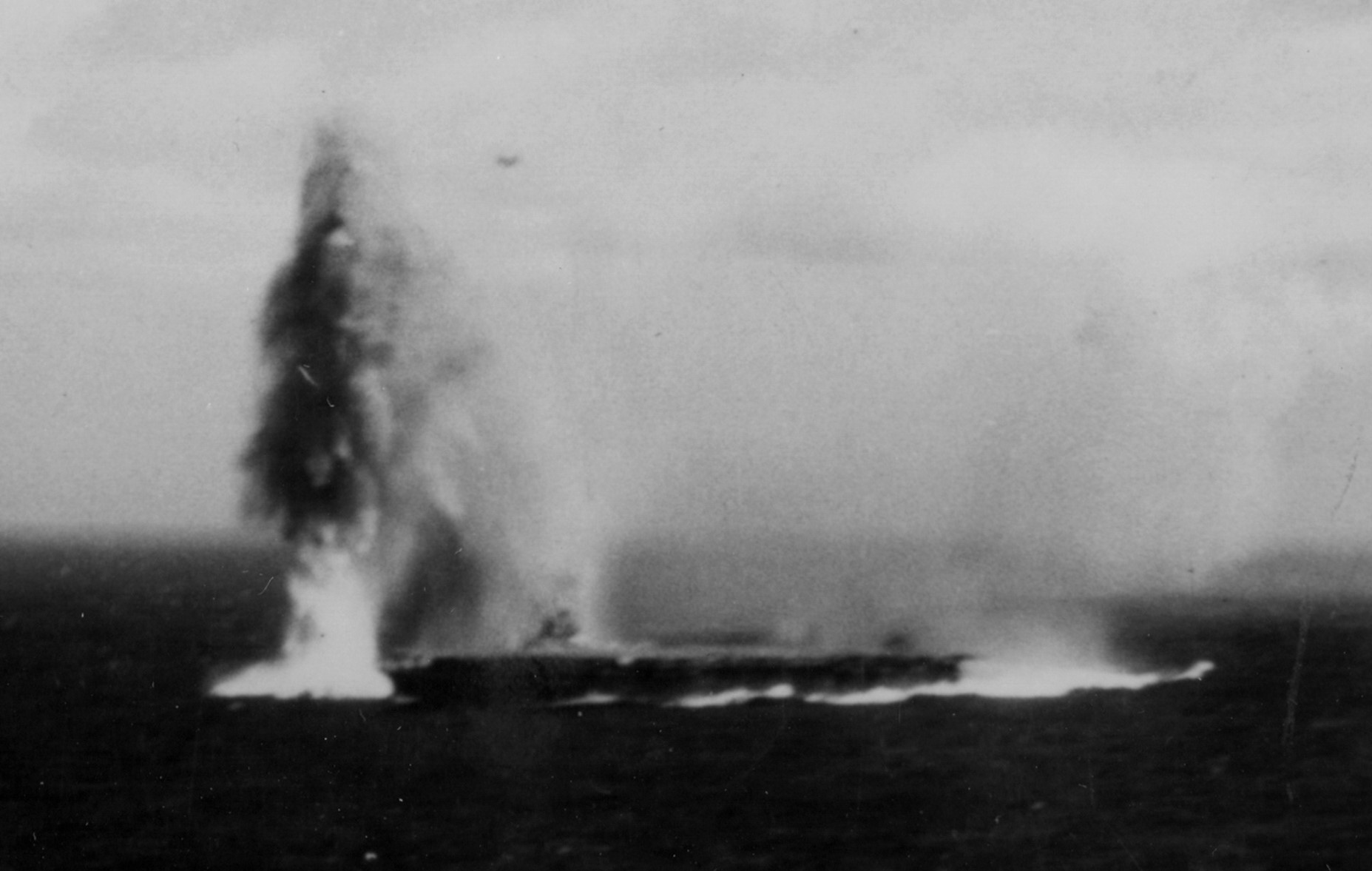
Shōkaku under attack by USS Yorktown dive bombers, 8 May 1942

The next day, Shōkaku's air group of 10 torpedo bombers and 19 dive bombers - assisted by 4 B5N Kates from Zuikaku - scored primary credit for sinking the Lexington with at least 2 bomb hits and 2 torpedo hits, but was herself seriously damaged on 8 May 1942 by dive bombers from Yorktown and Lexington which scored three bomb hits: one on the carrier's port bow, one to starboard at the forward end of the flight deck and one just abaft the island. Fires broke out but were eventually contained and extinguished. The resulting damage required Shōkaku to return to Japan for major repairs.

On the journey back, maintaining a high speed in order to avoid a cordon of American submarines out hunting for her, the carrier shipped so much water through her damaged bow that she nearly capsized in heavy seas. She arrived at Kure on 17 May 1942 and entered drydock on 16 June 1942. Repairs were completed within ten days and, a little over two weeks later on 14 July, she was formally reassigned to Striking Force, 3rd Fleet, Carrier Division 1.

The time required for repairs, combined with the aircraft and aircrew losses incurred by her and Zuikaku, kept both carriers from participating in the Battle of Midway.

Following her return to front-line duty, both Shōkaku and her sister-ship Zuikaku, with the addition of the light carrier Zuihō, were redesignated as the First Carrier Division and took part in the Battle of the Eastern Solomons, where they damaged USS Enterprise, but Shōkaku was in turn damaged by dive bombers of Enterprise, which prevented the bombardment of nearby Henderson Field.

The First Carrier Division subsequently participated in the Battle of the Santa Cruz Islands on 26 October 1942, where they crippled USS Hornet (Hornet was abandoned and later sunk by Japanese destroyers Makigumo and Akigumo). Shōkaku was again seriously damaged, taking at least three (and possibly as many as six) 1,000-lb. bomb hits from a group of fifteen Douglas SBD-3 dive bombers launched from Hornet and USS Enterprise. The Type 21 radar, installed a month ago, enabled the early detection of the incoming U.S. planes, so refueling crews were alerted below deck, giving them time to drain and purge the aviation gasoline lines before they were ruptured by bomb hits, thus saving the ship from the catastrophic avgas fires and explosions that caused most of the carrier sinkings in the Pacific theater. Shōkaku was also fortunate as she had few aircraft on board at the time of the attack. As a result, no major avgas fires broke out and her seaworthiness was preserved. Her flight deck and hangars, however, were left in shambles and she was unable to conduct further air operations during the remainder of the battle. The need for repairs kept her out of action for months, leaving other Japanese defensive operations in the Pacific lacking sufficient airpower.

After several months of repairs and training, Shōkaku, now under the command of Captain Hiroshi Matsubara, was assigned in May 1943 to a counterattack against the Aleutian Islands, but the operation was cancelled after the Allied victory at Attu. For the rest of 1943, she was based at Truk, then returned to Japan for maintenance late in the year.

=== Sinking ===
In 1944, Shōkaku was deployed to the Lingga Islands south of Singapore. On 15 June, she departed with the Mobile Fleet for Operation "A-Go", a counterattack against Allied forces in the Mariana Islands, resulting in the Battle of the Philippine Sea. Her strike waves suffered heavy losses from U.S. combat air patrols and anti-aircraft fire, but some survived and returned safely to the carrier. One of her D4Y Suisei strike groups, composed of veterans from the Coral Sea and Santa Cruz engagements, broke through and one plane allegedly struck home with a bomb that damaged the battleship USS South Dakota and caused many casualties, but this group suffered heavy losses themselves.

Shōkaku was struck at 11:22 on 19 June by three (possibly four) torpedoes from the submarine USS Cavalla, under Commander Herman J. Kossler. As Shōkaku had been in the process of refueling and rearming aircraft and was in an extremely vulnerable condition, the torpedo hits started avgas fires that proved impossible to control. At 12:10, an aerial bomb exploded, detonating aviation fuel vapors which had spread throughout the ship. The order to abandon ship was given, but before the evacuation had progressed very far, Shōkaku abruptly took on water forward and sank quickly bow-first at position 11°40′N 137°40′E, taking 1,272 men with her. The light cruiser Yahagi and destroyers Urakaze, Wakatsuki, and Hatsuzuki rescued Captain Matsubara and 570 men.

== See also ==
- List by death toll of ships sunk by submarines

== Bibliography ==
- Bōeichō Bōei Kenshūjo (1967), Senshi Sōsho Hawai Sakusen. Tokyo: Asagumo Shimbunsha.
- Brown, David (1977). WWII Fact Files: Aircraft Carriers. Arco Publishing. ISBN 0-668-04164-1.
- Chesneau, Roger (1998). Aircraft Carriers of the World, 1914 to the Present. Brockhampton Press. ISBN 1-86019-875-9.
- Dickson, W. David (1977). "Fighting Flat-tops: The Shokakus". Warship International. XIV (1). International Naval Research Organization: 15–46.
- Dull, Paul S. (1978). A Battle History of the Imperial Japanese Navy (1941–1945). Naval Institute Press.
- Hammel, Eric (1987). Guadalcanal: The Carrier Battles. Crown Publishers, Inc. ISBN 0-517-56608-7.
- Jentschura, Hansgeorg; Jung, Dieter & Mickel, Peter (1977). Warships of the Imperial Japanese Navy, 1869–1945. Annapolis, Maryland: United States Naval Institute. ISBN 0-87021-893-X.
- Lengerer, Hans (2014). "The Aircraft Carriers of the Shōkaku Class". In Jordan, John (ed.). Warship 2015. London: Conway. pp. 90–109. ISBN 978-1-84486-276-4.
- Lundstrom, John B. (2005a). The First Team: Pacific Naval Air Combat from Pearl Harbor to Midway (New ed.). Annapolis, Maryland: Naval Institute Press. ISBN 1-59114-471-X.
- Lundstrom, John B. (2005b). The First Team and the Guadalcanal Campaign. Annapolis, Maryland: Naval Institute Press. ISBN 1-55750-526-8.
- Peattie, Mark (2001). Sunburst: The Rise of Japanese Naval Air Power 1909–1941. Annapolis, Maryland: Naval Institute Press. ISBN 1-55750-432-6.
- Polmar, Norman & Genda, Minoru (2006). Aircraft Carriers: A History of Carrier Aviation and Its Influence on World Events. Vol. 1, 1909–1945. Washington, D.C.: Potomac Books. ISBN 1-57488-663-0.
- Rohwer, Jürgen (2005). Chronology of the War at Sea 1939–1945: The Naval History of World War Two (Third Revised ed.). Annapolis, Maryland: Naval Institute Press. ISBN 1-59114-119-2.
- Shores, Christopher; Cull, Brian & Izawa, Yasuho (1992). Bloody Shambles. Vol. I: The Drift to War to the Fall of Singapore. London: Grub Street. ISBN 0-948817-50-X.
- Shores, Christopher; Cull, Brian & Izawa, Yasuho (1993). Bloody Shambles. Vol. II: The Defence of Sumatra to the Fall of Burma. London: Grub Street. ISBN 0-948817-67-4.
- Stille, Mark (2009). The Coral Sea 1942: The First Carrier Battle. Campaign. Vol. 214. Oxford, UK: Osprey Publishing. ISBN 978-1-84908-106-1.
- Stille, Mark (2011). Tora! Tora! Tora:! Pearl Harbor 1941. Raid. Vol. 26. Oxford, UK: Osprey Publishing. ISBN 978-1-84908-509-0.
- Stille, Mark (2007). USN Carriers vs IJN Carriers: The Pacific 1942. Duel. Vol. 6. Oxford, UK: Osprey Publishing. ISBN 978-1-84603-248-6.
- Tully, Anthony P. (30 July 2010). "IJN Shokaku: Tabular Record of Movement". Kido Butai. Combinedfleet.com.
- Tully, Anthony; Parshall, Jon & Wolff, Richard. "The Sinking of Shokaku -- An Analysis". Kido Butai. Combinedfleet.com.
- Zimm, Alan D. (2011). Attack on Pearl Harbor: Strategy, Combat, Myths, Deceptions. Havertown, Pennsylvania: Casemate Publishers. ISBN 978-1-61200-010-7.
