= List of Drifters characters =

The following is a list of characters from Drifters.

== Drifters ==
The titular Drifters are heroes, leaders, and great warriors from different eras and cultures that have been brought to an unknown world by Murasaki, where they are meant to fight the Ends. A common element to the Drifters is that, although they are driven by violence, victory, and conquest, most of them are not cruel and do not tolerate the hurting of innocents. Unlike the Ends, the Drifters have no magic abilities unless they were born with them, and therefore must largely rely on their technology and tenacity to survive.

Murasaki (紫, Murasaki)
Voiced by: Mitsuru Miyamoto (Japanese); David Wald (English)
A mysterious and calm bespectacled man who is responsible for the appearance of the Drifters, using them as a means to right the wrong of the Ends' conquest of the unknown world. He is seen sitting in the middle of the door corridor, smoking, and reading a newspaper that gives news of the events relating to the Drifters. In the corridor, he is associated with and accompanied by light.
Shimazu Toyohisa (島津 豊久, Shimazu Toyohisa)
Voiced by: Yūichi Nakamura (Japanese); Jessie James Grelle (English)
The leader of the Drifters. Historically, he died in 1600 during the Battle of Sekigahara. When he first arrived in the new world, he was critically injured, only to be brought to Nobunaga and Yoichi's hideout by the young elves, Marsha and Mark. Although impulsive and reckless, Toyohisa possesses a fearless, determined, and chivalrous spirit, assisting the elves and dwarves by liberating them from the Orte Empire. Born and raised in a war-torn era, Toyohisa has a keen sense for battle and tactics, though he remains unaware of these talents himself. Toyohisa primarily uses a nodachi in battle, though he is seen carrying a wakizashi. He also carries a Tanegashima on the back of his waist, which he only uses when his swords are infeasible to use against his enemies.
Oda Nobunaga (織田 信長, Oda Nobunaga)
Voiced by: Naoya Uchida (Japanese); Robert McCollum (English)
A famous warlord who conquered most of Japan during Sengoku period. He is known for being the daimyō who took the first step of unification of the Japan, and the first Japanese military commander to utilize arquebuses in battles, using one as his main weapon in battle as a Drifter. Historically, he died during the Honnō-ji incident, the mutiny conducted by Akechi Mitsuhide. As a Drifter, he has only aged six months since arriving in the new world. Nobunaga is highly ambitious and cunning, desiring to establish a multiracial federation in the new world with Toyohisa as their leader. Nobunaga acts as the group's military strategist.
Nasu no Yoichi (那須 与一, Nasu Yoichi)
Voiced by: Mitsuki Saiga (Japanese); Justin Briner (English)
A very androgynous man of nineteen. His full name is Nasu Suketaka Yoichi (那須資隆与一), though he is simply known as Nasu no Yoichi. Although he lived hundreds of years before Nobunaga and Toyohisa, Yoichi is the youngest in the group. Born as the youngest of eleven siblings, Yoichi is a powerful warrior and military commander who served Minamoto no Yoshitsune during the Genpei War. Yoichi's exploits were recorded throughout Japanese history, including in The Tale of the Heike, though Nobunaga notes that Yoichi acts very differently from these historical accounts. During the Genpei War, he was forced to commit several dishonorable acts by Yoshitsune, despite having a strong belief of Bushido. Now as a Drifter, Yoichi resolves to maintain his honorable nature, and he is the most level-headed of the trio. Yoichi acts as the group's archer, killing fleeing enemies.
Hannibal Barca (ハンニバル・バルカ, Hannibaru Baruka)
Voiced by: Yutaka Aoyama (Japanese); R. Bruce Elliott (English)
A famous Carthiginian military commander. Now a Drifter and elderly, he is first seen arguing with Scipio Africanus over the latter's "plagiarism" of Cannae at the Battle of Zama. Despite nearly being killed by the Black King's army, Hannibal still insists that victory is still possible. After being separated from Scipio, Hannibal becomes depressed and senile, but he is still able to articulate battle tactics to his fellow Drifters via indirect means. He acts as Nobunaga's military advisor since being left in Toyohisa's group's care.
Scipio Africanus (スキピオ・アフリカヌス, Sukipio Afurikanusu)
Voiced by: Hiroshi Yanaka (Japanese); Mark Stoddard (English)
Hannibal's Roman adversary during the Second Punic War. As a Drifter, he is as old as Hannibal, who he is seen constantly arguing with, claiming that "a winner takes all" since he won at Zama. Nevertheless, Scipio respects Hannibal greatly. Originally traveling with Hannibal and the Wild Bunch gang, he was accidentally separated from them and is currently in the company of Naoshi Kanno and Tamon Yamaguchi.
Butch Cassidy (ブッチ・キャシディ, Butchi Kyashidi)
Voiced by: Daisuke Ono (Japanese); J. Michael Tatum (English)
Leader of the Wild Bunch gang. He, along with Sundance Kid, was transported from Bolivia, and is now fighting against the Black King and his armies. Unlike his partner, Butch has a hot-blooded and wild personality. He favors the use of firearms, particularly a pair of pistols, in battle.
Sundance Kid (サンダンス・キッド, Sandansu Kiddo)
Voiced by: Wataru Takagi (Japanese); Kent Williams (English)
A member of Butch Cassidy's Wild Bunch. He, along with Butch, was transported from Bolivia, and is now fighting against the Black King and his armies. Unlike his leader, Kid possesses a calm and collected personality. Kid favors the use of firearms in battle, such as shotguns and a Gatling gun.
Naoshi Kanno
Voiced by: Tatsuhisa Suzuki (Japanese); Justin Cook (English)
During a battle with the Black King, with the Drifters' side under attack by dragons, Japanese World War II fighter pilot Naoshi Kanno is transported into the world in his plane. When the dragons' attacks trigger memories of the bombing of Tokyo, he attacks the dragons in anger. His plane later crashed and he soon found himself worshiped as a god by a tribe of anthropomorphic dogs, only to be found by Scipio, who decides to use his status to unite the various anthropomorphic animal tribes under him to bolster the Drifters' army. He does not initially trust Butch or Sundance Kid, as they are American, but Butch manages to convince him that they are Bolivian instead. He is addressed as Sugano Nao in the Dark Horse translation, an alternate reading of his name.
Tamon Yamaguchi (山口 多聞, Yamaguchi Tamon)
Voiced by: Yutaka Nakano (Japanese); Sonny Strait (English)
An admiral of the Imperial Japanese Navy during World War II. Tamon arrived in the new world along with the aircraft carrier Hiryū, and has since formed an uneasy alliance with the leaders of Gu-Binnen, a merchant guild, assisting them against the war with the Orte Empire by leading the guild's griffin naval forces.

== Ends ==
The opposing force in the unknown world and primary antagonists of the series, the Ends are, like the Drifters, mainly composed of powerful historical figures who died under unorthodox and often violent circumstances. Unlike the Drifters, however, the Ends are revered humans that have forsaken their humanity, and are thus capable of using supernatural powers. Most of the Ends are driven completely by an intense hate for humanity for the various betrayals each suffered back on Earth. They seem to have been brought into the new world by EASY, who is at odds with Murasaki.

EASY (イーズィー, Easy)
Voiced by: Kanae Itō (Japanese); Monica Rial (English)
An arrogant and short-tempered young woman with long, black hair, and violet eyes. Apparently at odds with Murasaki, she is responsible for the Ends, an opposing force similar in origin to the Drifters. She primarily uses her laptop to keep tabs on the battles taking place in the other world. In the corridor, she is associated with and accompanied by darkness.
Black King (黒王, Kokuō)
Voiced by: Taiten Kusunoki (Japanese); Jeremy Schwartz (English)
The mysterious leader of the Ends. He claims that he once tried to "save" humans, but he has since shifted his agenda towards non-humans after humans "denied" his efforts. He is shown to possess healing powers and the ability to multiply any life form he wishes, infinitely producing food or wood. He also has puncture scars in both of his palms. His ultimate goal is to eradicate all humans and create a new civilization of non-humans in a perpetual Dark Age, ensuring that they never advance far enough to become as destructive as humans, creating what the Black King believes will be a utopia. In order to achieve this, the Black King has instructed Rasputin to create a simple alphabet and a syncretic religion to allow the different non-human races to find a common ground. His identity has yet to be revealed, but it is heavily implied that he is Jesus Christ.
Hijikata Toshizō (土方 歳三, Hijikata Toshizō)
Voiced by: Hiroki Yasumoto (Japanese); Ian Sinclair (English)
The former vice-commander of the Shinsengumi who died fighting in the name of the Tokugawa Bakufu during the Boshin War. Hijikata has the ability to use smoke to manifest ghostly images of members of the Shinsengumi and uses them to cut apart his enemies. He has become Toyohisa's rival following a battle between the two that ended in a draw. He would later defect from the Ends.
Jeanne d'Arc (ジャンヌ・ダルク, Jan'nu Daruku)
Voiced by: Junko Minagawa (Japanese); Colleen Clinkenbeard (English)
The heroine of the Hundred Years' War between France and England. Jeanne, who was driven insane after being burned at the stake, now desires nothing more than to see the world burn. As an End - with her Christian crosses now upside down - she has manifested the ability to manipulate fire. Surprisingly, she seems to be self-conscious of her (lacking) femininity, though this could be another result of her insanity. Upon facing Toyohisa, she felt true fear for the first time at fighting someone willing to die in order to win. After being defeated by Toyohisa, Jeanne is able to flee the scene alive due to Toyohisa's personal oath to never kill a woman, leading Jeanne to vow revenge for the humiliation.
Gilles de Rais (ジルドレ, Jirudore)
Voiced by: Kenji Nomura (Japanese); Christopher R. Sabat (English)
A French nobleman who was once one of Jeanne's companions-in-arms, but was later executed for multiple cases of alleged murder, sodomy, and heresy. He possessed incredible strength and durability. He continued to accompany Jeanne to battle as a spearman, remaining loyal to her until his death. He was defeated by Butch Cassidy and the Sundance Kid, whereafter he disintegrated into salt. An enraged Jeanne swears to avenge Gilles de Rais's death. He is the first of the Ends to be killed in the series.
Anastasia Nikolaevna Romanova (アナスタシア・ニコラエヴァ・ロマノヴァ, Anasutashia Nikoraevua Romanovua) (Анастасия Николаевна Романова)
Voiced by: Junko Kitanishi (Japanese); Rachel Robinson (English)
The youngest daughter of the last Russian tsar, Nicholas II. Anastasia and her family were shot by a Bolshevik firing squad when Anastasia was seventeen. She has the supernatural ability to create blizzards. Anastasia is depicted as an emotionless woman with little interest in the war between the Ends and Drifters. Though they are often at odds due to opposing elements and views, she is believed to have some level of respect for Jeanne, as Rasputin believes that she was angered that Jeanne was humiliated during her battle against Toyohisa.
Grigori Rasputin (グリゴリー・ラスプーチン, Gurigorī Rasupūchin) (Григорий Ефимович Распутин)
Voiced by: Masahiko Tanaka (Japanese); Christopher Bevins (English)
A famous Russian mystic who once held a great influence over the Russian Imperial Court because of his ability to supposedly heal the Romanov's hemophiliac heir, Alexei. He now serves the Black King as a spymaster for his army, and is often seen by Anastasia's side. Similar to the Octobrists, Rasputin uses magic to possess others via the use of talismans, which he also uses for communication among the Black King's army. He seems to have a history with Count Saint-Germi as both recognize each other's works and political positions.
Akechi Mitsuhide (明智 光秀, Akechi Mitsuhide)
Voiced by: Shō Hayami (Japanese); Brandon Potter (English)
A former general and samurai who served under Nobunaga before his betrayal in 1582, resulting in the latter's (historical) death during the Honnō-ji incident. He is eager to kill Nobunaga during the war between the Drifters and the Ends.
Minamoto no Yoshitsune (源 義経, Minamoto Yoshitsune)
Voiced by: Akira Ishida (Japanese); Greg Ayres (English)
A ruthless general of the Minamoto clan and Nasu no Yoichi's former commander. During the Genpei War, Yoshitsune resorted to dishonorable tactics to achieve victory, something Yoichi despises about him. Likewise, Yoshitsune mocks Yoichi for trying to follow the code of Bushido once they are transported to the new world to fight. His status as a Drifter or End is unknown, and he often remarks that he will go the side that provides him with the most amusement. After previously being aligned with the Black King's army, he would then side with the Drifters.

== Orte Empire ==
The Orte Empire (オルテ帝国, Orute Teikoku) is a country that was established by Hitler. It expanded through the conquest of neighboring territories and continued to adhere to Hitler's principles, which involves the persecution of demihumans races. Recently, the Empire was sold to Toyohisa and the Drifters by Count Saint-Germi, as Hitler had bankrupted the empire before his death. Its capital is Verlina (ヴェルリナ).

Adolf Hitler (アドルフ・ヒトラー, Adorufu Hitorā)
The infamous Führer and Chancellor of Nazi Germany. Revealed to be a Drifter by Count Saint-Germi, Hitler ended up in the current world fifty years before the current storyline and inspired the local humans through speeches at a tavern to rise up and form the Orte Empire, creating brutal discrimination laws against all non-human species living there at the time. He mysteriously committed suicide soon after; however, his followers continued to revere him as the "Father" of their country long after his death.
Count Saint-Germi (サン・ジェルミ伯, San Jerumi Haku)
Voiced by: Tomokazu Sugita (Japanese); Vic Mignogna (English)
A nobleman and Drifter who owns a quarter of the Orte Empire and was Hitler's closest ally in its formation. It is said that the Empire could not have existed without his "betrayal", and as such, he is free to live as he pleases without criticism from any of his peers. Despite this position, however, he is not loyal to the Empire and later betrays the Empire when he realizes its impending demise. He forms an alliance with the Drifters and their allies to take over the Empire. In spite of the fact he is well over fifty years old, Saint-Germi appears as a youthful drag queen with an effeminate personality. He has knowledge of the modern era (due to the fact that he is aware of the existence of firearms and gunpowder), as well as some knowledge of Japanese history.
Mills (ミルズ, Miruzu)
Voiced by: Hirofumi Nojima (Japanese); Micah Solusod (English)
A former tax collector of the elvish colonies. He now works for the elves as a servant.
Aram (アラム, Aramu)
Voiced by: Isshin Chiba (Japanese); Gregory Lush (English)
A cold-blooded knight of the Orte Empire. After being brutally defeated by Toyohisa, he is killed by the elves out of retribution for massacring their people.
Alesta (アレスタ, Aresuta)
Voiced by: Kenji Fukuda (Japanese); Joel McDonald (English)
An aide to Count Saint-Germi.
Flamé (フラメ, Furame)
Voiced by: Koji Yusa (Japanese); Anthony Bowling (English)
An aide to Count Saint-Germi.
Sacred Band of Thebes
A Greek troop made up entirely of pairs of male lovers. They initially worked for the Orte Empire under Count Saint-Germi, but are handed over to Nobunaga after they arrive in Orte. They are armed with Nobunaga's dwarven muskets and decimate the Black King's troops, cutting a path for Toyohisa and the dwarves to reach Hijikata.

== The Octobrist Organization ==
The Octobrist Organization (十月機関) are a group of human magicians that are native to the world whose duty is to observe and gather the Drifters together to fight the Ends. Unlike many humans in this world, Octobrists do not subjugate the demihumans. It is led by Abe no Seimei, who is also a Drifter. Known as Oct (オクト) in the Dark Horse translation.

Abe no Seimei (安倍 晴明, Abe no Seimei)
Voiced by: Takahiro Sakurai (Japanese); Chris Patton (English)
Although his real name is Abe no Haruakira, Haruakira is known famously as Abe no Seimei, a legendary Japanese magician who devoted his life to the extermination of the Ends soon after he first appeared in the new world as a Drifter. He now serves as the leader of the Octobrist Organization.
Olminu (オルミーヌ, Orumīnu)
Voiced by: Shiho Kokido (Japanese); Gwendolyn Lau (English)
A young magician of the Octobrists, code name "Sem (セム, Semu)". She is charged with watching Toyohisa's group of Drifters. She seems to be quite incompetent at reconnaissance, and is terrified of the Drifters she must follow. After she is discovered and kidnapped by Toyohisa's group, she tells them the story of the Drifters and Ends. She is often used as comic relief, shown in a generally incompetent, powerless, and cowardly way, and is a frequent target of sexual harassment by Nobunaga (who calls her names such as "Olminipples"), but can be helpful due to her skills in sorcery, particularly in casting stone walls to assist the Drifters in their plans. Olminu can also serve as a spectator to the story, with the narrative enlightening plot elements through her perception.
Kafet (カフェト, Kafeto)
Voiced by: Masakazu Nishida (Japanese); Aaron Roberts (English)
Kafet, code name "Ham (ハム, Hamu)", is an assistant to Abe no Seimei. He was first charged with bringing Scipio and Hannibal to Seimei after their arrival to their world.

== Elves ==
The elves are a race of demihumans with long, pointed ears. The elves are a community of hunters and gatherers living in small villages across neighboring territories. Elves live five to six times longer than normal humans, and their maturation rate is slower, thus making the elves appearing younger than they actually are. Fifty years prior to the current storyline, they were defeated in the war against the Orte Empire and were forced to live as serfs. Toyohisa liberated the elves to repay his debt to Marsha and Mark for helping him when he first arrived in the new world. They are the first demihuman race to join the Drifters' army in the war against the Orte Empire and the Ends. The elves are natural-born archers, and are led by Yoichi in battles.

Mark (マルク, Maruku)
Voiced by: Tomoko Tsuzuki (Japanese); Apphia Yu (English)
The younger brother of Shara and Marsha. Like the rest of his race, Mark appears as young adolescent boy, though he is actually thirty-six years old. He and Marsha first discovered a wounded Toyohisa when he arrived in their world, and helped him by bringing him to Nobunaga and Yoichi to get his injuries treated. Toyohisa repaid his debt to the brothers by saving them from the Orte soldiers that were trying to kill them and liberating their village from the Orte Empire's tyranny.
Marsha (マーシャ, Māsha)
Voiced by: Sayori Ishizuka (Japanese); Mikaela Krantz (English)
The brother of Shara and Mark, and the second oldest child among the three. Like the rest of his race, Marsha appears as young adolescent boy, though he is actually thirty-nine years old. He and Mark first discovered a wounded Toyohisa when he arrived in their world, and helped him by bringing him to Nobunaga and Yoichi to get his injuries treated. Toyohisa repaid his debt to the brothers by saving them from the Orte soldiers that were trying to kill them and liberating their village from the Orte Empire's tyranny.
Shara (シャラ, Shara)
Voiced by: Junji Majima (Japanese); Jerry Jewell (English)
The older brother of Mark and Marsha. Like the rest of his race, Shara appears as young man, though he is actually 106 years old. He helps lead the elvish rebellion against the Orte Empire after his father is killed by Aram. He is very loyal to Toyohisa and the other Drifters, and often acts as the representative among the elves.

== Other characters ==
Bronze Dragon (青銅竜, Seidōryu)
Voiced by: Rintarou Nishi (Japanese); Phil Parsons (English)
One of the six Great Dragons that govern the winged dragons. Although he objects to the employment of his subjects as the personal "pets" of the Black King, he is soon tortured with his powers and made into a living copper mine.
Doug (ドグ, Dogu)
Voiced by: Riki Kagami
A spy for the Oct who was later killed by Minamoto no Yoshitsune.
Banzelmashin Shylock VIII (バンゼルマシン・シャイロック8世, Banzerumashin shairokku Ha-sei)
Voiced by: Tomoaki Maeno
A noblemen from Gu-Binnen, a merchant guild, who forms an uneasy alliance with Tamon in the war against the Orte Empire. Shylock is the secretary of the Shylock Bank and Trading House, and the admiral of Gu-Binnen's marine fleet. Calculating and astute, Shylock shows interest in obtaining Tamon's Hiryū, but refrains from doing so as not to incur Tamon's wrath.
