= Kaneyoshi Muto =

Japanese flying ace

- 武藤 金義
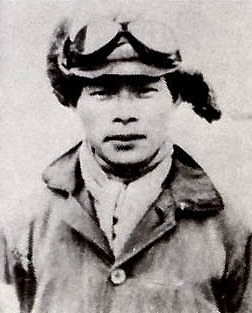
- Born: June 1916; Aichi Prefecture, Japan
- Died: 24 July 1945 (aged 29); Bungo Channel, Japan
- Military career
- Allegiance: Imperial Japanese Navy
- Service years: 1935–1945
- Rank: Ensign
- Nickname: "Sky Musashi"
- Conflicts: Second Sino-Japanese War; World War II; Pacific War

Kaneyoshi Muto (武藤 金義, Mutō Kaneyoshi; June 1916 – 24 July 1945) was a Japanese naval aviator and flying ace known for his great skill in fighter aircraft. Fellow ace Saburō Sakai called him "a genius in the air."

== Second Sino-Japanese War ==
Kaneyoshi Muto was born to a humble farming family in June 1916 in Aichi Prefecture. Muto grew to a height of 1.6 metres (5 ft 3 in) —short in stature—and enlisted in the Imperial Japanese Navy in June 1935 when he was 19. After serving for a brief period aboard the destroyer Uranami he applied for flight training to advance his career. In July 1936 he graduated as a naval aviator and was assigned to the Omura Air Group.

Muto went to war in China flying with the 12th Air Group. He earned his first air victory on 4 December 1937 during the Battle of Nanking when he shot down a Soviet-made Polikarpov I-16. Muto continued fighting in China, flying many sorties over Hankou to become an ace with five victories. For his distinguished service, he was honored with an official commendation on 30 April 1938. Among his fellow pilots he was well-liked for his good sense of humor.

== Pacific War ==
Parallel to the attack on Pearl Harbor, Japanese forces attacked the Philippines. On 8 December 1941 Muto, flying with the 3rd Air Group, took part in the attacks on Iba Airfield and Clark Airfield to eliminate the immediate threat of American air power.

Muto fought further air battles in the Java Sea, in the Solomon Islands, and in New Guinea. He fought alongside Saburō Sakai through mid-1944 on the island of Iwo Jima, surviving to be called by Sakai "the toughest fighter pilot in the Imperial Navy."

In December 1944, Muto was posted to the Japanese Home Islands to join Captain Minoru Genda in his 343rd Kōkūtai formed to defend against Boeing B-29 Superfortress attacks. Muto has also been identified as a tactics instructor with the Yokosuka Air Group, based at Naval Air Facility Atsugi in early 1945. There, Muto flew a powerful Kawanishi N1K-J Shiden, a type codenamed "George" by the Americans. At that time, he and his wife Kiyoko were expecting a child.

On 16 February 1945, Muto and at least nine fellow airmen scrambled to meet an incoming flight of enemy fighters. The Japanese fighters were a mixed group of Mitsubishi A6M Zeros, J2M Raidens, and Kawanishi Shidens such as the one Muto flew. The latter two types were heavily armed, each carrying four 20 mm Type 99 cannon. The enemy was a group of seven U.S. Navy Grumman F6F Hellcats flying from the aircraft carrier Bennington. The Americans were well-trained but this was their first combat, and the Japanese veteran pilots shot down four without loss to themselves. Two of the Americans were killed in action and two were taken prisoner of war.

After the squadron of Japanese pilots landed at Yokosuka, newspaper reporters wrote about Muto alone, ignoring the others in his flight. Muto was said to have fought a dozen Hellcats alone, shooting down four and chasing the others away. They compared him to the legendary Samurai swordsman Miyamoto Musashi, thrusting and attacking with a fighter aircraft rather than a sword. Muto's wife read these triumphant reports while recovering from the birth of their daughter. The story of Muto flying alone was the one related by Genda to Norman Polmar, U.S. Navy historian, and to Masatake Okumiya, Jiro Horikoshi and Martin Caidin, who co-wrote the book Zero!

Muto continued to serve in combat, defending Japan against American forces such as in March 1945 when aircraft from Task Force 58 flew over Shikoku. In June he was posted to the 343rd Air Group, 301st Squadron commanded by veteran ace Naoshi Kanno.

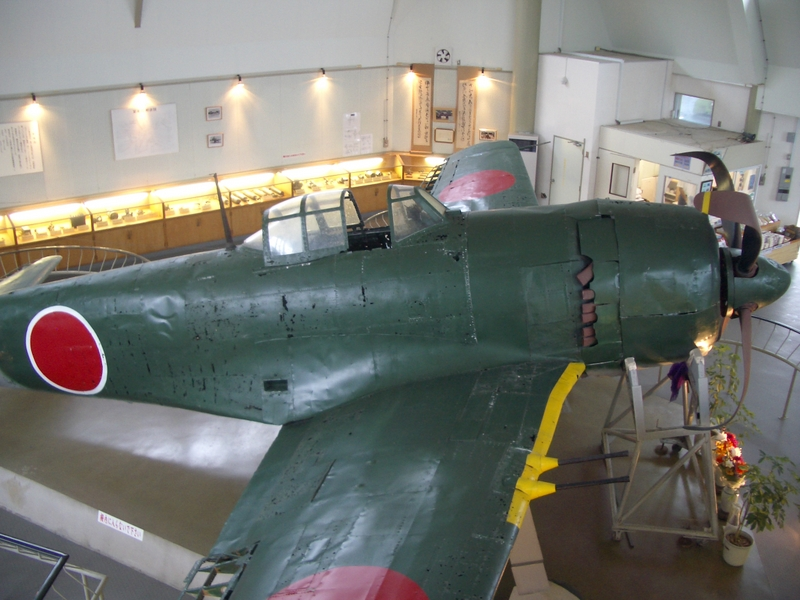
A recovered and preserved Kawanishi N1K-J Shiden, possibly flown by Muto

On 24 July 1945, over the Bungo Channel, Muto and other pilots scrambled to attack a larger group of American fighters which turned out to be Hellcats from VF-49, part of Task Force 38 supporting the bombing of Kure. Greatly outnumbered, Muto was shot down and never seen again. Takashi Oshibuchi, the commander of the 701st Squadron, was also among the six veteran Japanese airmen who did not return from the violent action.

== Legacy ==
Japanese military officials gave Muto credit for 35 aerial victories at the time of his death. Sakai wrote in 1957 that this figure included four B-29s, which were very difficult to shoot down. After the war, Muto was credited with 28 victories by U.S. Air Force researchers studying battle records.

In the 1970s, a Shiden fighter was recovered from the Bungo Channel in shallow water some 200 m (220 yd) from shore. Among the fishermen who helped bring the aircraft to the surface were ones who had witnessed it falling into the water on 24 July 1945. The wrecked aircraft showed no bullet holes and provided no other clue as to what caused it to ditch. It was restored for display and placed in an exhibit at a nearby museum in Shikoku. No evidence is available to identify which 343rd Air Group pilot flew the fighter, so the museum honors all six of the Shiden pilots who lost their lives that day, including Muto and Oshibuchi.
