= 601st Naval Air Group =

- Active: February 15, 1944 – postwar.
- Country: Empire of Japan
- Allegiance: Empire of Japan
- Branch: (Empire of Japan) Imperial Japanese Navy
- Type: Naval aviation unit
- Role: Fighter, interceptor fighter, bomber, torpedo bomber, reconnaissance
- Size: 225 aircraft (initial)
- Part of: 3rd Fleet; 1st Carrier Division; 3rd Air Fleet
- Garrison/HQ: Atsugi, Japan; Seletar, Singapore; Aircraft carrier Taihō; Katori, Japan; Hyakuri, Japan; Kokubu, Japan
- Aircraft flown: A6M Type 0 "Zeke"; N1K1-J Shiden "George"; D4Y Suisei "Judy"; B6N Tenzan "Jill"
- Engagements: World War II: Battle of the Philippine Sea; Battle of Iwo Jima; Battle of Okinawa; Air raids on Japan

Insignia
- Identification symbol: Until 9 July 1944; 311 or 1_{1}; Aircraft carrier Taihō; 312 or 1_{2}; Aircraft carrier Zuikaku; 313 or 1_{3}; Aircraft carrier Shōkaku
- Identification symbol: And after 10 July 1944; 601

The 601st Naval Air Group (第六〇一海軍航空隊, Dai Roku-Maru-Hito Kaigun Kōkūtai) was a carrier air group (later converted to airbase garrison unit) of the Imperial Japanese Navy (IJN) during the Pacific campaign of World War II.

== Structure ==
- Higher unit
  - 3rd Fleet (15 February 1944–9 July 1944)
  - 1st Carrier Division (10 July 1944–9 February 1945)
  - 3rd Air Fleet (10 February 1945–postwar.)
- Lower unit
  - 161st Fighter Squadron (10 July 1944–15 November 1944)
  - 162nd Fighter Squadron (10 July 1944–15 November 1944)
  - 308th Fighter Squadron (20 February 1945–postwar.)
  - 310th Fighter Squadron (20 February 1945–postwar.)
  - 402nd Fighter Squadron (5 March 1945–20 April 1945)
  - 1st Attack Squadron (20 February 1945–postwar.)
  - 161st Attack Squadron (10 July 1944–15 November 1944)
  - 254th Attack Squadron (20 February 1945–5 March 1945)
  - 262nd Attack Squadron (10 July 1944–14 November 1944)
  - 61st Reconnaissance Squadron (10 July 1944–15 November 1944)

== Commanding officers ==
- Cdr. / RADM* Irisa Toshiie (52) - 15 February 1944 - 19 June 1944 (KIA; posthumous two-rank promotion.)
  - Cdr. Irisa was jointly Air Officer of CV Taiho, and was KIA in her sinking.
- VACANT - 19 June 1944 - 10 July 1944
- Cdr. / Capt. Suzuki Masakazu (52) - 10 July 1944 - 10 February 1945 (Captain on 15 October 1944.)
- Cdr. / Capt. Sugiyama Toshikazu (51) - 10 February 1945 - 15 August 1945 (Captain on 1 May 1945.)

== Bibliography ==
- Shin-Jinbutsuoraisha Co., Ltd., Tōkyō, Japan.
  - Kingendaishi Hensankai, Military history of the Imperial Japanese Navy Air Groups and Imperial Japanese Army Flying Regiments, 2001, ISBN 4-404-02945-4.
  - Rekishi Dokuhon, Document of the war No. 48 Overview of Imperial Japanese Navy Admirals, 1999, ISBN 4-404-02733-8.
- The Japanese Modern Historical Manuscripts Association, Organizations, structures and personnel affairs of the Imperial Japanese Army & Navy, University of Tokyo Press, Tōkyō, Japan, 1971, ISBN 978-4-13-036009-8.
- Rekishi Gunzō, History of Pacific War, Gakken, Tōkyō, Japan.
  - Vol. 13, Shōkaku class aircraft carrier, 1997, ISBN 4-05-601426-4.
  - Vol. 22, Aircraft carrier Taihō / Shinano, 1999, ISBN 4-05-602062-0.
  - Extra, Perfect guide, The aircraft carriers of the Imperial Japanese Navy & Army, 2003, ISBN 4-05-603055-3.
- Bunrin-Dō Co., Ltd., Tōkyō, Japan.
  - Famous airplanes of the world No. 69, Navy Carrier Dive-Bomber "Suisei", 1998, ISBN 4-89319-066-0.
  - Koku-Fan Illustrated No. 42, Japanese Imperial Army & Navy Aircraft Color, Markig, 1988.
  - Koku-Fan Illustrated Special, Japanese Military Aircraft Illustrated Vol. 2, "Bombers", 1982.
- Model Art, Model Art Co. Ltd., Tōkyō, Japan.
  - No. 406, Special issue Camouflage & Markings of Imperial Japanese Navy Bombers in W.W.II, 1993.
  - No. 458, Special issue Imperial Japanese Navy Air Force Suicide Attack Unit "Kamikaze", 1995.
  - No. 553, Special issue I.J.N. Carrier Attack Bomber, 2000.
- Japan Center for Asian Historical Records (http://www.jacar.go.jp/english/index.html)%5B‍%5D, National Archives of Japan, Tōkyō, Japan.
  - Reference Code: C08051771200, Transition table of formation of Imperial Japan Navy Air Units (special establishment) during Pacific War, Japan Demobilization Agency, 1949.
