= Squadron of experts =

The Squadron of Experts can refer to two military fighter aircraft units from the Second World War:

- The 343rd Naval Air Group, an Imperial Japanese Navy Air Service fighter group that operated in 1944 and 1945.
- Jagdverband 44, a German Luftwaffe fighter unit that operated in 1945.
