= Yoshio Shiga =

Japanese flying ace

- 志賀 淑雄
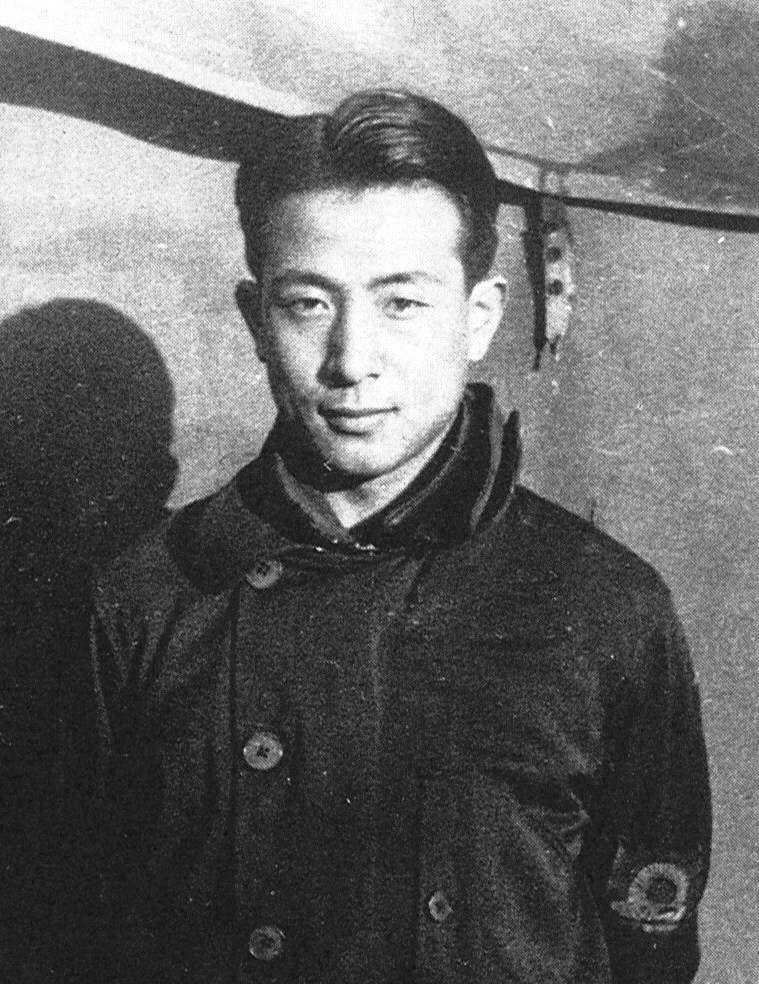
- Shiga in 1938
- Born: 1914; Tokyo, Japan
- Died: November 25, 2005 (aged 90–91); Tokyo, Japan
- Military career
- Allegiance: Empire of Japan
- Branch: Imperial Japanese Navy Air Service (IJN)
- Service years: 1935–1945
- Rank: Lieutenant commander
- Conflicts: Second Sino-Japanese War; World War II; Pacific War; Attack on Pearl Harbor; Battle of Dutch Harbor; Battle of Santa Cruz
- Other work: President of Nobel Kōgyō

Yoshio Shiga (志賀 淑雄, Shiga Yoshio; 1914 – November 25, 2005) was an officer, ace fighter pilot, and leader in the Imperial Japanese Navy (IJN) during the Second Sino-Japanese War and the Pacific theater of World War II. At the December 1941 Attack on Pearl Harbor, Shiga led one of the aircraft carrier Kaga's fighter divisions during the first strike on American forces on Oahu. The number of his Zero fighter was AII-105. Shiga continued as a fighter division commander on Kaga until April 1942.

In May 1942, then Lieutenant Shiga took command of aircraft carrier Jun'yō's fighter group, a post he held until December 1942. During this time, Shiga led the carrier's fighters in the battles of Dutch Harbor and the Santa Cruz Islands. In the latter battle, he attacked the US carriers, USS Hornet (CV-8) and USS Enterprise (CV-6), in which the former was later sunk, while Enterprise was heavily damaged. He subsequently commanded the aircraft carrier Hiyō's fighter group from December 1942 through January 1943 while the carrier was in port in Japan.

After promotion to Lieutenant Commander, Shiga was assigned as air officer to the 343rd Air Group which was engaged in homeland defence in Japan, based at Matsuyama Air Base, in December 1944. He was projected to be Air Group Commander aboard the carrier Shinano during her brief time in service, but was not aboard for her fatal delivery voyage; he instead awaited the ship in Kure with the carrier's planned air group. He is famous for his strong objection against the tactic of suicide attack (Kamikaze) and saved the lives of many young Japanese pilots.

After the war, Shiga became president of police equipment manufacturer Nobel Kōgyō and made many devices, such as bullet resistant vests, and expandable police batons for Japanese police. He died on 25 November 2005.
