= Minoru Genda =

Japanese aviator (1904–1989)

- 源田 実
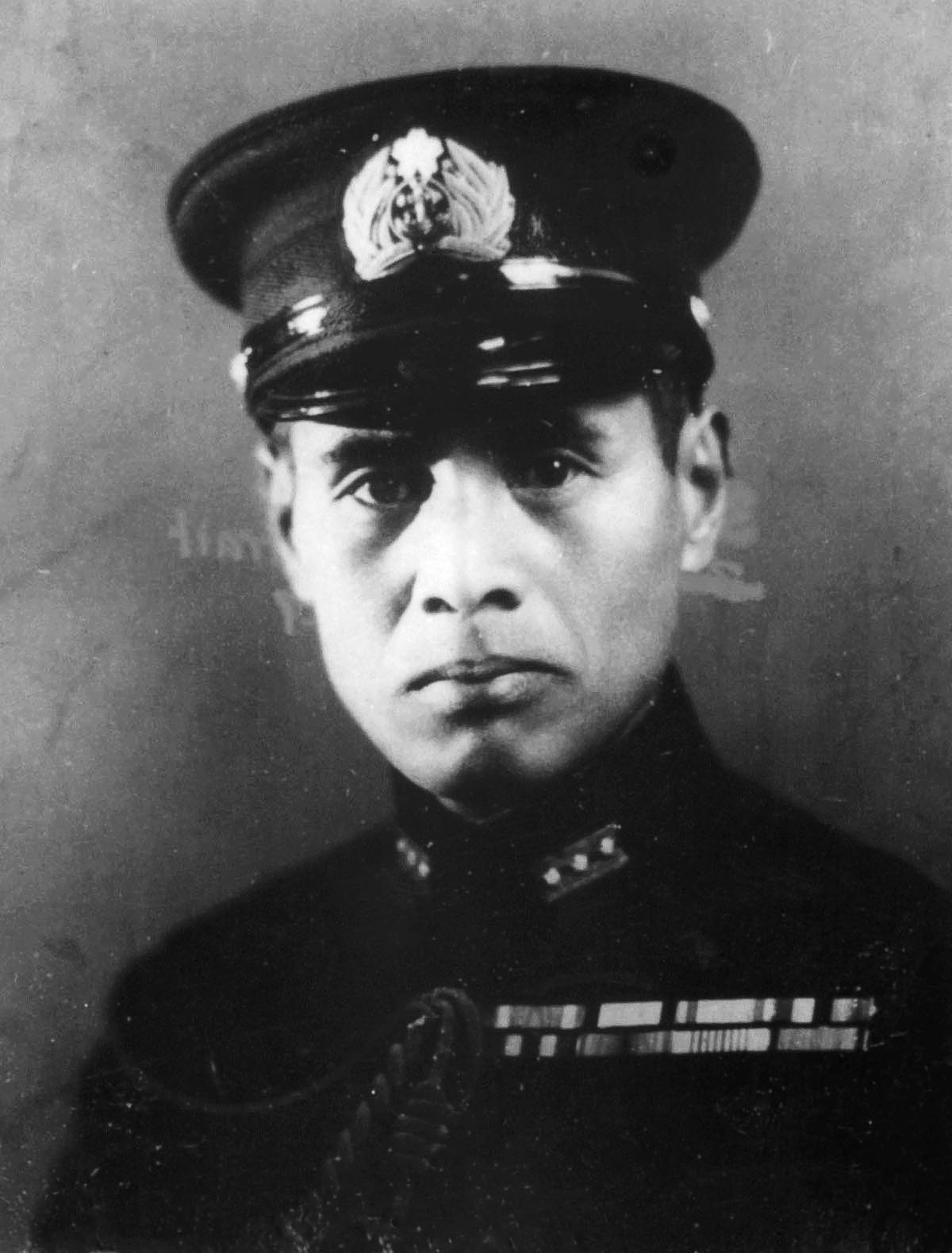
- Born: 16 August 1904; Kake, Yamagata, Hiroshima, Japan
- Died: 15 August 1989 (aged 84); Matsuyama, Ehime, Japan
- Military career
- Allegiance: Empire of Japan; Japan
- Branch: Imperial Japanese Navy; Japan Air Self-Defense Force
- Service years: 1924–1945 (IJN); 1954–1962 (JASDF)
- Rank: Captain (IJN); General (JASDF)
- Commands: Imperial Navy General Staff, Senior Air Officer Zuikaku, Staff officer 1st Air Fleet, Commander, 343rd Kōkūtai, Chief of Staff, JASDF
- Conflicts: World War II; Pearl Harbor attack plan; Battle of Midway
- Awards: US Legion of Merit degree of Commander (1962); Order of the Sacred Treasure, 2nd class (1974); Order of the Rising Sun, 2nd class (1981)

Member of House of Councillors
- In office 8 July 1962 – 7 July 1986
- Constituency: National district

Personal details
- Party: Liberal Democratic

General Minoru Genda (源田 実, Genda Minoru; 16 August 1904 – 15 August 1989) was an Imperial Japanese Navy flight-officer, JASDF general, and politician. Best known for helping to plan the Japanese 1941 attack on Pearl Harbor, he served from 1959 to 1962 as the third Chief of Staff of the Japan Air Self-Defense Force.

== Early life ==
Minoru Genda was the second son of a farmer from Kake, Hiroshima Prefecture, north of the city of Hiroshima. Two brothers were graduates of Imperial University of Tokyo (Tokyo University), another brother graduated from Chiba Medical College, and his youngest brother entered the Army Academy. Genda graduated from the Imperial Japanese Naval Academy in 1924 and took flight training for 11 months in 1928–1929, graduating with honors to become a fighter pilot.

== Early military service ==
Genda was assigned to the aircraft carrier Akagi in 1931. He was well known in the navy, and in 1932 Genda formed a demonstration team at Yokosuka, leading a division of biplanes around the country, conducting aerobatic demonstrations. Known as "Genda's Flying Circus", the team, consisting of Genda, Yoshita Kobayashi and Motoharu Okamura, using Nakajima A2N Type 90 fighters, was part of a public relations campaign to promote naval aviation. He gained combat experience with the Second Combined Air Group during the Second Sino-Japanese War and from the autumn of 1937, was senior flight instructor for the Yokosuka Air Group in 1938.

Most naval strategists and tacticians of the time conceived of single carriers launching raids on enemy targets, or sailing with a fleet to provide air cover against enemy bombers. Genda understood the potential of massed air raids launched from multiple aircraft carriers steaming together. An air power advocate from the time he attended the Japanese Naval Academy, Genda urged Japan's pre-war military leaders to stop building battleships (which he believed would be better used as "piers" or scrap iron) and concentrate on aircraft carriers, submarines, and supporting fast cruisers and destroyers. Above all, Genda thought that a modern and large naval air fleet would be necessary for survival if Japan was ever to fight a war with the United States and the United Kingdom as well as their allies. However, Genda's rank—captain—was too low to be of much strategic influence.

== Pearl Harbor and World War II ==
The Pearl Harbor attack plan was the brainchild of Japanese Admiral Isoroku Yamamoto. Yamamoto ordered a number of officers to study Pearl Harbor and to draw up an operational plan. Admiral Takijiro Onishi gathered together all the relevant facts that could be found about the area. Once this was done, the attack plan itself was written primarily by Rear Admiral Ryunosuke Kusaka with assistance from Captain Genda and deputy chief of staff, Captain Kameto Kuroshima.

Yamamoto had become acquainted with Genda in 1933 when he served aboard the carrier Ryūjō. Yamamoto initially conceived of a one-way attack on Pearl Harbor from 500 to 600 miles (800 to 970 km) away. In his scheme, returning aircraft would ditch in the ocean off Oahu and the pilots would be picked up by destroyers and submarines. Yamamoto was focused on destroying the U.S. Pacific Fleet and sinking as many battleships as possible. Conventional American and Japanese naval doctrine, reflecting the Mahan theory, held that battleships were the instrumental tool of naval supremacy, so it was believed that the destruction of several of these ships would shift the balance of naval power in Japan's favor.

In summer 1940 at the age of 36, Genda was chosen by the Japanese Naval Department to travel abroad as a military attaché to obtain first-hand military accounts of German air offensives and British defensive measures during the Battle of Britain. His assessment of the Royal Air Force (RAF), Hawker Hurricane Mk I and Supermarine Spitfire Mk I fighters against the German Messerschmitt Bf 109E "Emil" later provided evidence that the Japanese Mitsubishi A6M Zero Model 21 could easily outmaneuver these Western European aircraft. The carefully recorded details were secretly documented during his brief tour in London and were hand-carried by Genda during his return trip to Japan for naval department studies. His official trip was in accord with British-Japanese naval accords authorizing official military attaché visits to the war front to observe and document military operations. Genda's Western European trip provided added stimulus for Japanese strategic naval studies and exercises to discover weaknesses and formulate tactics that were later used against the U.S.

On his return to Japan, he was assigned to the First Carrier Division and met with Yamamoto in early February 1941, during which time Yamamoto presented some ideas for attacking the U.S. Pacific Fleet. Genda warmed to his ideas. Genda had previously considered an attack on Pearl Harbor in 1934 and had discussed the possibility then with Takijirō Onishi. Genda emphasized to Yamamoto that "secrecy is the keynote and surprise the all-important factor." Genda felt that the task was "difficult, but not impossible" and began working on the details of the plan. Genda favored a three wave attack using six aircraft carriers for a successful air strike. Genda was responsible for much of the training, especially in the new tactics of shallow-water torpedo use, effective use of level-bombing by tactical aircraft, and coordinating several aircraft carriers simultaneously. He played a key role in persuading IJN leaders to name Mitsuo Fuchida, his classmate at the Japanese Naval Academy, as the leader of the air attack.

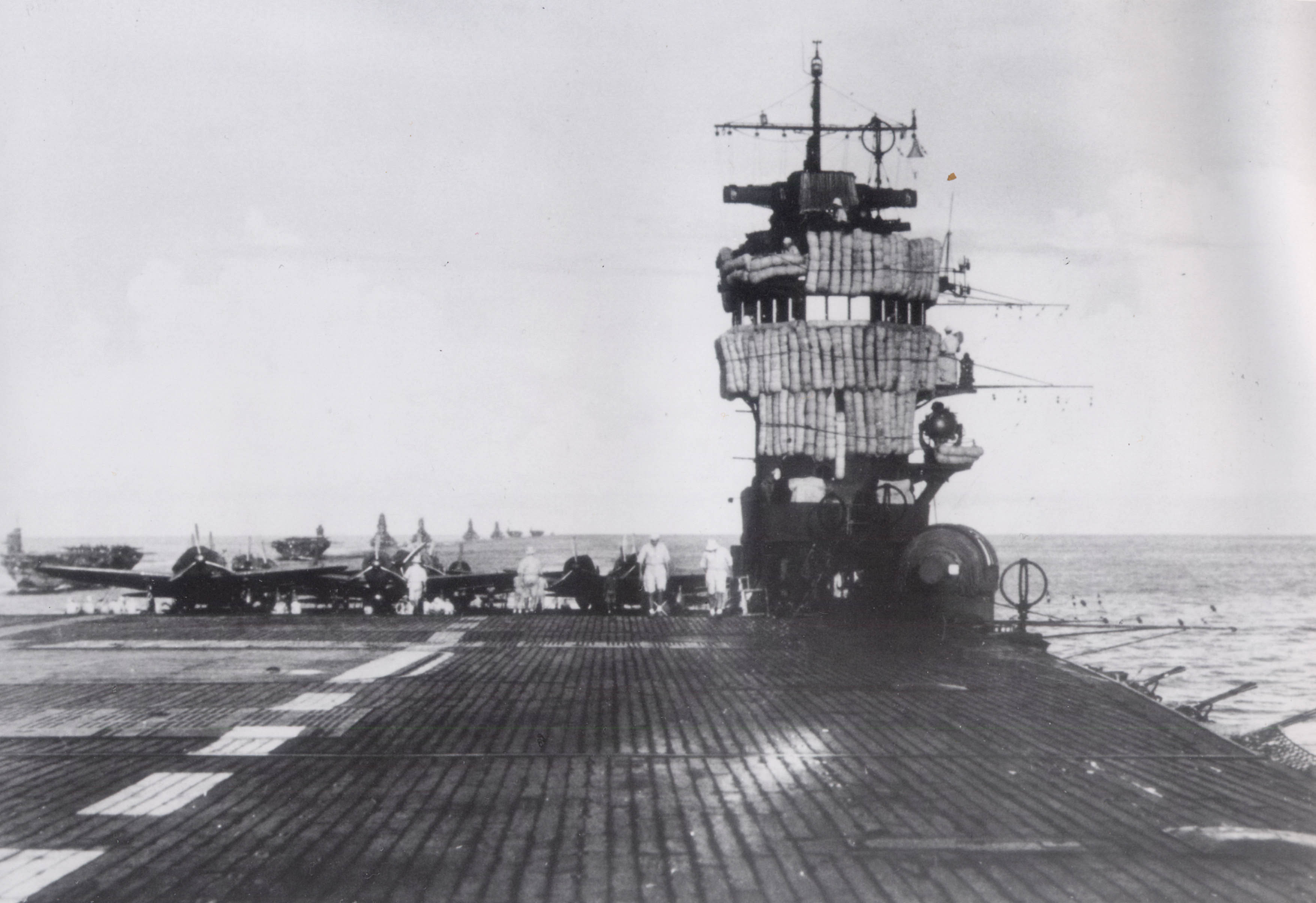
As a staff officer of the 1st Air Fleet from April 1941, Genda assisted Admiral Nagumo on board the Akagi, until she was eventually sunk at the battle of Midway

The surprise attack on Pearl Harbor resulted in the US declaring war on Japan, with 18 American warships sunk or damaged and over 180 American aircraft destroyed. The main Japanese fleet suffered no ship losses and 29 aircraft lost (9 in the first wave and 20 in the second), losses that the Japanese considered acceptable. But this surprise attack eventually led to disaster for Japan. In the four months after the attack, the Imperial Japanese carrier units ranged across the Pacific and Indian oceans causing major damage to Allied forces and bases. Genda and Yamamoto were very disappointed that the three U.S. carriers were not at Pearl Harbor (the first time on a Sunday in 1941 that they were not). Later, the Doolittle Raid brought this phase of the Pacific War to an end, as Japan was bombed for the first time. The Pacific War continued on for three more years.

Genda served with distinction during World War II and personally participated in combat. He was a noted naval aviator and fighter pilot with over 3,000 flight hours. He served on carriers during combat operations in the Indian Ocean, at the Battle of Midway, and in the Solomon Islands. He served on the staff of the 11th Air Fleet at Rabaul before being promoted to Captain in 1944 and reassigned to the Naval General Staff as senior aviation officer. He organized an elite Japanese air unit (the 343rd Kōkūtai) near the war's end to counter the Allied air raids on Japan as an alternative to the suicidal kamikaze units. Genda believed that even late in the war Japanese pilots were capable of fighting experienced American pilots on equal terms if properly trained and supplied with state-of-the-art aircraft. He personally felt that the Kawanishi N1K2-J Shiden-Kai (Allied code name, "George") was equal to the American F6F Hellcat and F4U Corsair. This unit had some success against American aircraft and fought with distinction. However, he ultimately believed that Japanese defeat could be attributed to the continuous aerial defeats they suffered: "[…] our battles were being lost because of defeats at sea. Defeat in battle was caused by the fact that we were overwhelmed in the air war. We were losing the air war because we had failed to secure air superiority with our fighters. In short, we were losing the war because our fighters were being defeated."

Genda documented his World War II experiences in a revealing autobiography, published in Japan.

In September 1961, while visiting London for five days as chief of staff of the Japan Air Self-Defense Force, he commented he had no regrets about the attack on Pearl Harbor except that "We should not have attacked just once--we should have attacked again and again."

== Later military and political career ==
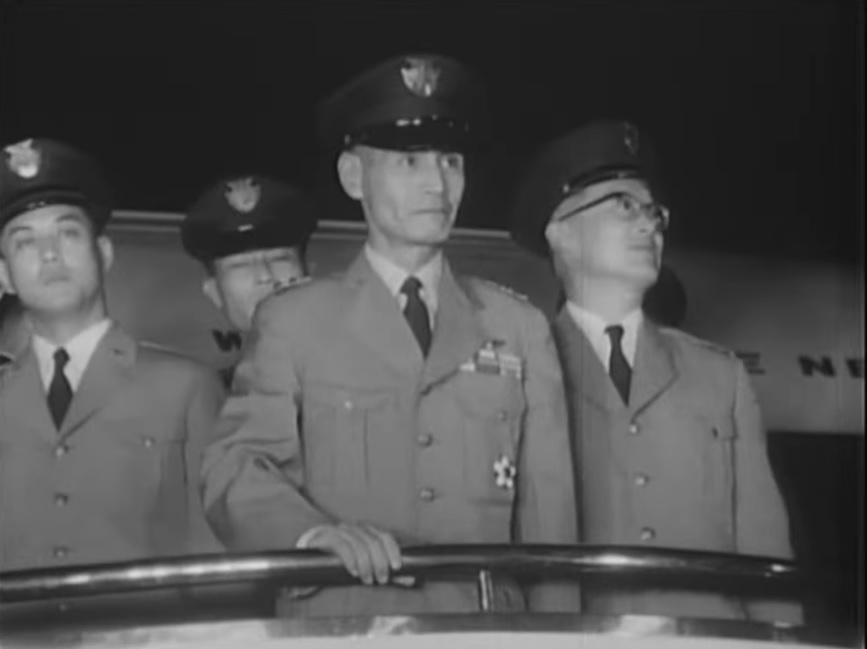
Minoru Genda as Major General of the Japan Air Self-Defense Force（1959）

With the surrender of Japan and subsequent dissolution of the Imperial Japanese Navy, Genda went into private business. After the establishment of the Japan Self-Defense Forces in 1954, Genda was commissioned into the Japan Air Self-Defense Force as a Major General. He served as its chief of staff from 1959 to 1962. As commander of the Air Self-Defense Force, Genda successfully pushed for the acquisition of the F-104 Starfighter, of which Japan bought 230. This became part of the Lockheed bribery scandals, as evidence emerged that Lockheed had paid him a bribe. Genda visited Lockheed's headquarters in California and at his own request personally flew a Starfighter. He was awarded the Legion of Merit by the United States Air Force a few months later.

After retiring from the military in 1962, he ran for and was elected to the upper house of Japan's legislature, the House of Councillors, as a member of the Sato Faction within the Liberal Democratic Party. He was the first of several former SDF officers who entered politics under the auspices of the Sato Faction, mostly at the far right end of the Japanese political spectrum. He remained influential in politics for more than 20 years, as a leading member of the Defense Division of the LDP's Policy Affairs Research Council, often representing the hardline nationalist position advocating abrogation or curtailment of Article 9 of the postwar Japanese Constitution and open remilitarization of the armed forces. During a speaking engagement in the U.S. Naval Academy in 1969, in response to a question from the audience, he said that he thought the Japanese would have used the atomic bomb if they had had it; in the resultant uproar in Japan he was forced to resign as chief of the defense policy board of the LDP, although he kept his seat in the legislature. He is particularly well known for his fierce opposition, along with 12 other far-right LDP Diet members, to Japan's ratification of the Nuclear Non-Proliferation Treaty during the 1974–1976 session of the Diet, on the grounds that Japan might one day need to acquire its own nuclear arsenal.

Genda died in Matsuyama on 15 August 1989, exactly 44 years to the day after the Japanese surrender in World War II, and one day short of his 85th birthday. He was married and had three children.

Military offices
Preceded by Sadamu Sanagi	Chief of Staff; Japan Air Self-Defense Force; 1959-1962	Succeeded by Takeshi Matsuda
