= 343rd Naval Air Group =

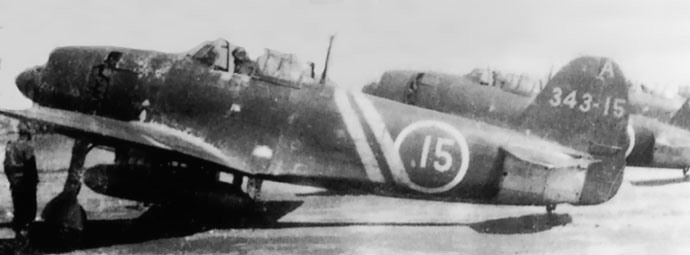
- Naoshi Kanno's Kawanishi N1K2-J "343 A-15" of 301st Fighter Squadron/343rd Naval Air Group, Matsuyama air base, 10 April 1945.
- Active: January 1, 1944–July 10, 1944; December 25, 1944–postwar
- Country: Empire of Japan
- Branch: (Empire of Japan) Imperial Japanese Navy
- Type: Naval aviation unit
- Role: Fighter, interceptor fighter
- Size: various
- Part of: First generation 1st Air Fleet; 61st Air Flotilla; Second generation 25th Air Flotilla; 3rd Air Fleet; 5th Air Fleet; 72nd Air Flotilla
- Garrison/HQ: First generation Kagoshima, Japan; Tinian, Marianas; Peleliu, Palau; Second generation Matsuyama, Japan; Kanoya, Japan; Kokubu, Japan; Ōmura, Japan
- Nicknames: First generation Hayabusa Corps (隼部隊); Second generation Tsurugi Corps (剣部隊)
- Aircraft flown: A6M Type 0 "Zeke"; N1K1-J Shiden "George"; N1K2-J Shiden-Kai "George"; C6N1 Saiun "Myrt"
- Engagements: World War II: Mariana and Palau Islands campaign; Air raids on Japan

Commanders
- Notable commanders: Minoru Genda

Insignia
- Identification symbol: First generation 隼 (Hayabusa, used in Japan homeland); 43 (outside Japan homeland)
- Identification symbol: Second generation 343 with squadron code example; 343 A-xx (301st FS)

The 343rd Naval Air Group (第三四三海軍航空隊, Dai San-Yon-San Kaigun Kōkūtai) was an aircraft and airbase garrison unit of the Imperial Japanese Navy (IJN) during the Pacific campaign of World War II. Created in late 1944 due to the desperate situation of Japan in the closing stages of the war, the 343rd was composed of the best surviving ace fighter pilots the Imperial Navy had at the time, with Captain Minoru Genda in command. This unit was equipped with the best airplane Japan had left by then, the Kawanishi N1K2-J Shiden-Kai, known as George by the Allies; this aircraft could compete with the best wartime Allied fighters, namely, the F6F Hellcat, the P-51 Mustang and the F4U Corsair.

== Operational history ==
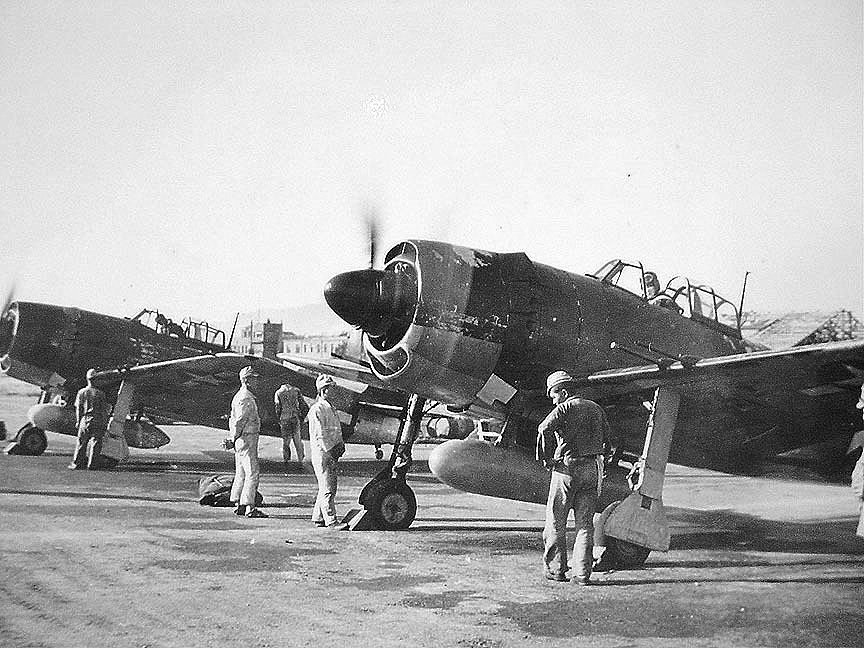
Captured Kawanishi N1K2-Js having their Homare engines run up by former JNAF groundcrew

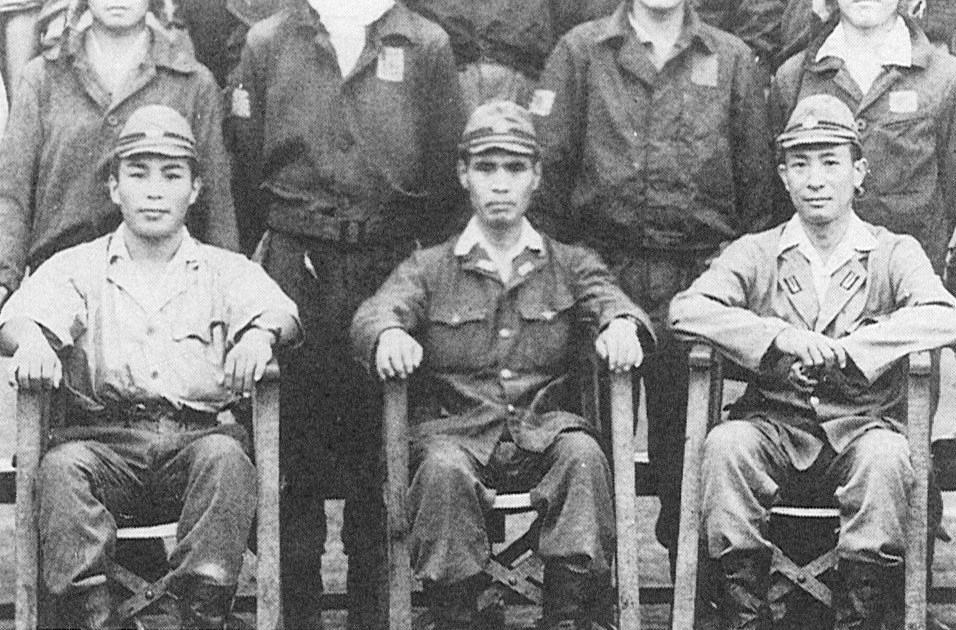
Minoru Genda and staff officers of the 343rd Kōkūtai, including Yoshio Shiga in July 1945

IJN 343rd Air Group (343 Kōkūtai Naval Fighter Group), commanded by Minoru Genda, which was constituted on 25 December 1944. The new 343rd Kōkūtai consisted of the best pilots, including Kaneyoshi Muto. The unit was issued the best equipment available and was also equipped with the new Nakajima C6N Saiun, codenamed "Myrt" long-range reconnaissance aircraft.

On 18 March 1945, one of the "Myrts"' managed to spot U.S. carriers en route to Japan. The following morning, 343 Kōkūtai's Shidens intercepted 300 American aircraft. Many of the 343 Kōkūtai Shiden force were N1K2s. When the Shidens encountered VBF-17 Hellcats, three aircraft were lost on both sides in the initial attack; one Hellcat and two Shiden were shot down by enemy ground fire, two fighters collided in mid-air, and one Hellcat crashed while trying to land. Then the other Shiden dove on the Hellcats, downing another one. In the end, the 407 Hikōtai lost six fighters versus downing eight VBF-17 Hellcats.

In another encounter with VBF-10 Corsairs, two of the Corsairs were separated from the main formations, and then attacked by 343rd Shidens. Four N1K2s were shot down and the Corsairs managed to return to their carrier, USS Bunker Hill. An opportunity for revenge came when VMF-123 Corsairs were surprised by Shidens, initially mistaken for Hellcats. A 30-minute aerial duel ensued in which three Corsairs were shot down and another five were damaged. Three other F4Us which had landed on carriers were so heavily damaged that they had to be pushed into the sea. Of the 10 Japanese aircraft the Americans claimed, not one was effectively downed. Two Shidens however, were shot down at landing by Hellcats of VF-9. Many other Shidens were destroyed by American fighters over another airfield, where they tried to land because they were low on fuel. At the end of the day, 343° declared 52 victories, U.S. fighters 63. The actual losses were 15 Shidens and 13 pilots, a "Myrt" with its three-man crew, and nine other Japanese fighters. The U.S. also had heavy losses, with 14 fighters and seven pilots, and 11 other attack aircraft.

Five days later, an unofficial award was sent to 343 Kōkūtai for the valour shown on 19 March. On 12 April 1945 another fierce battle involved 343°, during Operation Kikusui II. The Japanese scored several victories but suffered 12 losses out of 34 machines. On 4 May, another 24 Shidens were sent in Operation Kikusui V.

The 343 Kōkūtai, remained operational until the overwhelming unit losses led to its eventual retirement. According to one source, 91 pilots from the 343 Kokutai died in battle. The 343rd was disbanded on 14 August 1945, when the Emperor ordered surrender.

== First generation ==
=== Structure ===
- Higher unit
  - 1st Air Fleet (1 January 1944–31 January 1944)
  - 61st Air Flotilla (1 February 1944–10 July 1944, dissolved.)
- Commanding Officers
  - Cdr. Takenaka Masao (51) - 1 January 1944 - 10 July 1944

== Second generation ==
Reborn as interceptor fighter unit.

=== Structure ===
- Higher unit
  - 25th Air Flotilla (25 December 1944–4 February 1945)
  - 3rd Air Fleet (5 February 1945–4 May 1945)
  - 5th Air Fleet (5 May 1945–24 May 1945)
  - 72nd Air Flotilla (25 May 1945–postwar.)
- Lower unit
  - 301st Fighter Squadron (25 December 1944–postwar.)
  - 401st Fighter Squadron (5 February 1945–postwar.)
  - 402nd Fighter Squadron (5 February 1945–28 February 1945)
  - 407th Fighter Squadron (25 December 1944–postwar.)
  - 701st Fighter Squadron (25 December 1944–postwar.)
  - 4th Reconnaissance Squadron (1 February 1945–30 April 1945)
- Commanding officers
  - Vacant - 25 December 1944 - 26 December 1944
  - Captain Iwao Minematsu (48) - 26 December 1944 - 15 January 1945
  - Captain Minoru Genda (52) - 15 January 1945 - 7 October 1945
    - Captain Genda also served as commanding officer of the 352nd Naval Air Group, from 27 June 1945 through 8 July 1945.

== See also ==
- Jagdverband 44

== Bibliography ==
- Kingendaishi Hensankai, Military history of the Imperial Japanese Navy Air Groups and Imperial Japanese Army Flying Regiments, Shin-Jinbutsuoraisha Co., Ltd., Tōkyō, Japan, 2001, ISBN 4-404-02945-4.
- The Japanese Modern Historical Manuscripts Association, Organizations, structures and personnel affairs of the Imperial Japanese Army & Navy, University of Tokyo Press, Tōkyō, Japan, 1971, ISBN 978-4-13-036009-8.
- Seiki Sakamoto/Hideki Fukukawa, Encyclopedia of organizations of the Imperial Japanese Navy, K.K. Fuyo Shobo Shuppan, Tokyo, Japan, 2003, ISBN 4-8295-0330-0.
- Bunrin-Dō Co., Ltd., Tōkyō, Japan.
  - Famous airplanes of the world
    - No. 56, Type Zero Carrier Fighter Model 22–63, 1996, ISBN 4-89319-053-9.
    - No. 124, Kyofu, Shiden, Shidenkai, 2007, ISBN 978-4-89319-158-8.
  - Koku-Fan Illustrated No. 42, Japanese Imperial Army & Navy Aircraft Color, Marking, 1988.
- Model Art, Model Art Co. Ltd., Tōkyō, Japan.
  - No. 510, Special issue Camouflage & Markings of the I.J.N. Fighters, 1998.
  - No. 587, Special issue Imperial Japanese Navy Fighter N1K1 Kyōfū, N1K1-J Shiden, N1K2-J Shidenkai, 2001.
- Japan Center for Asian Historical Records (http://www.jacar.go.jp/english/index.html), National Archives of Japan, Tokyo, Japan.
  - Reference Code: C08051771200, Transition table of formation of Imperial Japan Navy Air Units (special establishment) during Pacific War, Japan Demobilization Agency, 1949.
