= Kōkūtai =

Military aviation unit in the Imperial Japanese Navy Air Service

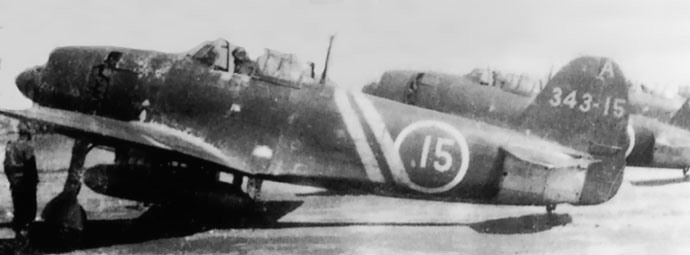
Kawanishi N1K2-J "343 A-15" of 301st Hikōtai/343rd Kōkūtai, Matsuyama air base, 10 April 1945.

A kōkūtai (航空隊) was a military aviation unit in the Imperial Japanese Navy Air Service (IJNAS), similar to the air groups in other air arms and services of the time. Some comparable units included wing in the British Royal Air Force, gruppe in the German Luftwaffe, and groupe in the French Armée de l'Air.

A kōkūtai could be based at land or on board aircraft carriers and could contain hundreds of men and aircraft. For example, the famous 343 Kōkūtai was a land-based fighter group while the 652nd Kōkūtai was a carrier-based bomber group. Kōkūtai were divided into smaller units called hikōtai, which were the equivalent of a squadron. Kōkūtai were usually divided into three hikōtai. In general, most pilots and aircrew in the Imperial Japanese Navy Air Service were non-commissioned officers. The word kōkūtai is abbreviated with the suffix "-ku" (空). The term "343 Ku", for example, stands for 343 Kōkūtai. In the Imperial Japanese Army Air Service (IJAAS) the equivalent unit was the sentai.

== Organisation ==
Kōkūtai (air group) was equivalent to a US group or a RAF wing. A kōkūtai in the broadest terms could comprise a flight and base element of either a carrier or land based air group. In terms of the flight element, it was generally composed of 18 to 27 aircraft and took the name of the carrier or air station where it was originally formed. It could also be either homogeneous or composed of different types of aircraft. The land-based units had larger numbers of aircraft, and could number from approximately 24 to a 100 or more aircraft. They were more homogeneous and came under the command of the naval district where their home naval air station was located in, and later were designated either by a number or by the name of that particular station.

The air groups and stations outside those ports were placed under the command of the nearest naval base (chinjufu). From the establishment of the IJN's first land based air unit at Yokosuka Air Group, Yokosuka until the end of the Pacific war, the term kōkūtai meant both a naval air station and the flying unit that was stationed there. The flying unit (hikōtai) operated the aircraft, and the rest of the personnel of any kōkūtai operated and maintained the ground facilities of the station at which the unit was stationed. Just as the aircraft and flight crew on board a Japanese carrier or a seaplane tender were made an integral part of a ships complement, when land-based or shore based (seaplane) air units were formed, the bases at which they were stationed were seen as equivalent to the ship of assignment for the carrier-based hikōtai. There were over 90 naval air groups at the start of the Pacific War.

== History ==
The land-based kōkūtai system was set up in 1916, determined that naval air stations and air groups would be organized as needed, at either naval ports (gunkō) or strategic ports (yōkō). Their designations were taken from the names of those places and functioning under the authority of those stations. In 1919, the IJN set out new regulations that in a time of war, emergency or maneuvers provided for the organization of "special air groups" (tōkusetsu kōkūtai), which could be designated either by a place or by a numerical designation. They could be either land- or carrier-based, but in general they were largely land-based and would be given numerical designations. In most cases the basis of these formations were created from elements drawn from existing air groups. The first such unit was the 11th Air Group, established briefly in 1936. While regulations establishing land-based air groups were set forth in 1916 and 1919, it was not until the early 1930s that a series of regulations and instructions, set forth the specific internal organizations of air groups, their locations, functions, and their training, though these changed from time to time right up to the end of the Pacific War.

In November 1936, the IJN arranged for the organization of special combined air groups (tōkusetsu rengō kōkūtai), which were composed of two or more air groups. They were created in order to provide greater air strength under a single command. The 1st and 2nd combined air groups were formed in July 1937, at the beginning of the China War, and were the backbone of the navy's air operations in the first several years of that conflict. Standing combined air groups (jōsetsu rengō kōkutai) intended to be more permanent, were established in December 1938. Two of these were established before the Pacific War: the 11th was organized in December 1938, and the 12th which was formed in 1939. Until the very end of the 1930s most kōkutai were composed of a mix of aircraft types, with seaplanes predominating initially, but with carrier-type fighters, dive bombers, and torpedo bombers increasing in numbers, along with land-based twin engined medium bombers. However, by 1941 the IJN's land-based air groups were almost always composed of one type of aircraft, the exception was the Chitose air group which was based in Micronesia and was composed of both medium bombers and fighters. On November 1, 1942, all land-based identified with base names were given numerical designations.

As the war in the Pacific progressed, this structure lacked flexibility and hampered front-line operations, consequently, in March 1944 the IJN's land-based air forces were restructured, and certain hikōtai were given independent numerical designations and an identity of their own outside the parent Kōkūtai.

== Notable Kōkūtai ==
- The 201st Kōkūtai
- The Tainan Kōkūtai
- The 343 Kōkūtai (also called Tsurugi Butai)
- The 601st Kōkūtai
- The 652nd Kōkūtai
- The 721st Kōkūtai
- The Yokosuka Kōkūtai

== See also ==
- Imperial Japanese Navy Air Service
- Imperial Japanese Navy
