= Naoshi Kanno =

Japanese fighter pilot in World War II

- 菅野 直
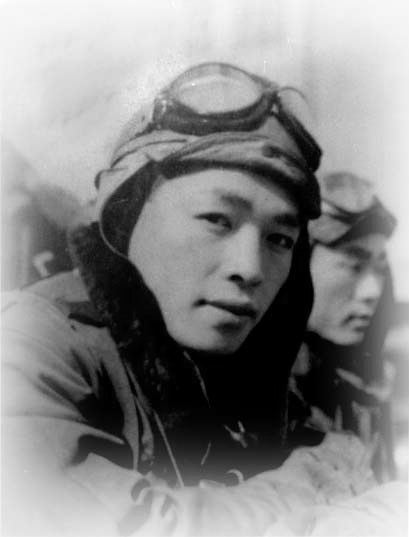
- Naoshi Kanno waiting his turn during training at Lake Kasumigaura (June 1942, 38th class flight student)
- Born: 23 September 1921; Heijō, Chōsen, Empire of Japan (modern-day North Korea)
- Died: 1 August 1945 (aged 23); Off Yakushima, Ōsumi Islands, Japan
- Military career
- Allegiance: Empire of Japan
- Branch: Imperial Japanese Navy
- Service years: 1943–1945
- Rank: Commander (posthumously)
- Nicknames: Bulldog; Yellow Fighter; Kanno the Destroyer
- Unit: 343rd Naval Air Group
- Conflicts: World War II

Naoshi Kanno (菅野 直; 23 September 1921 (Note: There is also a theory that his birthday was October 13, 1922.) – 1 August 1945) was a Japanese fighter ace in World War II. He is credited with 25 confirmed kills.

Piloting his Shiden-Kai, which had yellow stripes painted on its fuselage, he invented the "anti-large bomber tactic" of flipping over and diving headfirst vertically into the enemy aircraft from an altitude of more than 1,000 meters ahead of it, attacking it from directly above. So, he was feared by the pilots of large fighter planes of the US military and was nicknamed the "Yellow Fighter."

== Life and career ==
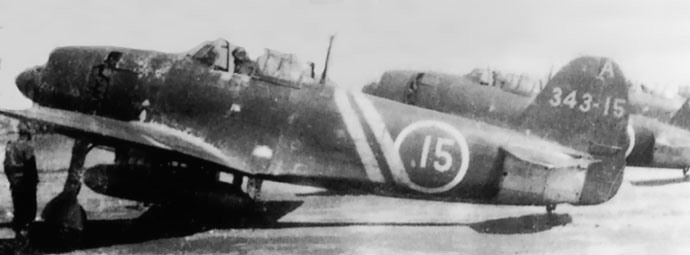
Kanno's Kawanishi N1K had extra stripes painted on it; he hoped they would lure enemies into attacking him.

Kanno was born on 23 September 1921, as the second son in Ryukou, Korea under Japanese rule (now near Pyongyang, North Korea), where his father was posted as the police chief. He grew up in Edano Village, Igu District, Miyagi Prefecture; his parents were from the same area.

Kanno attended Kakuda Junior High School, where he was devoted to Takuboku Ishikawa, liked tanka, and formed a literary circle with his classmates. Some tanka of Kanno were selected for the literary section of the Kahoku Shimpo. In his diary from that time, he wrote, "I wonder if Takuboku was a person like me," and in his diary entry for September 14, 1938, he wrote, "The reason Napoleon does not interest me is because he is a materialist who does not understand the pathos of things." He was thinking about studying literature, and when he was in the fourth year of junior high school, he was studying for university entrance exams, but for financial reasons, decided to join the military.

Kanno enrolled in the Japanese Navy Academy in December 1938, graduating in February 1943 in the 70th class. Upon completion of flight school, he was assigned to the front lines in April 1943, joining the 343rd Naval Air Group, quickly becoming a squadron commander (buntai leader) and by July 1944, he was leading (as the hikotai leader) the 306th Squadron of the 201st Naval Air Group. He gained a reputation as a rebellious but skillful fighter pilot. Initially based in Micronesia, his unit fought many engagements over the Philippines and Yap island. On 27 October 1944, he claimed to have shot down 12 Grumman F6F fighter planes. He made requests to transfer to a kamikaze unit, but the requests were denied, as he was considered too valuable a pilot to sacrifice. In December 1944, he became the squadron commander of the 301st Squadron of the 343rd Air Group. His unit moved back to Kyushu in the Japanese home islands toward the end of the war.

== Disappearance and aftermath ==
Kanno's final mission took place on 1 August 1945, two weeks before the end of the war, when he took off to intercept a group of B-24 bombers escorted by P-51 Mustang fighters off the island of Yakushima, south of Kyushu. He sustained damage when the barrel of his gun exploded, and went missing in action shortly afterwards, presumed dead. His remains were never found, and his favorite wallet was subsequently enshrined at Yūshūkan in Yasukuni Shrine in Tokyo, Japan. He was posthumously promoted two ranks to Commander.

== In fiction ==
=== Manga, Anime ===
- Taka of Shiden-Kai (jp) by Tetsuya Chiba
- Drifters by Kouta Hirano
  - Kanno is one of the protagonists of this manga and anime, where he was voiced by Tatsuhisa Suzuki.
- Shiden-Kai 343 by Souichi Moto

== See also ==
- List of people who disappeared mysteriously at sea

== Sources ==
- Akizuki, Tatsuro (2013). 零の戦記―堀越二郎、坂井三郎、岩本徹三…空のサムライたちの物語 [Zero's War Chronicles: Jiro Horikoshi, Saburō Sakai, Tetsuzō Iwamoto... The Story of the Samurai of the Sky] (in Japanese). PHP editors group. ISBN 978-4-569-81690-6.
- Ikari, Yoshiro (2022) [1st pub. Kojinsha:1991]. 最後の撃墜王―紫電改戦闘機隊長菅野直の生涯 [The Last Fighter ace: The Life of Naoshi Kanno, Commander of the Shiden Kai Fighter Squadron]. Kojinsha NF Bunko (in Japanese) (New ed.). Ushioshobokojinshinsha. ISBN 978-4-7698-3275-1.
- Monthly magazine Maru, ed. (2010). 最強戦闘機紫電改―甦る海鷲 [The Strongest Fighter Aircraft, Shiden Kai - The Resurrection of the Sea Eagle] (in Japanese). Kojinsha. ISBN 978-4-7698-1456-6.
- Miyazaki, Isamu; Kono, Shusaku (Supplementary manuscript) (2013) [1st pub. Kojinsha:1993]. 還って来た紫電改―紫電改戦闘機隊物語 [The Return of the Shiden Kai - The Story of the Shiden Kai Fighter Squadron]. Kojinsha NF Bunko (in Japanese) (New ed.). Ushioshobokojinshinsha. ISBN 978-4-7698-2486-2.
- Hirayanagi, Takeshi; Wakasugi, Ai (2026). 奇跡のクラスヘッド〜山本五十六が信頼し、菅野直、関行男が仰ぎ見た男の海軍兵学校時代の日記を読み解く〜 [A Miracle Head of the Class: Decoding the Naval Academy Diary of a Man who was trusted by Isoroku Yamamoto and looked up to by Naoshi Kanno and Yukio Seki] (in Japanese). Amazon (Independently published). ASIN B0GQJNN7P5.
