= National Archives of Japan =

Coordinates: 35°41′24.8″N 139°45′13.8″E

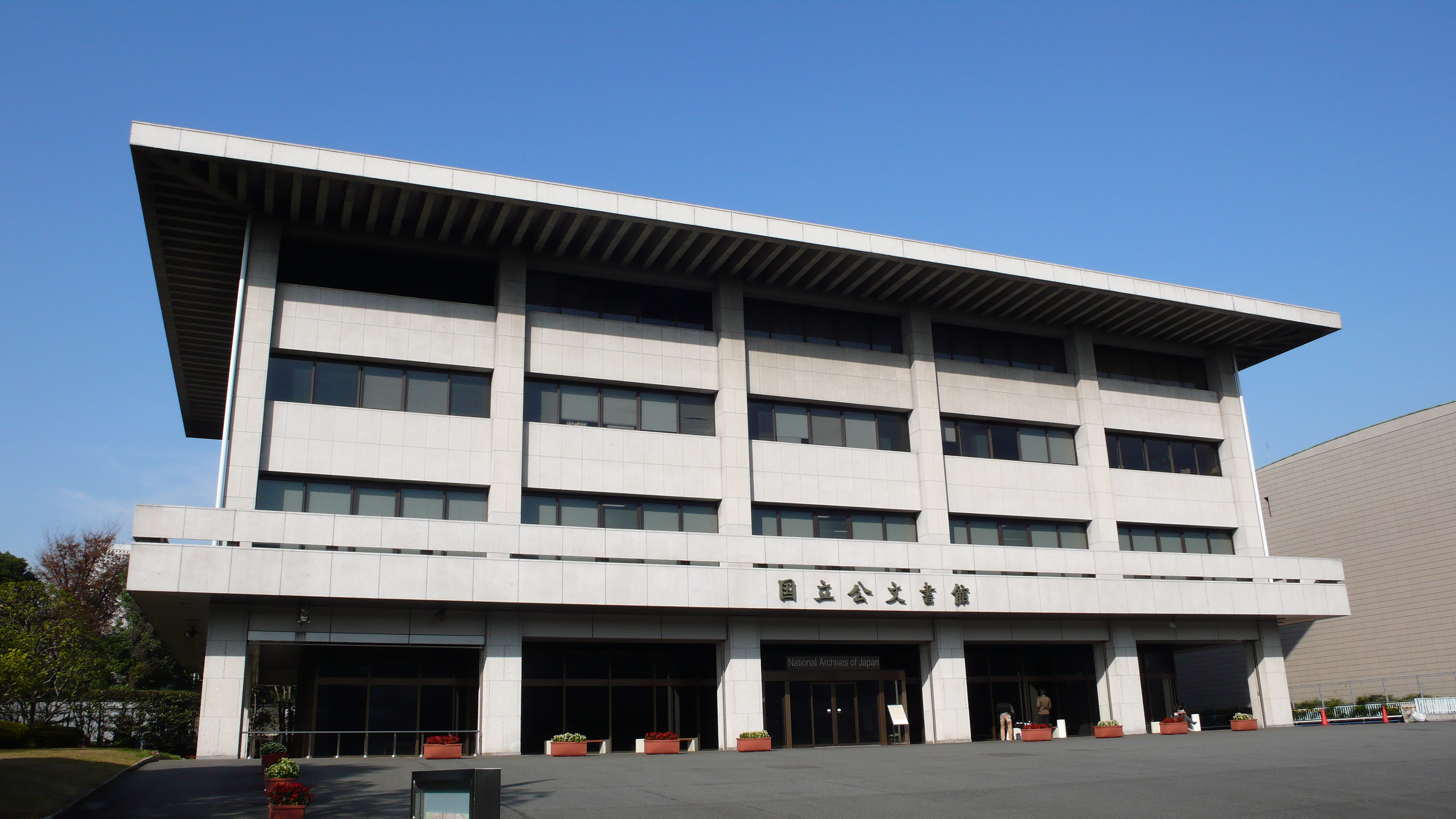
The National Archives of Japan, located in the Chiyoda ward in central Tokyo.

The Independent Administrative Institution National Archives of Japan (独立行政法人国立公文書館, Dokuritsu Gyosei Hojin Kokuritsu Kōbunshokan) preserve Japanese government documents and historical records and make them available to the public. Although Japan's reverence for its unique history and art is well documented and illustrated by collections of art and documents, there is almost no archivist tradition. Before the creation of the National Archives, there was a scarcity of available public documents which preserve "grey-area" records, such as internal sources to show a process which informs the formation of a specific policy or the proceedings of various committee meetings.

In accordance with the National Archives Law No.79 (1999), the core function of preserving "government documents and records of importance as historical materials" includes all material relating to (1) decision-making on important items of national policies, and (2) processes of deliberation, discussion, or consultation prior to reaching any decision-making, and the process of enforcing policies based on decisions made. The transfer of what are deemed historically important materials from the various ministries and agencies is carried out on a regular basis in accordance with the Transfer Plan prepared and revised by the Prime Minister for each fiscal year. Preservation, restoration cataloging, microfilming and digitization are all important aspects of the archive's responsibilities. However, the National Archives is in the process of becoming something more than simply a historical repository, because it is also a complex of structures, processes, and epistemologies which are situated at a critical point of the intersection between scholarship, cultural practices, politics, and technologies.

== History ==
Since the Meiji Period (1868–1912), administrative documents had been preserved respectively by each government ministry. A library for the cabinet of the early Meiji government was established in 1873; and in 1885, this became the Cabinet Library (Naikaku Bunko), which evolved as the nation's leading specialized library of ancient Japanese and Chinese classical books and materials. The Cabinet Library's collection included government records of the Edo period and the Tokugawa shogunate (1603–1867) and other material. These collections are an important element of the archive's core holdings.

In November 1959, the President of the Science Council of Japan issued a recommendation establishing a National Archives to prevent scattering and loss of official documents and to facilitate public access. In July 1971, the newly created Archives began receiving, assessing, and cataloging government documents and records of importance as historical materials; and also, the Archives focused on the conceptually distinct program designed to encourage wider interest by mounting exhibitions and fostering research.

In July 1998, the Tsukuba Annex (Tsukuba Gakuen Toshiwas) was established in Ibaraki Prefecture in order to expand and improve the storage of archival materials.

A Cabinet resolution in 1999 led to the creation of the Japan Center for Asian Historical Records (アジア歴史資料センター, Asia Rekishi Shiryo Centre), which opened in November 2001. The center digitizes data from various national institutions, such as the National Archives, Diplomatic Record Office of the Ministry of Foreign Affairs, and the Military Archives of the National Institute for Defense Studies of the Japan Defense Agency, and provides the digital data through the Internet.

=== Independent Administrative Institution ===
The National Archives became an Independent Administrative Institution on April 1, 2001, when an Act amending part of the National Archives Law came into effect. Archival responsibilities include managing public access to stored records, and overseeing the collection as it grows and develops and preservation protocols.

The enhanced independence of the archives was designed to help further its institutional focus on measures for the proper conservation of historical materials.

== On-line access ==
The National Archives website provides information about the archives and catalog data which allow the holdings to be searched online. The site offers English and Japanese versions; the holdings themselves are, of course, mainly in Japanese. The website facilitates access to brief descriptions and some images of documents, books, and cultural properties. The Digital Gallery may be searched using keywords or various categories, opening access to digitised images of scrolls; maps; photographs; drawings; posters; and documents. English summaries of publications from the National Archives (journal and annual report) are available for downloading from the site.

From April 2005, the digital archive system in this website has provided high-resolution pictures of a range of holdings, including the materials designated as Important Cultural Properties of Japan. The collections in the National Archives provide tangible evidence of memory for individuals, communities, and the state; and the archives are integral in a process of defining memory institutionally within Japan's prevailing political systems and cultural norms.

The National Archives has evolved as a model for developing prefectural and municipal archival collections—some of which predate the establishment of the national institution. In these smaller institutions, similar activities of preservation, restoration, cataloging, microfilming and digitization are evolving. For example, the Digital Gallery includes digitized photos of the stack room for official documents in Shiga Prefecture in 1924. These images were appended to a report submitted by the prefectural governor to the chief of the cabinet secretariat in November of that year. Shiga's governor was describing the progress of work intended to modernize standards and procedures for compiling and storing of written records, which was expected to produce improved efficiencies in administrative services.

== See also ==
- List of national archives
- National Diet Library
