= Kawanishi N1K =

Japanese floatplane/land-based fighter

N1K/N1K-J
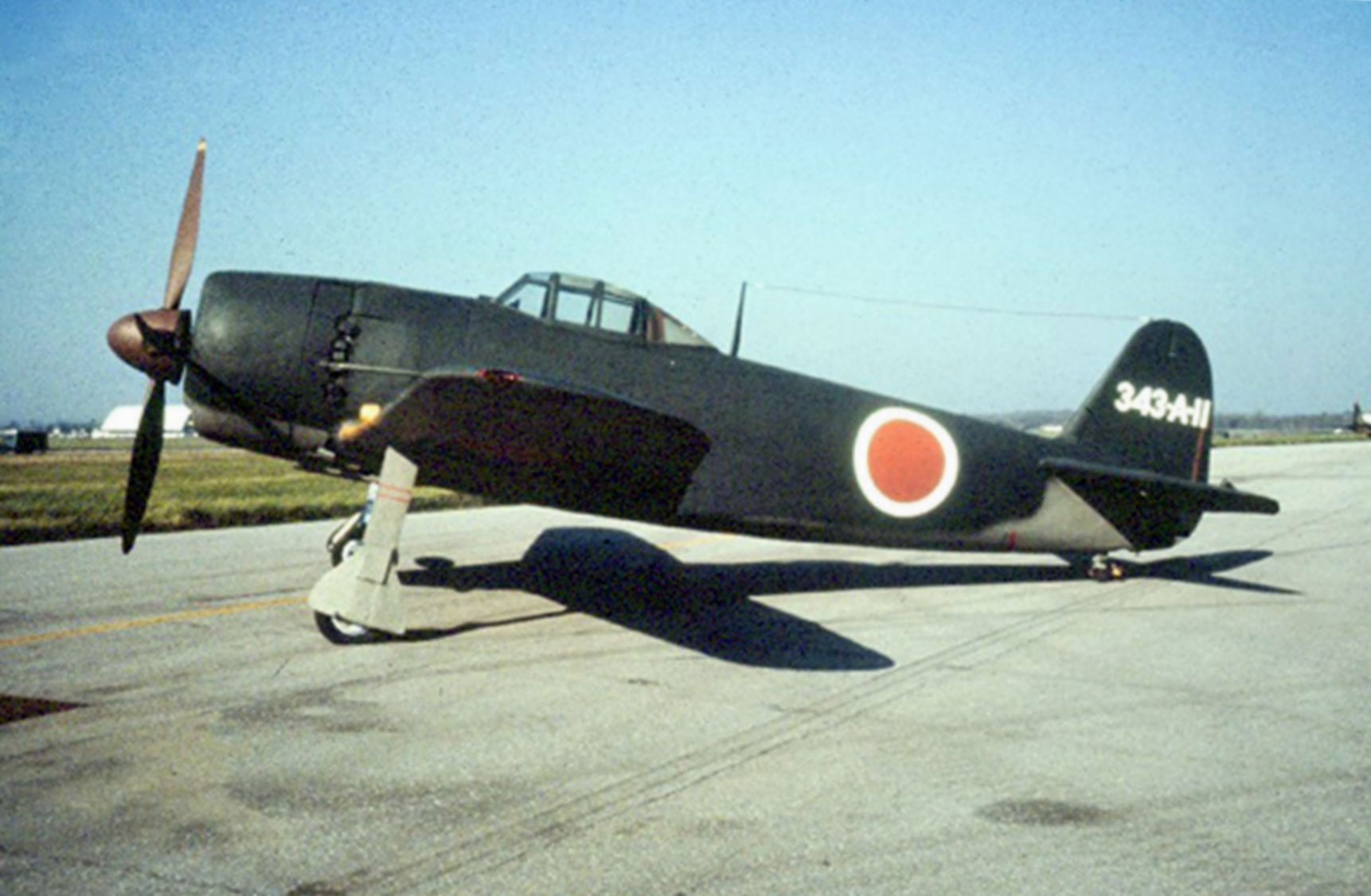
- Kawanishi N1K2-J Shiden Kai

General information
- Type: Fighter
- National origin: Japan
- Manufacturer: Kawanishi Aircraft Company
- Primary user: Imperial Japanese Navy Air Service
- Number built: 1,532

History
- Introduction date: 1943
- First flight: N1K1: 6 May 1942; N1K1-J: 27 December 1942; N1K2-J: 31 December 1943
- Retired: 1945

The Kawanishi N1K was a fighter aircraft designed and produced by the Japanese aircraft manufacturer Kawanishi Aircraft Company. Operated by the Imperial Japanese Navy (IJN), there were two distinct variants; the N1K Kyōfū (強風, Strong Wind) (Allied reporting name Rex) floatplane and the land-based N1K-J Shiden (紫電, Violet Lightning) (reporting name George).

The N1K was initially developed during the early 1940s as a floatplane designed to support forward offensive operations without reliance on airstrips. Initially designated K-20, Kawanishi opted to incorporate several advanced features derived from its E15K Shiun reconnaissance floatplane, such as a laminar flow airfoil and Contra-rotating propellers. Performing its maiden flight on 6 May 1942 and adapted to use a conventional propeller due to gearbox issues, it was ordered as the Naval Fighter Seaplane Kyofu Model 11, and first delivered to the IJN in early 1943. However, due to Japan's declining position in the Pacific War, an offensive floatplane was viewed as less urgently required than defensive fighters. Accordingly, the aircraft was reworked into a land-based configuration, which comprised the addition of landing gear, simplification for ease of production, and the installation of the Nakajima NK9A Homare 11 radial engine.

The N1K1-J Shiden entered service in early 1944 and would see action over the skies of Formosa (Taiwan), the Philippines, and, Okinawa. Both contemporary pilots and Allied reports praised the N1K-J’s performance, noting its high speed and maneuverability compared with other Japanese fighters of the period. The improved N1K2-J Shiden Kai (紫電改) made its first flight on 1 January 1944. It carried four 20 mm cannons and was provisioned with an automatic flap-extension mechanism, operated by a mercury-tilt sensor, to enhance lift during tight turns. These automatically deploying flaps increased wing lift during high-G maneuvers, allowing a tighter turn radius without additional pilot input. Unlike the Mitsubishi A6M Zero, the Shiden Kai could viably engage late-war Allied fighters such as the F6F Hellcat, F4U Corsair, and P-51 Mustang on equal terms.

== Design and development ==
=== Origins as a floatplane ===
Development of the N1K can be traced back to 1940 and the issuing of an instruction to the Kawanishi Aircraft Company to commence work on the design of a dedicated floatplane fighter capable of supporting forward offensive operations where no airstrips were available. In September 1940, the accompanying 15-Shi specification was issued by the Imperial Japanese Navy (IJN), upon receipt of which, Kawanishi's engineering office began planning for the new floatplane. It was decided to draw upon the technologies that had been developed for another aircraft, the Kawanishi E15K Shiun, during the design process; specifically, the incorporation of a laminar flow airfoil section to reduce drag. Early on, the floatplane was designated K-20 under a recently-established Service Aeroplane Development Programme.

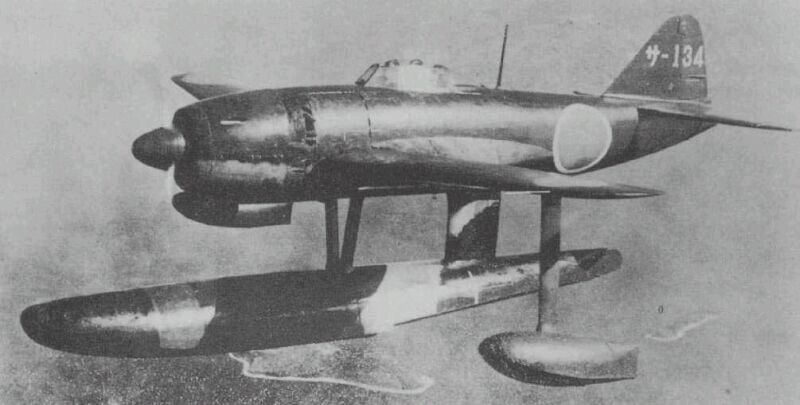
Kawanishi N1K1 Kyōfū floatplane fighter photographed by the Japanese Navy prior to 1945

In terms of its general configuration, the K20 was a relatively compact floatplane with mid-mounted wings. The central float was attached to the fuselage via a forward V-strut and a rearward I-strut; the stabilizing floats, which comprised a metal planing lower section and inflatable fabric upper section, were designed to retract into the wing during flight and inflate when extended, akin to the E15K. It was powered by a 1,460 hp (1,090 kW) Mitsubishi MK4D Kasei 14 14-cylinder radial engine, which drove a pair of contra-rotating twin-bladed propellers, an arrangement that offset propeller torque during take-off.

On 6 May 1942, the prototype N1K1 performed its maiden flight; it would be followed by a further seven aircraft by the end of the service trials process. The gearbox for the contra-rotating propeller proved to be troublesome during flight testing and led both the engine and the propeller being swapped to the Mitsubishi MK4C Kasei 13 and a conventional three-bladed propeller that was driven via an extension shaft. This configuration was more reliable, but also proved to be a challenge during take-off runs due to the pilot needing to actively counteract the powerful torque of the engine. In August 1942, the IJN took deliver of several service trials aircraft. It was determined to possess favourable handling once in the air; furthermore, its use of combat flaps gave it a high level of manoeuvrability that was roughly comparable to that of the famed Mitsubishi A6M Zero. However, its maximum speed was 489 km/h (304 mph) and thus fell short of the IJN's specified requirement of 310 kn (574 km/h; 357 mph) requirement.

Following the completion of the flight trial programme, the IJN ordered the type into quantity production as the Naval Fighter Seaplane Kyofu Model 11, and production aircraft were first delivered to the service in early 1943. However, by this point, the wider military circumstances had changed substantially: Japan's performance in the Pacific War had led to the nation being firmly on the defensive, and thus there was no longer a need for a fighter to fulfill the offensive role. The IJN's requirements for this fighter were nearly impossible to achieve for a float plane, and the expected protracted development period led the Nakajima Aircraft Company to develop an interim floatplane fighter based on the A6M Zero, the Nakajima A6M2-N. Ultimately, the Kyofu only saw limited service, being mostly based in Southeast Asia. A number were flown out of Ambon and the Aru Islands in the Moluccas, while some were stationed at Penang Island, off the Malayan peninsula. They were also used in the Battle of Okinawa. Towards the end of the conflict, the Kyōfū were also used in the homeland defense role, operating from Lake Biwa by the Sasebo Air Corps and the Ōtsu Air Corps.

=== Land-based version ===
The requirement to carry a bulky, heavy float essentially crippled the N1K against contemporary American fighters. However, in late 1941, Kawanishi designers had proposed that the N1K could serve as a basis for a fighter variant, having projected that it was capable of sufficient performance in this capacity. A land-based version was produced as a private venture. Initially, the only major modification planned was the substitution of the ventral and outrigger floats for fully-retractable landing gear; however, the design team also opted to adopt the newly-developed Nakajima NK9A Homare 11 18-cylinder radial engine to replace the less powerful MK4C Kasei 13 of the N1K-1 along with a new four-bladed propeller.

As the aircraft retained the mid-mounted wing of the floatplane, in combination with a relatively large propeller, it necessitated the use of relatively lengthy main landing gear that contracted while being retracted into the wing wells. A uncommon feature was the aircraft's combat flaps that automatically adjusted in response to acceleration, freeing up the pilot's concentration, and reducing the chance of stalling in combat. However, the N1K did have temperamental flight characteristics that required an experienced touch at the controls.

The prototype of this version flew for the first time on 27 December 1942. Several issues were apparent during the flight test programme. The Nakajima Homare engine proved to be powerful, but had been rushed into production before it was sufficiently developed, and thus was troublesome. Another problem was landing gear failure, which was attributed to poor heat treatment of the wheels. Apart from engine problems and the landing gear, the flight test program showed that the aircraft was promising. Prototypes were evaluated by the IJN, and since the aircraft was faster than the Zero and had a much longer range than the Mitsubishi J2M Raiden, it was ordered into production as the N1K1-J, the -J indicating a land-based fighter modification of the original floatplane fighter.

Only four days after the Shiden's first test flight, a complete redesign began. The N1K2-J addressed the N1K1-J's major defects, primarily the mid-mounted wing and long landing gear. The wings were moved to a low position, which permitted the use of a shorter, conventional undercarriage. Further changes included a lengthened fuselage and a redesigned tail. The production of the entire aircraft was simplified: over a third of the parts used in the previous Shiden could still be used in its successor, while construction used fewer critical materials. The N1K2-J was approximately 250 kg (550 lb) lighter, while faster and more reliable than its predecessor. The Homare engine was retained, even though reliability problems persisted, as no alternative was available. A prototype of the new version flew on 1 January 1944. After completing IJN trials in April, the N1K2-J was rushed into production. This variant was named the "Shiden Kai" (紫電改)" with Kai meaning modified.

== Operational history ==
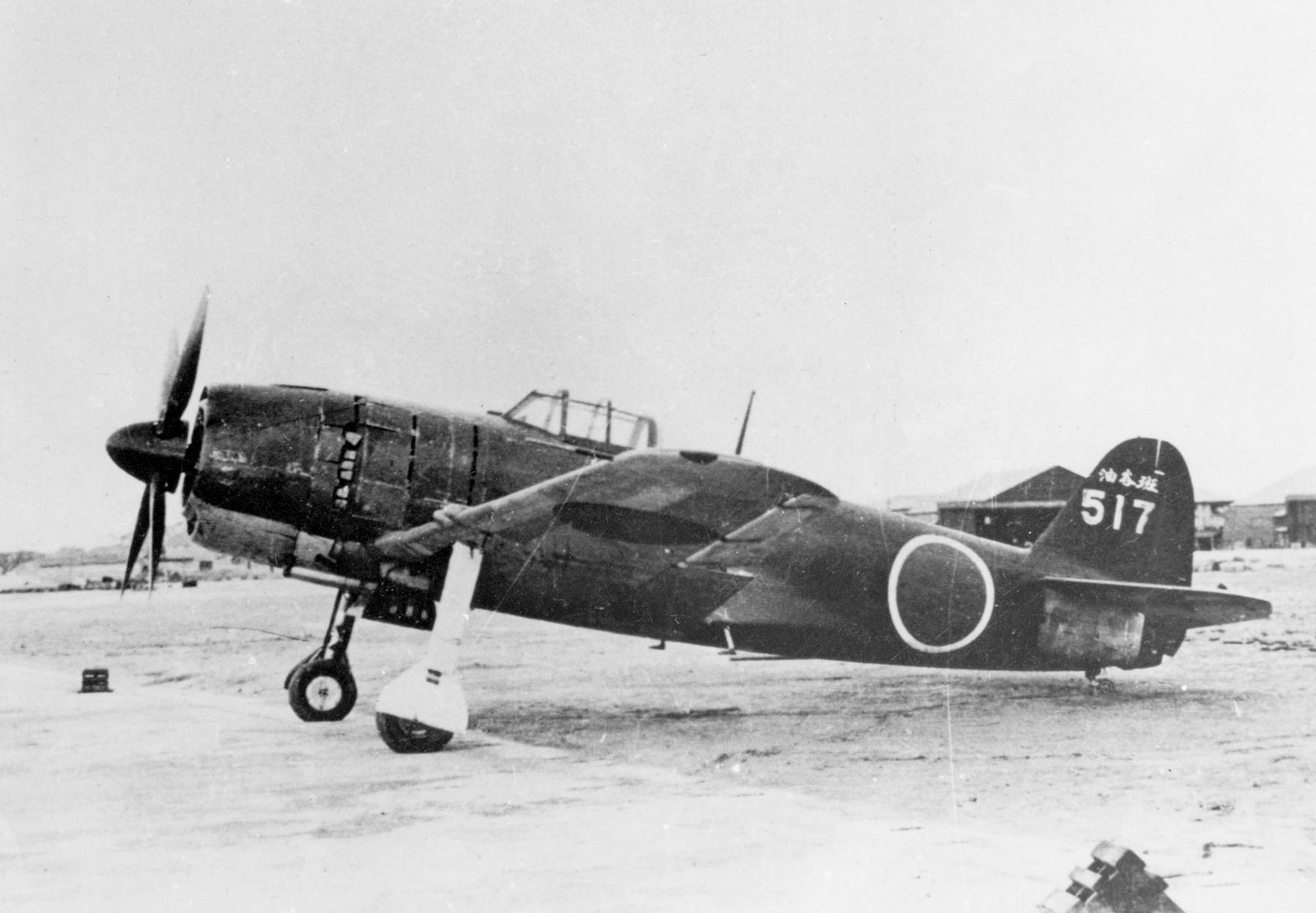
Kawanishi N1K2-J, probably N1K4-J Shiden Kai Model 32. Only two prototypes were built.

The N1K1-J Shiden entered service in early 1944. The N1K1-J and the N1K2 Shiden Kai released later that year were among the rare Japanese aircraft that offered pilots an even chance against late-war American designs, such as the F6F Hellcat and the F4U Corsair, and could be a capable weapon in the hands of an ace. In February 1945, Ensign Kaneyoshi Muto, flying an N1K2-J as part of a mixed formation of at least ten Japanese aircraft, faced seven U.S. Navy Hellcat pilots from squadron VF-82 in the sky over Japan; the formation shot down four Hellcats with no loss to themselves. After the action, Japanese propagandists fabricated a story in which Muto was the sole airman facing twelve enemy aircraft. (A leading Japanese ace, Saburō Sakai, later asserted in his autobiography that Muto had done this feat at an earlier stage of the war – albeit at the controls of a Zero fighter.)

The N1K1-J aircraft were used very effectively over Formosa (Taiwan), the Philippines, and, later, Okinawa. Before production was switched to the improved N1K2-J, 1,007 aircraft, including the prototypes, were produced. Because of production difficulties and damage done by B-29 raids on factories, only 415 of the superior N1K2-J fighters were produced.

The N1K2-J Shiden Kai proved to be a superior dogfighting aircraft to the earlier IJN fighters, but still slower than allied types and less rugged. Having adequate speed (faster than the Zero but slower than the Hellcat), the Shiden Kai offered pilots an agile aircraft with a roll rate of 82°/sec at 386 km/h (240 mph), and carried four 20 mm cannons in the wings. As a bomber interceptor, the N1K2-J fared less well, hampered by a poor rate of climb and reduced engine performance at high altitude.

=== 343 Kōkūtai ===
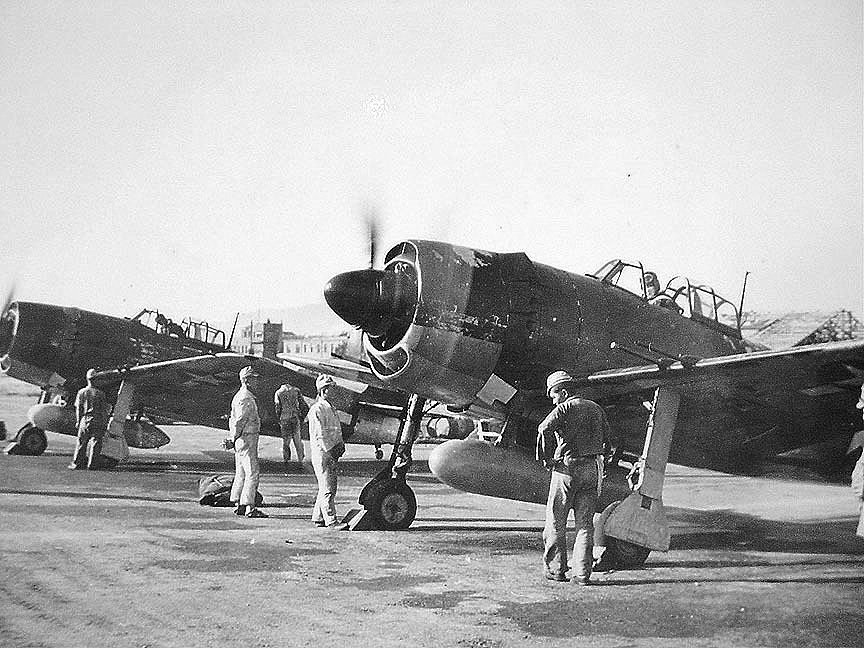
Captured Kawanishi N1K2-Js having their Homare engines run up by former IJNAS groundcrew.

The N1K2-J Shiden Kai was an advanced fighter offered in limited quantities. As a result, the planes were distributed to elite naval fighter units such as 343 Kōkūtai ("343rd Naval Air Group"), constituted on 25 December 1944 and commanded by Minoru Genda. This unit was highly successful for its very brief history.

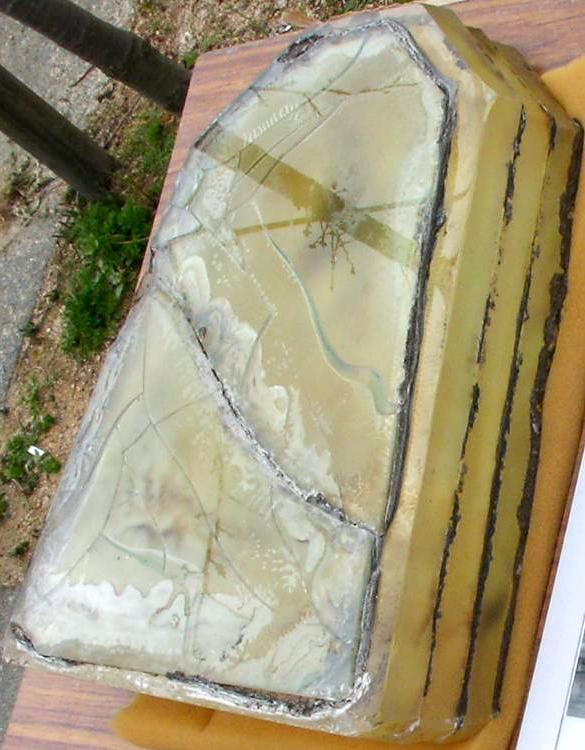
The Shiden's bulletproof glass.

== Variants ==
N1K1 Kyōfū

- N1K1 Kyōfū

Standard type as floatplane, which was used from early 1943, with Mitsubishi MK4C Kasei 13 engine.

- N1K2 Kyōfū Kai

Reserved name for an intended model with larger engine, not built.

N1K1-J Shiden

- N1K1-J Prototypes

development of fighter hydroplane N1K1 Kyōfū, with 1,820 hp Homare 11 engine.

- N1K1-J Shiden Model 11

Navy Land Based Interceptor, first production model with 1,990 hp Homare 21 engine and revised cover, armed with two 7.7 mm Type 97 machine guns and two 20 mm Type 99 cannons. Modified total-vision cockpit.

- N1K1-Ja Shiden Model 11A

without frontal 7.7 mm Type 97s, with only four 20 mm Type 99s in wings.

- N1K1-Jb Shiden Model 11B

similar to Model 11A but capable of carrying two 250 kg bombs, with revised wing weapons mounts.

- N1K1-Jc Shiden Model 11C

definitive fighter-bomber version, derived from Model 11B. Four bomb racks under wings.

- N1K1-J Kai a

Experimental version with auxiliary rocket. One Model 11 conversion.

- N1K1-J Kai b

Conversion for dive bombing. One 250 kg bomb under belly and six rockets under wings.

N1K2-J Shiden-Kai

- N1K2-J Prototypes

N1K1-Jb redesigned. Low wings, engine cover and landing gear modified. New fuselage and tail, 8 built.

- N1K2-J Shiden Kai Model 21

Navy Land Based Interceptor, first model of series with a Nakajima Homare 21 engine.

- N1K2-Ja Shiden Kai Model 21A

Fighter Interceptor version: 2,000 hp Homare 21-18 engine with a low wing and larger prop design with four 250 kg ground bombs. Fixed problem with teething pains of N1K2 J at high altitude.

- N1K2-K Shiden Kai Rensen 1, Model A

Fighter Trainer, modified from N1K-J Series with two seats, operative or factory conversions.

Further variants

- N1K3-J Shiden Kai 1, Model 31

Prototypes: Engines displaced to ahead, two 13.2 mm Type 3 machine guns in front, 2 built.

- N1K3-A Shiden Kai 2, Model 41

Prototypes: Carrier-based version of N1K3-J, 2 built.

- N1K4-J Shiden Kai 3, Model 32

Prototypes: 2,000 hp Homare 23 engine, 2 built.

- N1K4-A Shiden Kai 4, Model 42

Prototype: Experimental conversion of N1K4-J example with equipment for use in carriers, 1 built.

- N1K5-J Shiden Kai 5, Model 25

High-Altitude Interceptor version with Mitsubishi HA-43 (MK9A) with 2,200 takeoff hp, project only.

=== Production ===
N1K1 Production: Kawanishi Kokuki K.K.
Year
Year	Jan.	Feb.	Mar.	Apr.	May	June	July	Aug.	Sept.	Oct.	Nov.	Dec.	Annual
1942								1	0	1	0	1	3
1943	2	1	0	1	0	0	5	8	9	11	13	15	65
1944	9	10	10										29
Total													97

- First prototype completed in April 1942, and made its maiden flight on 6 May 1942.
- Pre-production started with eight prototypes and service trials aircraft completed from August 1942 to December 1942, and with a further five, in the following year.

N1K1-J Production: Kawanishi Kokuki K.K.
Year
Year	Jan.	Feb.	Mar.	Apr.	May	June	July	Aug.	Sept.	Oct.	Nov.	Dec.	Annual
1943							4	6	11	14	16	20	71
1944	17	40	65	93	17	71	90	92	106	100	82	51	824
1945	24	30	30	15	7	6							112
Total													1,007

- Pre-production started with nine prototypes and service trials aircraft completed from July 1943 to Aug. 1943.

N1K2-J Production: Kawanishi Kokuki K.K.
Year
Year	Jan.	Feb.	Mar.	Apr.	May	June	July	Aug.	Sept.	Oct.	Nov.	Dec.	Annual
1943												1	1
1944	1	1	1	2	1	1	3	2	1	6	7	31	67
1945	35	47	58	80	81	20	12	5					338
Total													406

- Pre-production started with eight prototypes and service trials aircraft completed from Dec. 1943 to May. 1944.

Total Production:
According to USSBS Report: 1,509	Figure includes: 97 N1K1, 1,007 N1K1-J and 406 N1K2-J builds.
According to Francillon: 1,532	Figure includes: 97 N1K1, 1,007 N1K1-J and 423 N1K2-J + K builds, with 2 N1K3-J, 2 N1K4-J, 1 N1K4-A prototypes.

== Operators ==
Japan

- Imperial Japanese Navy Air Service

== Surviving aircraft ==
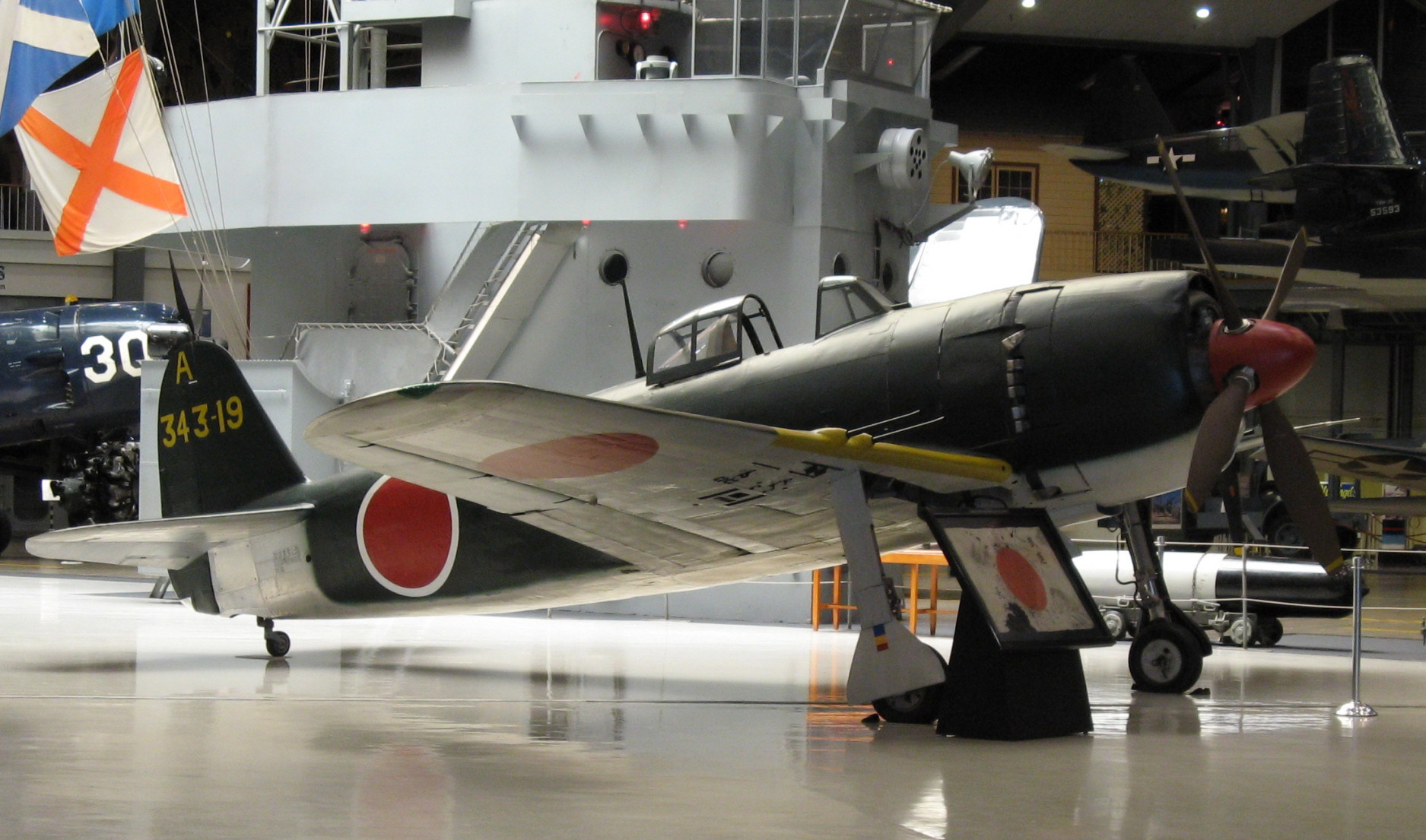
N1K2-J on display at the National Naval Aviation Museum

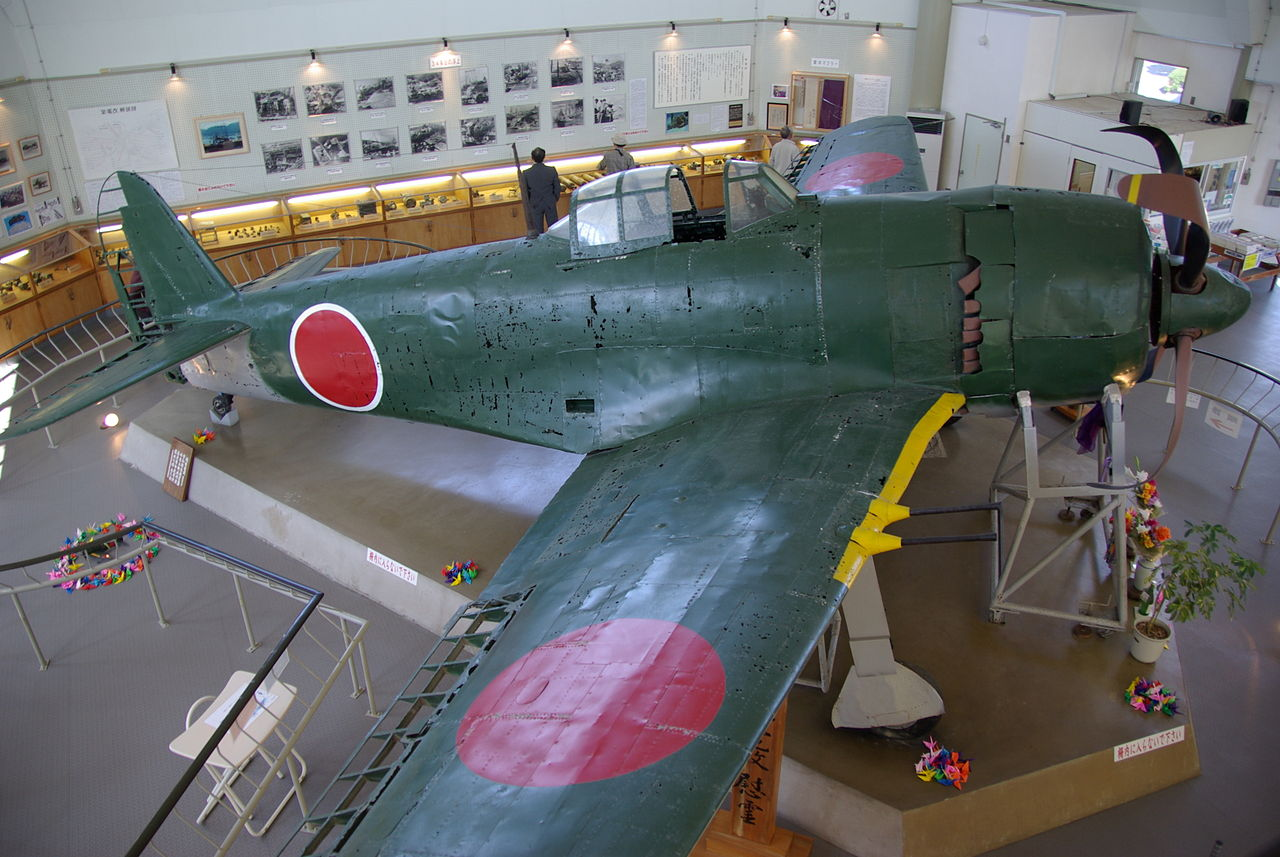
The 343 Kōkūtai's Shiden-Kai, discovered on 18 November 1978, in Jyoen Hisayoshi Bay. The aircraft is displayed at Nanreku Misho Koen, Ehime Prefecture, Japan. It is possible that it is the one was flown by ace-pilot Kaneyoshi Muto.

Four of the five surviving Shiden-Kai aircraft are now displayed in American and Japanese museums, while all three surviving Kyofu aircraft are displayed/stored in American museums. One Shiden-Kai replica is currently on display in Japan.

One N1K2-J (s/n 5128, tail code A343-19) is at the National Naval Aviation Museum at Naval Air Station Pensacola, Florida.

The second N1K2-Ja (s/n 5312), a fighter-bomber variant equipped with wing mounts to carry bombs, is on display in the Air Power gallery at the National Museum of the United States Air Force near Dayton, Ohio. This aircraft was displayed outside for many years in a children's playground in San Diego, suffering considerable corrosion, and had become seriously deteriorated. In 1959, it was donated to the Museum through the cooperation of the San Diego Squadron of the Air Force Association.

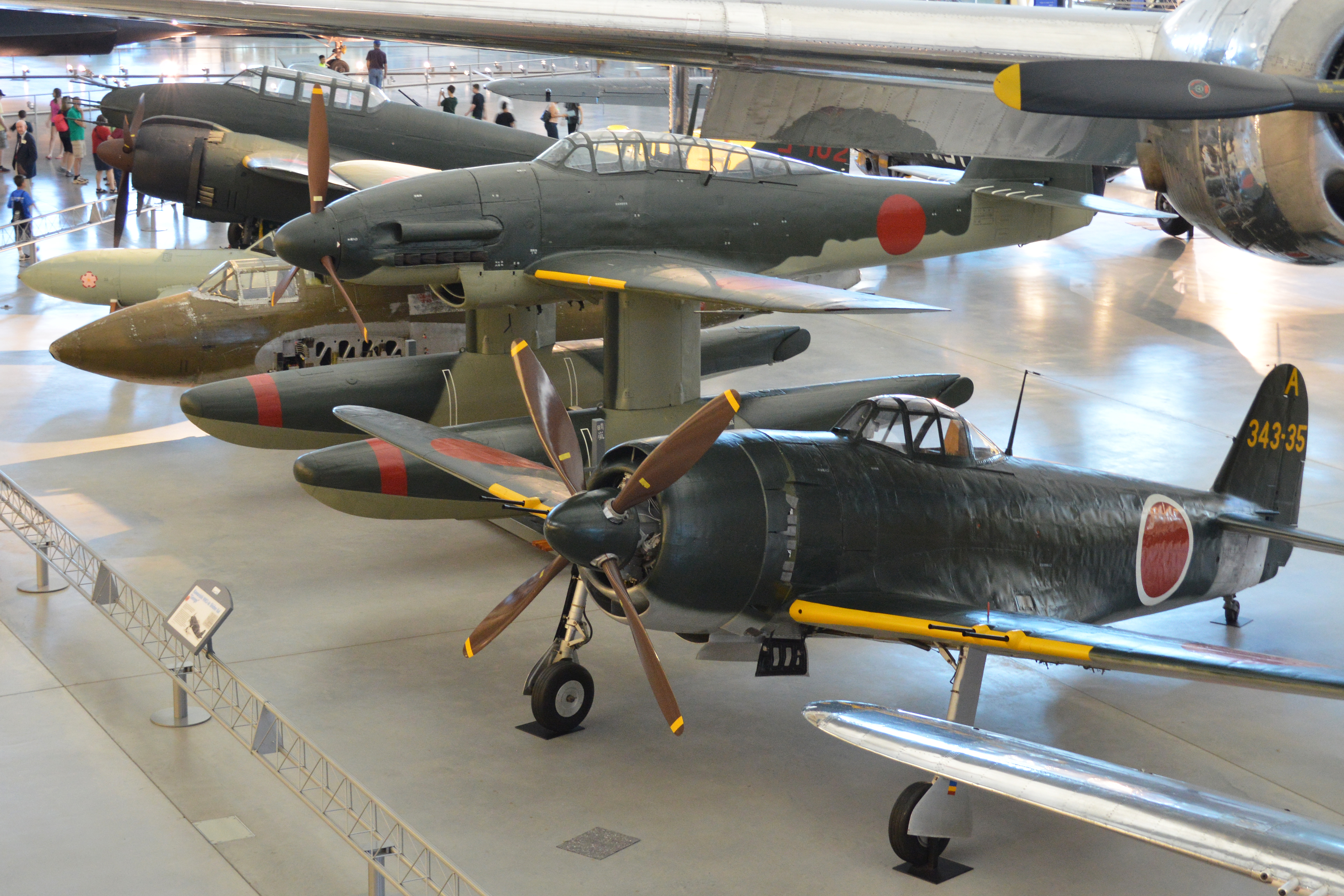
N1K2-J A343-35 on display at the Steven F. Udvar-Hazy Center, positioned alongside the museum's other Japanese military aircraft

The third example (s/n 5341, tail code A343-35) is owned by the National Air and Space Museum but was restored by the Champlin Fighter Museum at Falcon Field, Mesa, Arizona, in return for the right to display the aircraft at Falcon Field for 10 years after restoration. It currently is on display at the National Air and Space Museum's Steven F. Udvar-Hazy Center in Chantilly, Virginia.

The fourth authentic Shiden-Kai is displayed in a local museum at Nanreku Misho Koen in Ehime Prefecture, Shikoku, Japan. This aircraft is known to be from the 343rd Kōkūtai, as the unit flew sorties in the area, but the tail code is unknown as it was partially restored from a corroded wreck recovered from the sea. After an aerial battle on 24 July 1945, its pilot ditched the aircraft in the waters of the Bungo Channel, but he was never found; by the time of the aircraft's recovery from the seabed on 14 July 1979, he could be identified only as one of six pilots from the 343rd squadron who disappeared that day. Photographs of the six—including Takashi Oshibuchi, commander of the 701 Hikōtai, and Kaneyoshi Muto—are displayed under the aircraft engine. In 2019, the aircraft was restored to non-flying condition.

On 8 April 2026, a Shiden-Kai was salvaged from the sea 200–300 meters off the coast of Akune City, Kagoshima Prefecture, Japan. The aircraft was piloted by Hayashi Yoshishige (jp) and was shot down on 21 April 1945. The engine, propeller, front fuselage, and both wings complete with their cannons was recovered, while the rear portion of fuselage remains missing. It will undergo desalination work before being put on display as a memorial to the importance of peace.

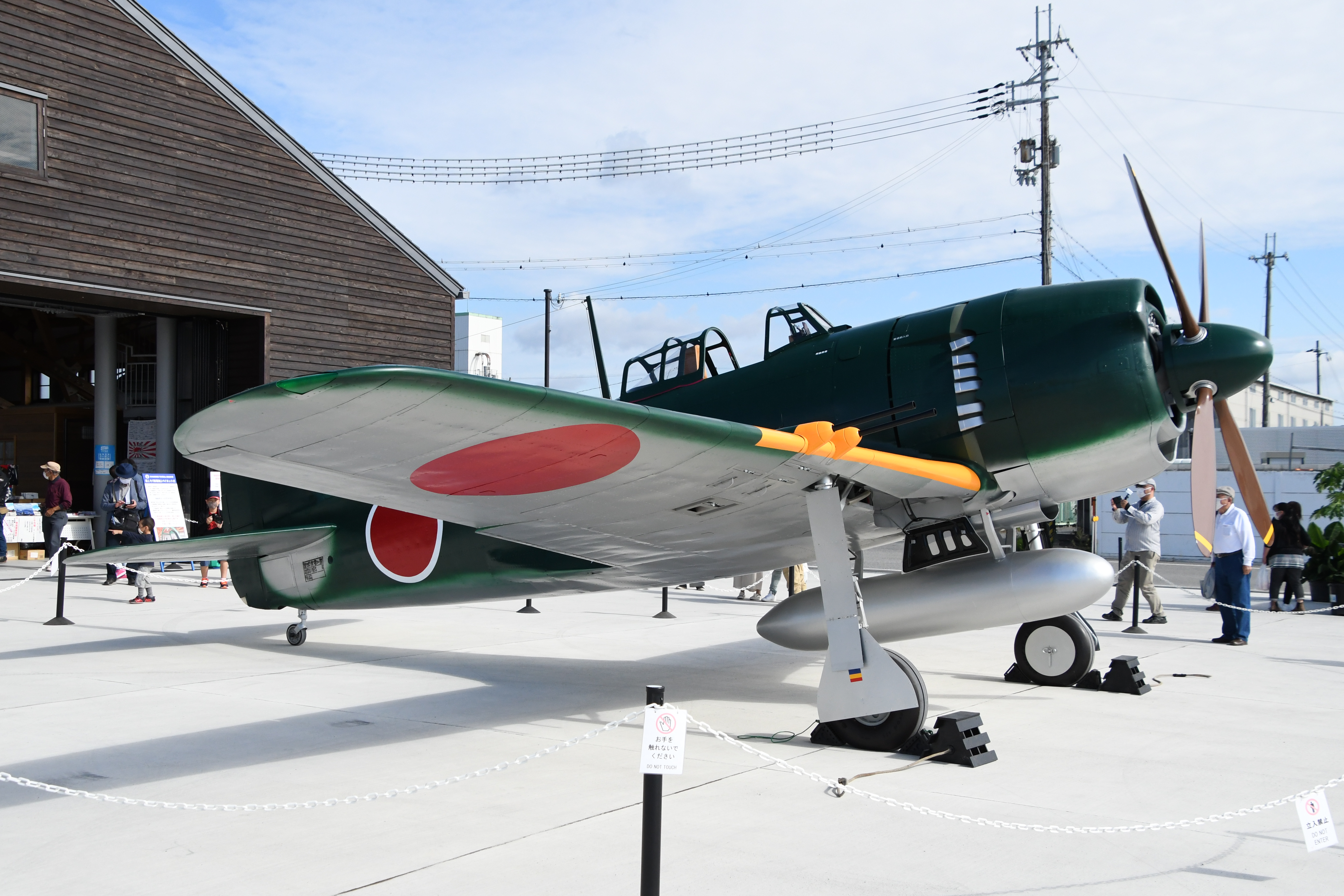
The N1K2-Ja replica on display in 2020.

A full-scale replica of a Shiden-Kai is on display at the former Uzurano Airbase in Kasai, Hyōgo Prefecture, where the aircraft is exhibited both indoors and outdoors.

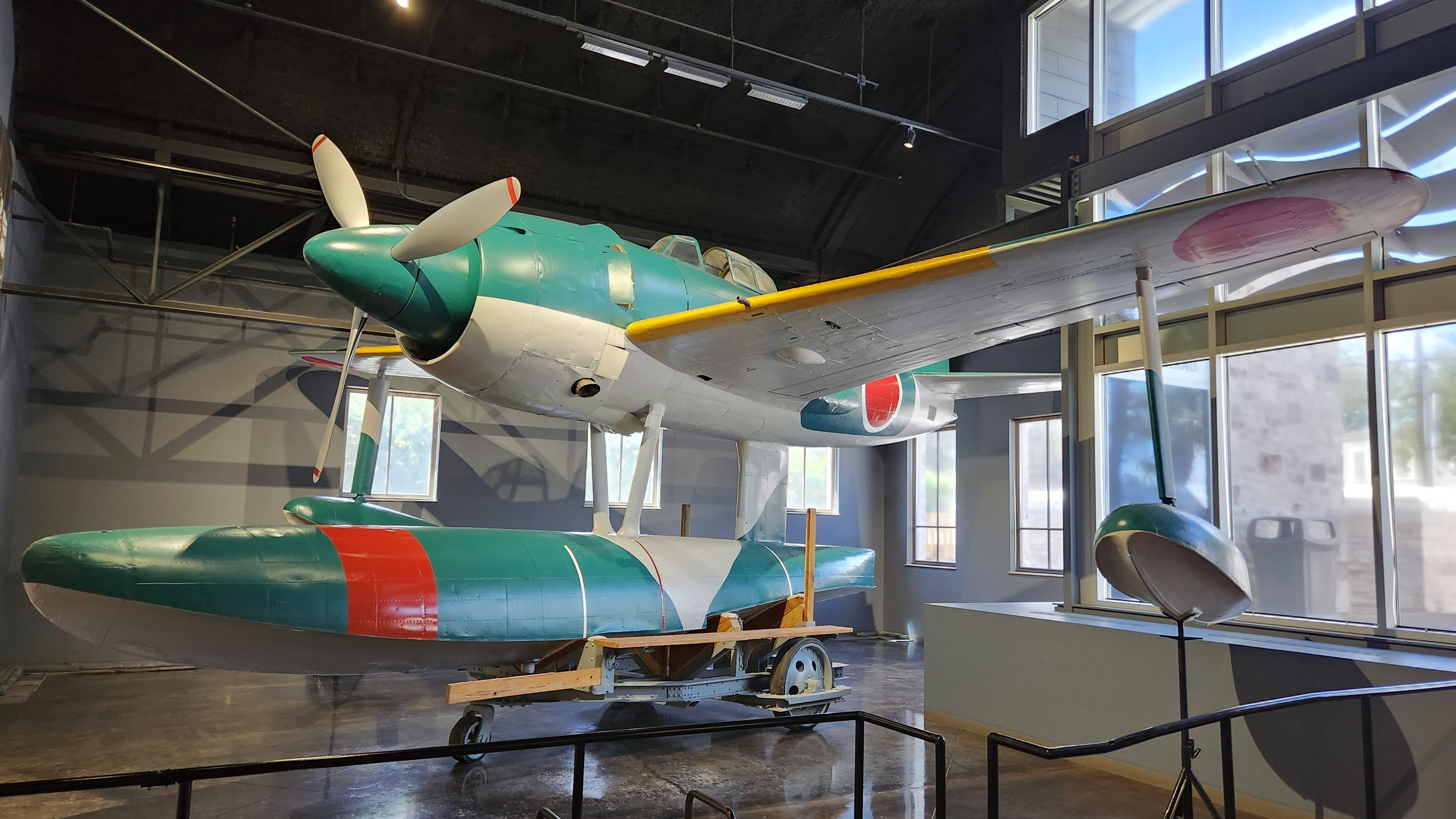
N1K1 Kyōfū (s/n 562) at the National Museum of the Pacific War.

N1K1 Kyōfū (s/n 514) is in storage at the National Air and Space Museum's Paul E. Garber Preservation, Restoration, and Storage Facility in Suitland, Maryland.

N1K1 Kyōfū (s/n 562) is located on display at the National Museum of the Pacific War in Fredricksburg, Texas.

N1K1 Kyōfū (s/n 565), formerly displayed at Naval Air Station Joint Reserve Base Willow Grove, Horsham Township, Montgomery County, Pennsylvania, stored at the National Naval Aviation Museum in Pensacola, Florida. Now being restored by American Aero Services, New Smyrna Beach, Florida, for the American Heritage Museum in Stow, Massachusetts.

== Specifications (N1K1-J) ==
Data from Japanese aircraft of the Pacific War, TAIC 107 A1 Report : Kawanishi N1K1-J

General characteristics

- Crew: 1
- Length: 8.885 m (29 ft 2 in)
- Wingspan: 12 m (39 ft 4 in)
- Height: 4.06 m (13 ft 4 in)
- Wing area: 23.5 m^{2} (253 sq ft)
- Airfoil: LB620515-6075
- Empty weight: 2,897 kg (6,387 lb)
- Gross weight: 3,900 kg (8,598 lb)
- Max takeoff weight: 4,321 kg (9,526 lb)
- Fuel capacity: 477 L (126 US gal; 105 imp gal) internal + 323 L (85 US gal; 71 imp gal) drop tank; maximum 800 L (210 US gal; 180 imp gal)
- Powerplant: 1 × Nakajima NK9H Homare 21 18-cylinder air-cooled radial piston engine, 1,473 kW (1,975 hp) at sea level
- Propellers: 4-bladed, 2.987 m (9 ft 9.6 in) diameter constant-speed propeller

Performance

- Maximum speed: 571 km/h (355 mph, 308 kn) at 3,500 kg (7,717 lb) at sea level

- 656 km/h (408 mph) at 6,100 m (20,000 ft)

- Range: 1,078 km (670 mi, 582 nmi) at 272 km/h (169 mph) at 460 m (1,500 ft)

- 813 km (505 mi) at 75% V_{max}at 391 km/h (243 mph) at 460 m (1,500 ft)

- Ferry range: 1,746 km (1,085 mi, 943 nmi) maximum with drop tank at 269 km/h (167 mph) at 460 m (1,500 ft)

- 1,078 km (670 mi) at 75% V_{max} at 381.5 km/h (237.1 mph) at 460 m (1,500 ft)

- Service ceiling: 12,009 m (39,400 ft)
- Rate of climb: 19.7 m/s (3,880 ft/min) at 3,500 kg (7,717 lb) at sea level

- 4,065 ft/min at 3,500 kg (7,717 lb) at 1,798 m (5,900 ft)

- Time to altitude: 3,000 m (10,000 ft) in two minutes and 36 seconds

- 6,100 m (20,000 ft) in five minutes and 36 seconds

- Wing loading: 166 kg/m^{2} (34 lb/sq ft)
- Power/mass: 0.38 kW/kg (0.23 hp/lb)

Armament

- Guns:

- 4 × 20 mm (0.79 in) Type 99 Mark 2 machine guns in the wings.

- Bombs:

- 2 × 250 kg (550 lb) bombs

or

- 1 × 323 L (85 US gal; 71 imp gal) drop tank

== See also ==
Aircraft of comparable role, configuration, and era

- Focke-Wulf Fw 190D
- Grumman F6F Hellcat
- Grumman F8F Bearcat
- Hawker Tempest
- Kawasaki Ki-100
- Lavochkin La-7
- Mitsubishi J2M Raiden
- Nakajima Ki-84
- Republic P-47 Thunderbolt
- Vought F4U Corsair

Related lists

- List of aircraft of Japan during World War II
- List of aircraft of World War II
- List of fighter aircraft
- List of military aircraft of Japan
