= Tamotsu Ema =

Japanese dive bomber pilot

- 江間 保
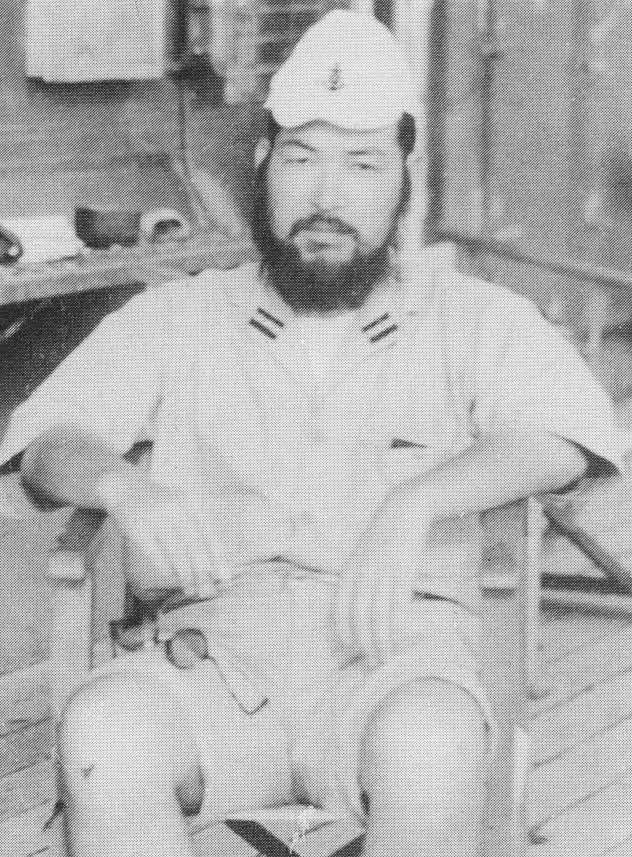
- Ema aboard the Japanese carrier Zuikaku in 1942
- Military career
- Allegiance: Empire of Japan
- Branch: Imperial Japanese Navy Air Service (IJN)
- Units: Akagi; Zuikaku; 582nd Air Group
- Conflicts: World War II: Attack on Pearl Harbor; Indian Ocean Raid; Battle of the Coral Sea; Operation SE; Solomon Islands Campaign

Tamotsu Ema (江間 保, Ema Tamotsu) was a dive bomber pilot in the Imperial Japanese Navy (IJN) during World War II. He led Aichi D3A dive bombers from the carrier Zuikaku during the Battle of the Coral Sea that damaged Yorktown.

== Early career ==
Tamotsu Ema enrolled in the Imperial Japanese Naval Academy in April 1932 and graduated from the 63rd class in March 1936. In April 1937 he was commissioned as ensign. He was eventually selected for the navy pilot training program and specialised in dive bombing. He graduated from the 30th class in July 1938 and was promoted to lieutenant junior grade in November. He served at several land bases around Japan (including Ōmura and Saiki Air Groups on Kyushu) before he was assigned to the carrier Akagi in May 1939. In May 1940 he was appointed as an instructor at the Kasumigaura Air Group and in November he was promoted to lieutenant.

In September 1941, Ema was transferred to the carrier Zuikaku. On 7 December 1941, he participated in the Attack on Pearl Harbor, where he led one of the Zuikaku dive bomber divisions that bombed and strafed American aircraft and hangars on Wheeler Field. In April 1942, he participated in the Indian Ocean Raid, where he led one of the Zuikaku dive bomber divisions that bombed and sank the British carrier Hermes. Shortly after the battle, he became a senior flight division leader (senior Buntaichō) and was given the command of Zuikaku dive bomber squadron.

== Coral Sea ==
In May 1942, Ema participated in Operation MO aboard Zuikaku that resulted in the Battle of the Coral Sea. In the morning on 7 May, he and his squadron were part of the strike against the oiler Neosho and the destroyer Sims (falsely identified as a carrier and a cruiser) that was under the overall command of Lieutenant Commander Kakuichi Takahashi. Unable to find any enemy carriers, Takahashi ordered the dive bombers to attack the oiler and the destroyer. After sinking Sims and fatally crippling Neosho, the strike force headed back to their carriers.

Meanwhile, the actual USN carrier fleet was spotted and Rear Admiral Chūichi Hara planned to launch an afternoon strike as soon as Takahashi's force returned. However, Ema's 16 D3A dive bombers got lost in bad weather and returned late. This meant that the new strike would be forced to land at night upon their return. Hara, therefore, selected only veteran aircrews for this strike, including Ema and five of his pilots. The strike was ill-fated as it missed the USN carriers due to poor weather, and in return lost eight Nakajima B5N torpedo bombers and one D3A to radar-guided interception force of Grumman F4F Wildcat fighters led by Lieutenant Commanders Paul Ramsey and James Flatley. The strike force then flew to the end of their search leg and found nothing; thus they jettisoned the bombs and torpedoes and headed back. On the way back, they encountered the USN carriers and mistook them for their own. Several pilots tried to land on them; including Ema, who broke off only at the last moment. He barely made it back to Zuikaku since his malfunctioning radio could not pick up the homing signal the IJN carriers.

The next morning on 8 May, the two carrier fleets sighted each other. Takahashi led a strike force of 33 Aichi D3A dive bombers, 18 Nakajima B5N torpedo bombers and 18 Mitsubishi A6M Zero fighters. Lieutenant Ema led 14 of Zuikaku's dive bombers. The strike force approached the USN carriers unopposed since USN interceptors missed them due to poor radar guidance. Takahashi devised and executed a well-coordinated attack, where 19 dive bombers and 14 torpedo bombers went for the nearer Lexington and 14 dive bombers and four torpedo bombers went for the farther Yorktown. Ema led the dive bombing attack on Yorktown, which was hit by a single bomb. His left wing was damaged during the attack and upon landing on Zuikaku, his aircraft was thrown overboard in order to make room for aircraft from the carrier Shōkaku, which was damaged in the meantime by USN dive bombers.

== Later career ==
In July 1942, Ema was transferred to the Saiki Air Group in Japan and became its leader. In May 1943, he was assigned as the leader (Hikōtaichō) of the 582nd Air Group and was sent to Rabaul to operate in the Solomon Islands. His group temporarily moved to Buin airfield to participate in Operation SE and were sent to attack the Allied shipping around Guadalcanal. After releasing the bombs on enemy transport ships anchored at Lunga, his squadron was ambushed by numerous Wildcat fighters. He managed to escape them but his D3A dive bomber was severely damaged and his observer was killed in the process. Due to a leaking fuel tank, he made an emergency stop at Vella Lavella before he returned back to Buin and subsequently to Rabaul.

In September 1943, Ema was transferred to the Mobara Air Group in Japan. In May 1944, he was promoted to lieutenant commander and was assigned to the 701st Air Group operating in Chitose on Hokkaido. In October same year, he was appointed as the commanding officer of a kamikaze unit in the Philippines. Finally, he was transferred back to the 701st Air Group in March 1945, where he remained until the end of the war.

Ema survived the war and later published a book that comprises a collection of battle accounts from several IJN dive bomber aircrew, including himself, Sadamu Takahashi, Keiichi Arima and Zenji Abe.
