= Kakuichi Takahashi =

Japanese World War II pilot

- 高橋 赫一
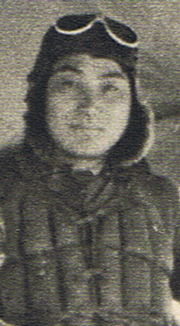
- Born: 29 November 1906; Ikeda, Tokushima, Japan
- Died: 8 May 1942 (aged 35); Coral Sea
- Military career
- Allegiance: Empire of Japan
- Branch: Imperial Japanese Navy Air Service (IJN)
- Rank: Captain
- Units: 13th Air Group; Kaga; Shōkaku
- Conflicts: Second Sino-Japanese War; World War II; Attack on Pearl Harbor; Bombing of Rabaul; Indian Ocean Raid; Battle of the Coral Sea †

Kakuichi Takahashi (高橋 赫一, Takahashi Kakuichi; 29 November 1906 – 9 May 1942) was a dive bomber pilot officer in the Imperial Japanese Navy (IJN) during World War II. He is best known for leading several strikes against the United States Navy during the Battle of the Coral Sea, where they sank the carrier Lexington, the oiler Neosho and the destroyer Sims, and damaged Yorktown. He was killed in action during the final stages of the battle.

== Early career ==
Kakuichi Takahashi entered the Imperial Japanese Naval Academy in 1926 and graduated from the 56th class in March 1928. He was commissioned as an ensign in November 1929. In December 1931, he was promoted to lieutenant junior grade and was selected for the navy pilot training program at Kasumigaura Air Group, from which he graduated in 1932. In December 1934, he was promoted to full lieutenant.

Takahashi later served on the carrier Kaga before he was transferred to the 13th Air Group operating in China. He was eventually promoted to lieutenant commander and became Air Group Commander (Hikōtaichō) of the carrier Shōkaku. He led Aichi D3A dive bombers during the Attack on Pearl Harbor on 7 December 1941 and during the Bombing of Rabaul in January 1942. In April 1942, he participated in the Indian Ocean Raid, where he led the strike force that sank the British carrier Hermes.

== Coral Sea ==
In May 1942, Lieutenant Commander Takahashi participated in Operation MO to capture Port Moresby, which resulted in the Battle of the Coral Sea. On the morning of 7 May, Japanese scout planes spotted the oiler Neosho and the destroyer Sims just south of the IJN carrier fleet and misidentified the ships as a carrier and a cruiser respectively. Rear Admiral Chuichi Hara, the tactical commander of the carrier division, launched a strike force of 36 Aichi D3A dive bombers, 24 Nakajima B5N torpedo bombers and 18 Mitsubishi A6M Zero fighters, under Takahashi's overall command. While the strike force was heading south, the actual US carrier fleet was sighted to the northwest of the previous contact. Unsure about the conflicting information from the sightings, and unwilling to break radio silence in case it revealed the presence of his fleet, Hara did not recall the strike force. Upon arrival at the target area at 0915, they could only find an oiler and a destroyer and spent two hours searching for the carriers. Unable to find any, Lieutenant Commander Takahashi ordered the torpedo bombers and the escorting fighters to return home at 1115, while his dive bombers went for Neosho and Sims. Four bombers attacked Sims and scored three hits, sinking her almost immediately, while the remaining 32 attacked Neosho and scored at least seven hits.

After returning to the carriers, Lieutenant Commander Takahashi was selected to lead a late afternoon strike to attack the US carriers, which consisted of 12 Aichi D3A dive bombers and 15 Nakajima B5N torpedo bombers. Since the late departure meant that the strike would have to land at night, only veteran pilots were selected (including Lieutenant Commander Shigekazu Shimazaki and Lieutenant Tamotsu Ema). Due to poor weather, the strike force missed the US carriers. However, when they passed, they were detected by US radar, which led to Grumman F4F Wildcat fighters led by Lieutenant Commanders Paul Ramsey and James Flatley being sent to intercept. The ambush resulted in seven B5Ns and one D3A being shot down (another B5N took heavy damage and ditched on the return flight). In the aftermath, Takahashi and Shimazaki agreed to call off the strike, and the surviving planes jettisoned their bombs and torpedoes. During the return flight, several D3As stumbled across the US carriers but could do nothing more than report their position. Furthermore, the darkness and confusion led to a few attempting to land on Yorktown, believing it to be their own carrier. They quickly aborted the landing when the ship's anti-aircraft batteries opened up. However, none were lost, and the remaining 11 dive bombers and 7 torpedo bombers returned and successfully landed on the Japanese carriers during the night.

The next morning, 8 May, the two carrier fleets sighted each other. Eager to make up for the previous day, the Japanese launched a strike force of 33 Aichi D3A dive bombers, 18 Nakajima B5N torpedo bombers and 18 Mitsubishi A6M Zero fighters, again commanded by Takahashi. They approached the US carriers unopposed since the Grumman Wildcats sent to intercept missed them due to poor radar guidance. Takahashi devised and executed a well-coordinated attack, where 19 dive bombers and 14 torpedo bombers went for the nearer Lexington (which Takahashi misidentified as the Saratoga) and 14 dive bombers and four torpedo bombers went for the farther Yorktown. Lexington was hit by two bombs and two torpedoes, while Yorktown was hit by a single bomb. Takahashi stayed in the area for some time to estimate the damage inflicted on the US carriers and radioed his reports back to Hara. Notably, at 1217 he advised Hara to cancel his earlier (1125) sinking report on the "Saratoga" (as the Lexington temporarily recovered from the damage and resumed operations) and await his return. However, Takahashi never made it back - he was shot down and killed, most likely by an F4F Wildcat returning from the US strike. He was posthumously promoted by two ranks to captain, and, on 1 January 1943, a special letter of commendation was issued by Admiral Isoroku Yamamoto.
