= Shigekazu Shimazaki =

Japanese admiral (1908–1945)

- 嶋崎 重和
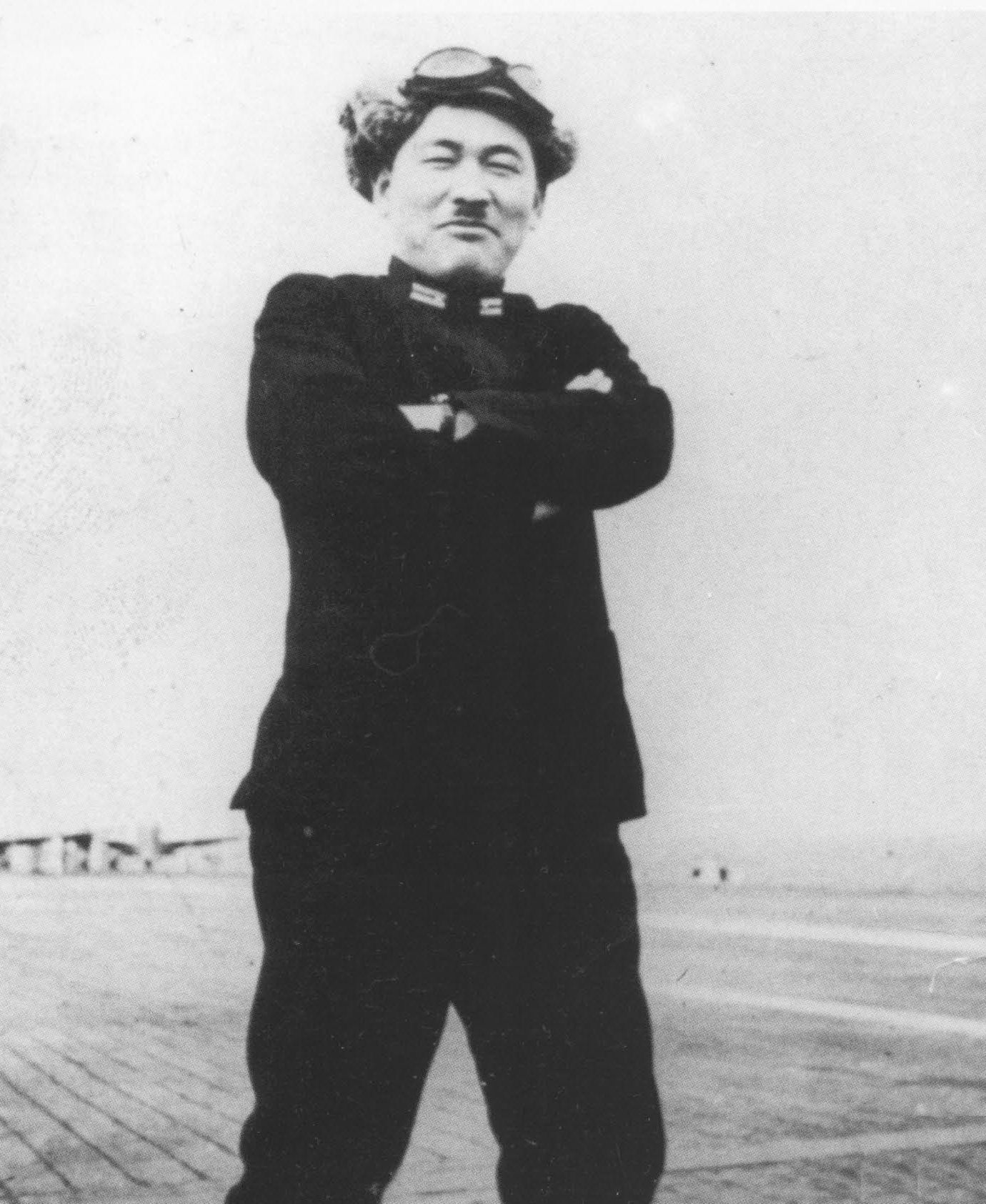
- Shimazaki aboard the carrier Zuikaku
- Born: September 9, 1908; Ōita, Japan
- Died: January 9, 1945 (aged 36) near Taiwan
- Military career
- Allegiance: Empire of Japan
- Branch: Imperial Japanese Navy
- Service years: 1929–1945
- Rank: Rear Admiral (posthumous)
- Commands: Wing Leader Zuikaku; Senior Air Officer 752nd Kōkūtai (based in Taiwan); Senior Air Officer Nagoya Kōkūtai; Staff officer 2nd Air Fleet; Staff officer 3rd Air Fleet
- Conflicts: World War II; Pacific War; Attack on Pearl Harbor; Indian Ocean raid; Battle of the Coral Sea; Aerial Battle of Taiwan-Okinawa

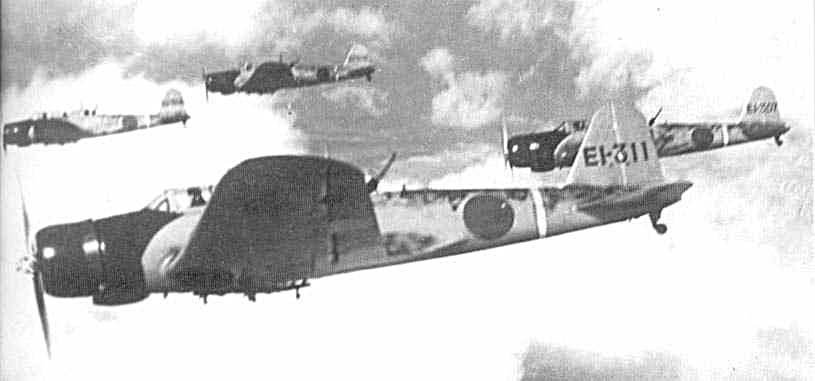
Nakajima B5N2 "Kate" torpedo bomber from the carrier Shōkaku. The tail mark 'EI-311' indicates this is one of the torpedo bombers (used as high level bombers) led by Shimazaki during the attack on Pearl Harbor.

Shigekazu Shimazaki (嶋崎 重和, Shimazaki Shigekazu; 9 September 1908 – 9 January 1945) was a Japanese career officer in the Imperial Japanese Navy Air Service during World War II.

== Biography ==
Shimazaki was a native of Ōita Prefecture and a graduate of the 57th class of the Imperial Japanese Navy Academy in 1929, ranking 31st of 122 cadets. He served his midshipman duty on the cruisers Iwate and Haguro, after which, as a second lieutenant, transferred to the Imperial Japanese Navy Air Service, enrolling in flight training in 1932. By 1934, he was serving as an instructor at Kasumigaura, Ibaraki in torpedo bomber piloting and techniques.

From 1935 to 1937, he alternated tours of duty as section commander on the aircraft carrier Kaga and ground training. With the start of the Second Sino Japanese War in 1937, his group was deployed to the ground base in Shanghai, where he experienced a number of bombing missions as the war between Japan and China escalated. He was transferred to the carrier Sōryū from March–December 1938, returning to Yokosuka as an instructor. He returned to combat duty on the carrier Akagi from November 1939-November 1940, when he was promoted to lieutenant commander.

In September 1941, Shimazaki was assigned as equipping officer of the new carrier Zuikaku, responsible for forming its new air wing, with himself becoming its commander when the ship was ready for duty.

Shimazaki is best known as the leader of the second wave of the air attack on Pearl Harbor on 7 December 1941. He was piloting a Nakajima B5N2 "Kate" and led the attack group of 54 high-level bombers and 78 dive bombers. For this success he and Mitsuo Fuchida, the leader of the 1st wave of attack, were awarded with an audience with Emperor Shōwa at the Tokyo Imperial Palace on December 25.

Four months later, Shimazaki was again on board Zuikaku and participated in the raid on Trinkomalee on 9 April 1942, during which he led 18 "Kates" and bombed the ground facilities of the port city of the British-ruled Ceylon.

A month later, Shimazaki participated in the Battle of the Coral Sea. On the morning of 7 May 1942, his attack group took off Zuikaku in search of the US aircraft carriers. They were unable to find the carriers, however, but did locate the fleet oiler USS Neosho and its escort destroyer USS Sims instead. After further fruitless searching, Shimazaki's colleague from Shokaku, Lt Cdr Kakuichi Takahashi, ordered him to take the torpedo bombers home rather than waste their ordnance on small targets. Shimazaki complied, while Takahashi attacked with his dive bombers, sinking Sims and heavily damaging Neosho. Later that evening, he took part in an attempted night attack on the US carriers. However, the group was jumped by F4Fs before they could find their targets, and nine planes - primarily crewed by division and section leaders - were lost. Shimazaki's group took particularly heavy losses - five planes lost out of nine - but he survived to return to Zuikaku.

The following day - 8 May 1942 - Shimazaki led Zuikaku's "Kates" in the attack on USS Lexington. Teaming up with his Shokaku counterparts, they succeeded in crippling the carrier, which later sank (The previous day, aircraft from Lexington had sunk carrier Shoho). However, his plane took heavy damage, forcing him to ditch on his return.

In July 1942, Shimazaki was transferred to Kure Naval District. He spent the rest of his career as a ground-based air officer. He was promoted to commander in October 1944.

Shimazaki was killed in action in January 1945, near Taiwan, as a staff officer of the 3rd Air Fleet. He was posthumously promoted two ranks to rear admiral.
