= Operation SO and SE =

1943 World War II aerial offensive

Operation SE
- Part of the Pacific Theater of World War II
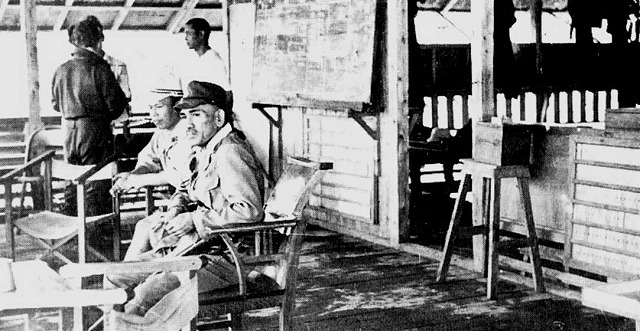
- Vice Admiral Jinichi Kusaka (front) at Rabaul in 1943
Date	7–16 June 1943
Location	Solomon Islands
Result	Inconclusive

Belligerents
United States	Japan

Commanders and leaders
Marc Mitscher	Jinichi Kusaka

Strength
100+ aircraft	94 aircraft

Casualties and losses
1 cargo ship damaged 1 LST damaged 6 aircraft	28 aircraft

Operation SO and SE (ソ作戦とセ作戦, SO Sakusen to SE Sakusen) were parts of an aerial offensive launched by Imperial Japanese forces against Allied forces staging around Guadalcanal area during the Solomon Islands Campaign in the Pacific Theater of World War II. The aerial offensive took place between 7 and 16 June 1943 and was aimed at destroying Allied air power and shipping. Operation SE involved airstrikes against Allied ships around Guadalcanal that were preparing for Invasion of New Georgia. It was preceded by the First and the Second Operation SO, which both involved fighter sweeps against Guadalcanal from several air groups of Imperial Japanese Navy Air Service (251st, 204th and 582nd Air Group). The resulting battles from these operations were dubbed as Lunga Air Battle (ja:ルンガ沖航空戦, Lunga-oki Kōkūsen) by the Japanese.

== Operation SO ==
The First Operation SO took place on 7 June 1943, where Lieutenant Commander Saburō Shindō of 582nd Air Group led a fighter sweep that included 81 Mitsubishi A6M Zero fighters (21 from 582nd, 24 A6M from 204th and 36 A6M from 251st Air group) against a variety of targets around Guadalcanal area (including the new Allied airfield in the Russell Islands). They were intercepted by a strong force of Allied fighters of various kind (F4Fs, F4Us, P-38s and P-39s). The resulting air battles accounted for several aircraft lost on both sides, where Petty Officer Hiroyoshi Nishizawa claimed two Allied aircraft destroyed.

The Second Operation SO took place five days later, on 12 June, where Lieutenant Zenjirō Miyano led 77 Zero fighters (24 from 204th, 32 A6M from 251st, and 21 from 582nd Air group) against the same targets. Similarly, as five days earlier, they were intercepted by a strong force of Allied fighters of various kinds and the ensuing air battles had a similar result.

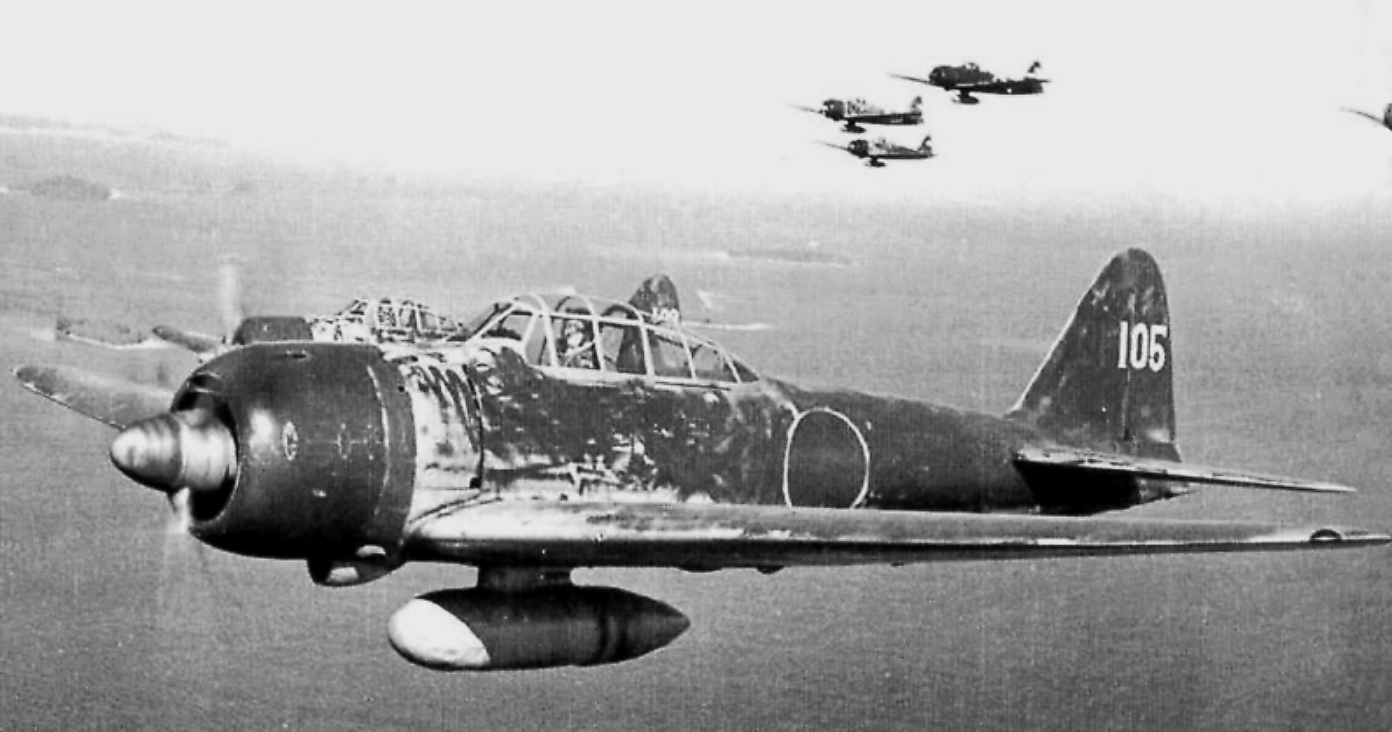
Mitsubishi A6M Zero Model 22 used in the operation.

== Operation SE ==
Unlike the First and the Second Operation SO, Operation SE also involved a strike against Allied ships off the coast of Lunga on Guadalcanal, in addition to the regular fighter sweep. The strike included 24 Aichi D3A dive bombers from the 582nd Air Group under the command of Lieutenant Tamotsu Ema. The escort and fighter sweep was provided by 70 Zero fighters (24 from 204th, 30 from 251st and 16 Zeros from 582nd Air Group) and was led by Lieutenant Commander Saburō Shindō and Lieutenant Miyano. The strike took off from Buin on Bougainville at 10:00 on 16 June 1943.

Lieutenant Ema's dive bombers reached Guadalcanal around 12:00 and attacked the Allied ships off Lunga, scoring hits on two Allied ships. The strike force was intercepted by a strong force of Allied fighters of various kinds, which resulted in air battles over the skies of Guadalcanal. Having noticed in previous missions that friendly dive bombers were often shot down after they released their bombs, Lieutenant Miyano of 204th Air Group devised a tactic that would involve fighters going to low altitude and provide fighter cover after the bomb release point. The escorting Zero fighters tested the new tactic during Ema's attack, and while it helped to better protect the dive bombers, Lieutenant Miyano was killed during the action.

== Aftermath ==
As with the similar effort in April by Operation I-Go, the success of Operation SE was limited as it did not impede the Allied advance up the Solomon Islands in any significant way. The dive bombers only managed to damage the cargo ship Celeno and the landing ship LST-340, while only six Allied fighters were lost. On the other hand, the cost for the Japanese was high as they lost 13 dive bombers and 15 Zero fighters. Additionally, the preceding First and Second Operation SO accounted for nine and seven Zero fighters lost, respectively. Furthermore, 204th Air Group lost its experienced leader (Hikōtaichō), Lieutenant Miyano.

== See also ==
Operation I-Go
