= Japanese aircraft carrier Zuikaku =

Shōkaku-class aircraft carrier

Coordinates: 19°20′N 125°51′E

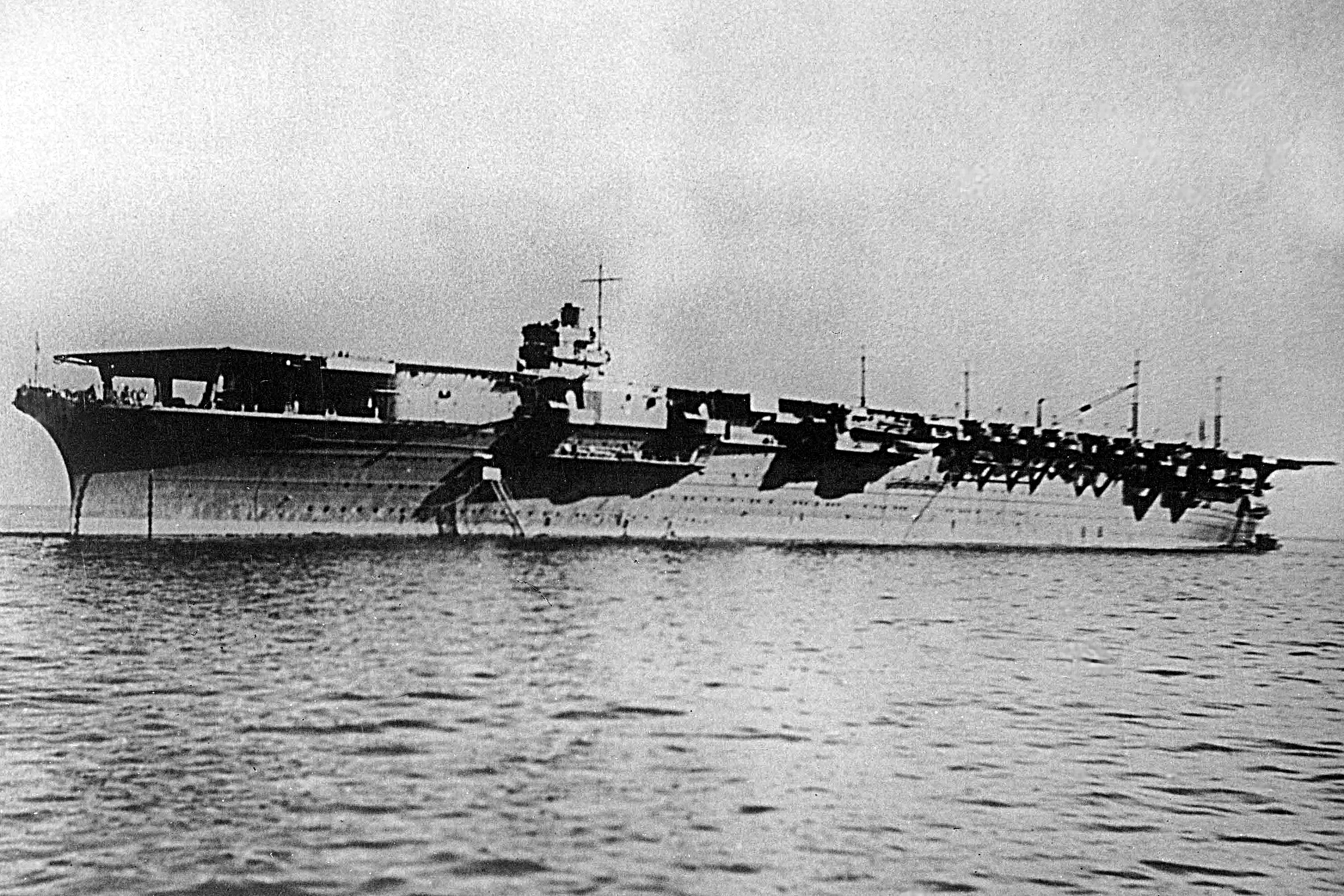
- Zuikaku anchored off Kobe upon her commissioning, 25 September 1941

History

Empire of Japan
- Name: Zuikaku
- Namesake: 瑞鶴, "Auspicious Crane"
- Builder: Kawasaki Kobe Shipyard
- Laid down: 25 May 1938
- Launched: 27 November 1939
- Commissioned: 25 September 1941
- Stricken: 26 August 1945
- Fate: Sunk by air attack in the Battle of Leyte Gulf, 25 October 1944

General characteristics (as built)
- Class & type: Shōkaku-class aircraft carrier
- Displacement: 32,105 t (31,598 long tons) (deep load)
- Length: 257.5 m (844 ft 10 in)
- Beam: 29 m (95 ft 2 in)
- Draft: 9.32 m (30 ft 7 in) (deep load)
- Depth: 23 m (75 ft 6 in)
- Installed power: 8 × water-tube boilers; 160,000 shp (120,000 kW)
- Propulsion: 4 × shafts; 4 × geared steam turbines
- Speed: 34.5 knots (63.9 km/h; 39.7 mph)
- Range: 9,700 nmi (18,000 km; 11,200 mi) at 18 knots (33 km/h; 21 mph)
- Complement: 1,660
- Armament: 8 × twin 127 mm (5 in) DP guns; 12 × triple 25 mm (1 in) AA guns
- Armor: Waterline belt: 46–165 mm (1.8–6.5 in); Deck: 65–132 mm (2.6–5.2 in)
- Aircraft carried: 72 (+12 spares); 7 December 1941: 18 × Mitsubishi A6M2 "Zero"; 27 × Aichi D3A1 "Val"; 27 × Nakajima B5N2 "Kate"

Zuikaku (Japanese: 瑞鶴; meaning "Auspicious Crane") was the second and last Shōkaku-class aircraft carrier built for the Imperial Japanese Navy (IJN) shortly before the beginning of the Pacific War. Zuikaku was one of the most modern Japanese aircraft carriers when commissioned, and saw successful action throughout numerous battles during the Pacific War; usually operating alongside her sister ship Shōkaku.

Zuikaku started the war as part of Kidō Butai. Her aircraft struck airfields during the attack on Pearl Harbor that formally brought the United States into the war, 7 December 1941. She attacked land positions to cover the Japanese invasions of New Guinea, before she participated in the Indian Ocean raid from 5-9 April 1942 where her aircraft helped to sink the light carrier HMS Hermes and the cargo ship SS Sagaing, alongside damaging others and destroying land facilities. Zuikaku and Shōkaku were sent to support Operation Mo later that May, the invasion of Port Moresby, during which she assisted Shōkaku in sinking the aircraft carrier USS Lexington and helped to sink the fleet oilier USS Neosho at the Battle of the Coral Sea; however heavy airgroup losses and damage to Shōkaku resulted in both carriers missing the Battle of Midway. Zuikaku fought US aircraft carriers at the Battle of the Eastern Solomons and helped to cripple the aircraft carrier USS Enterprise, and again at the Battle of the Santa Cruz Islands where she helped to sink the aircraft carrier USS Hornet. Zuikaku also sank the destroyer USS Meredith and the submarine USS Grayback on separate occasions.

During the Battle of the Philippine Sea Zuikaku was damaged for the first time by dive bombers from US carriers, and finally sunk at the battle of Leyte Gulf, 25 October 1944.

Zuikaku was one of six carriers to participate in the Pearl Harbor attack and was the last of the six to be sunk in the war (Akagi, Kaga, Hiryū, and Sōryū in the Battle of Midway; Shōkaku in the Battle of the Philippine Sea; and Zuikaku in the Battle of Leyte Gulf.)

A memorial for the fallen personnel of the Zuikaku is located at the grounds of Kashihara Shrine, located in the city of Kashihara, Nara Prefecture, Japan.

== Service history ==
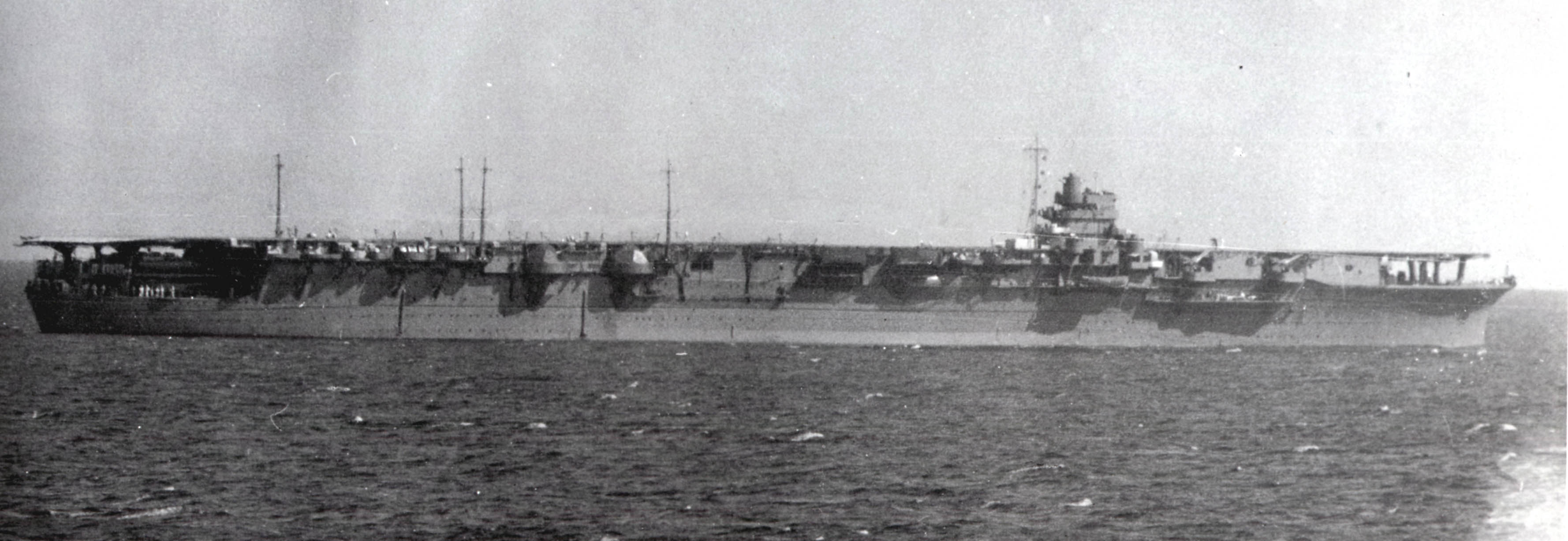
Zuikaku in November 1941

Zuikaku was laid down on 25 May 1938, launched on 27 November 1939, and formally commissioned on 25 September 1941. On the day of commissioning, Zuikaku departed on her maiden voyage from Kobe to Kure. Under the command of Captain Yokokawa Ichibei, Zuikaku departed for Oita Bight on 7 October, arriving at her destination the next day where for the first time she joined her sister ship Shōkaku. Both ships made up the 5th Carrier Division.

=== Attack on Pearl Harbor and subsequent activities ===
On 26 November 1941, she left Hitokappu Bay for the attack on Pearl Harbor as part of the Kidō Butai ("Mobile Force"). Her aircraft complement consisted of 18 Mitsubishi A6M "Zero" fighters, 27 Aichi D3A "Val" dive bombers, and 27 Nakajima B5N "Kate" torpedo bombers. On 7 December, she launched two waves of aircraft against American military installations on the island of Oahu. In the first wave, 25 Val dive bombers attacked Wheeler Army Airfield and five Zero fighters attacked the airbase at Kāneʻohe, Hawaii. In the second wave, 27 high-level Kate bombers attacked the airbase at Hickam Field. During the attack, Zuikaku lost no aircraft to enemy action, but two reconnaissance planes were forced to ditch after losing track of the carriers.

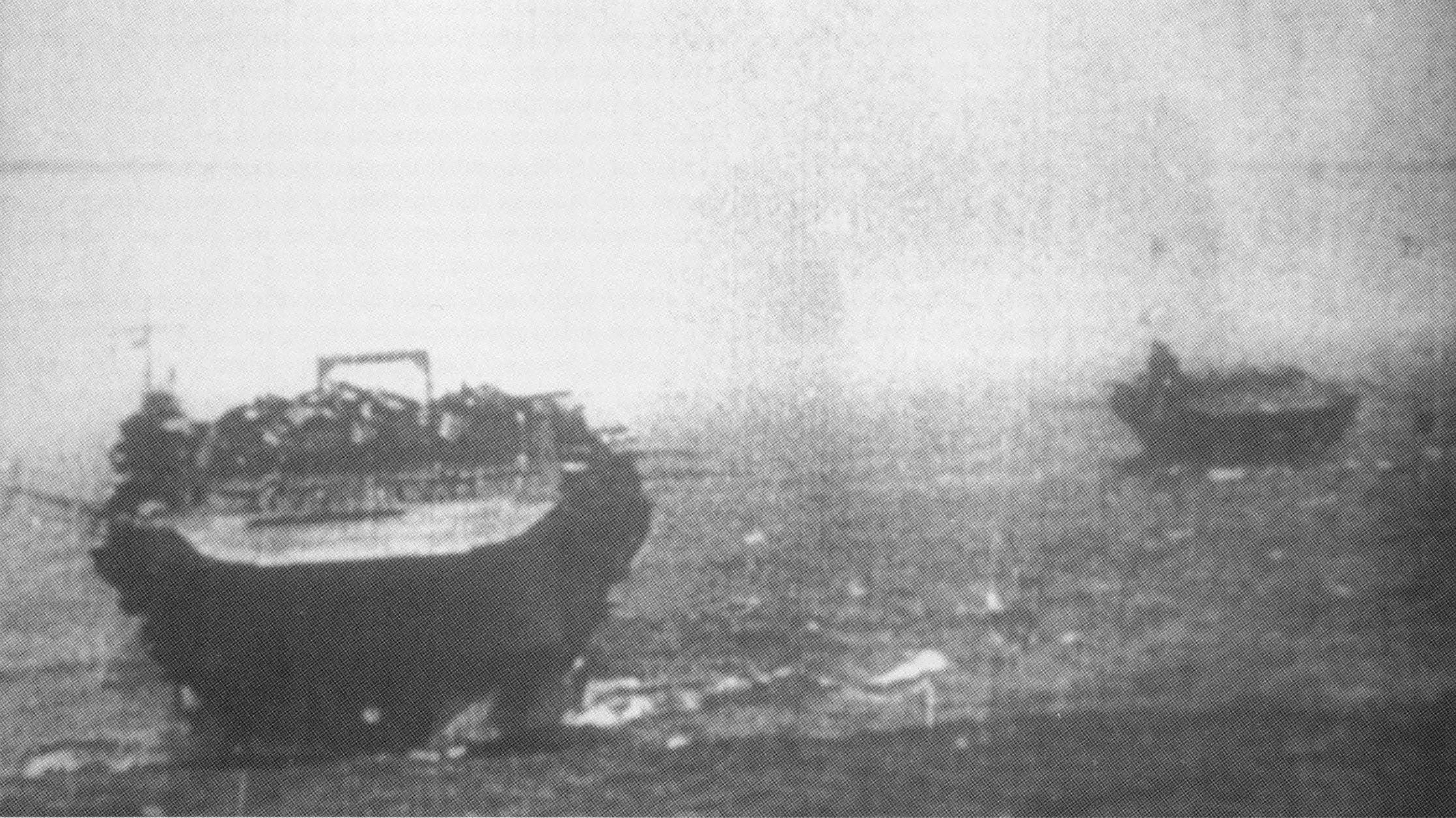
Zuikaku (right) and the aircraft carrier Kaga preparing to attack Pearl Harbor, 7 December 1941

On the 24th of December, Zuikaku arrived back at Kure alongside Shōkaku, Kaga, and Akagi (Sōryū and Hiryū having previously departed to attack Wake Island), and she was drydocked from the 30th to January 3rd. Meeting Shōkaku on the 5th, they departed Hiroshima Bay on the 8th, arriving at Truk on the 14th. In aid of the Japanese conquest against Pacific islands, on January 20 they launched 19 dive bombers and 6 fighters to attack Rabaul, then the next day struck both Lae and Salamaua, and on the 23rd launched strikes to aid the successful landings on both Rabaul and Kavieng before returning to Truk on the 29th. Zuikaku finally took part in a failed attempt to sweep for allied aircraft carriers on February 1st before departing back to Japan, arriving at Yokosuka on the 13th, where her pilots took part in vigorous training exercises until the 28th.

=== Indian Ocean Raid ===
Main Article: Indian Ocean Raid

On 17 March, Zuikaku and Shōkaku left Yokosuka and arrived at Staring Bay on the 24th where they met with Akagi, Sōryū, and Hiryū, and an escort of the battleships Kongō, Hiei, Kirishima, and Haruna, 2 heavy cruisers, 1 light cruiser, and 11 destroyers in preparation for Operation C; a planned carrier raid to destroy British shipping in the Indian Ocean. The force departed Starting Bay on 3 April. The next day, they were spotted by a Catalina flying boat which was shot down by anti-aircraft fire from the destroyer Kagerō and six fighters from Zuikaku, Sōryū, and Hiryū, but not before radioing the presence of Japanese ships to Air Vice-Marshall D'Albiac whom ordered local British warships to sail out of harbor in expectation of an attack.

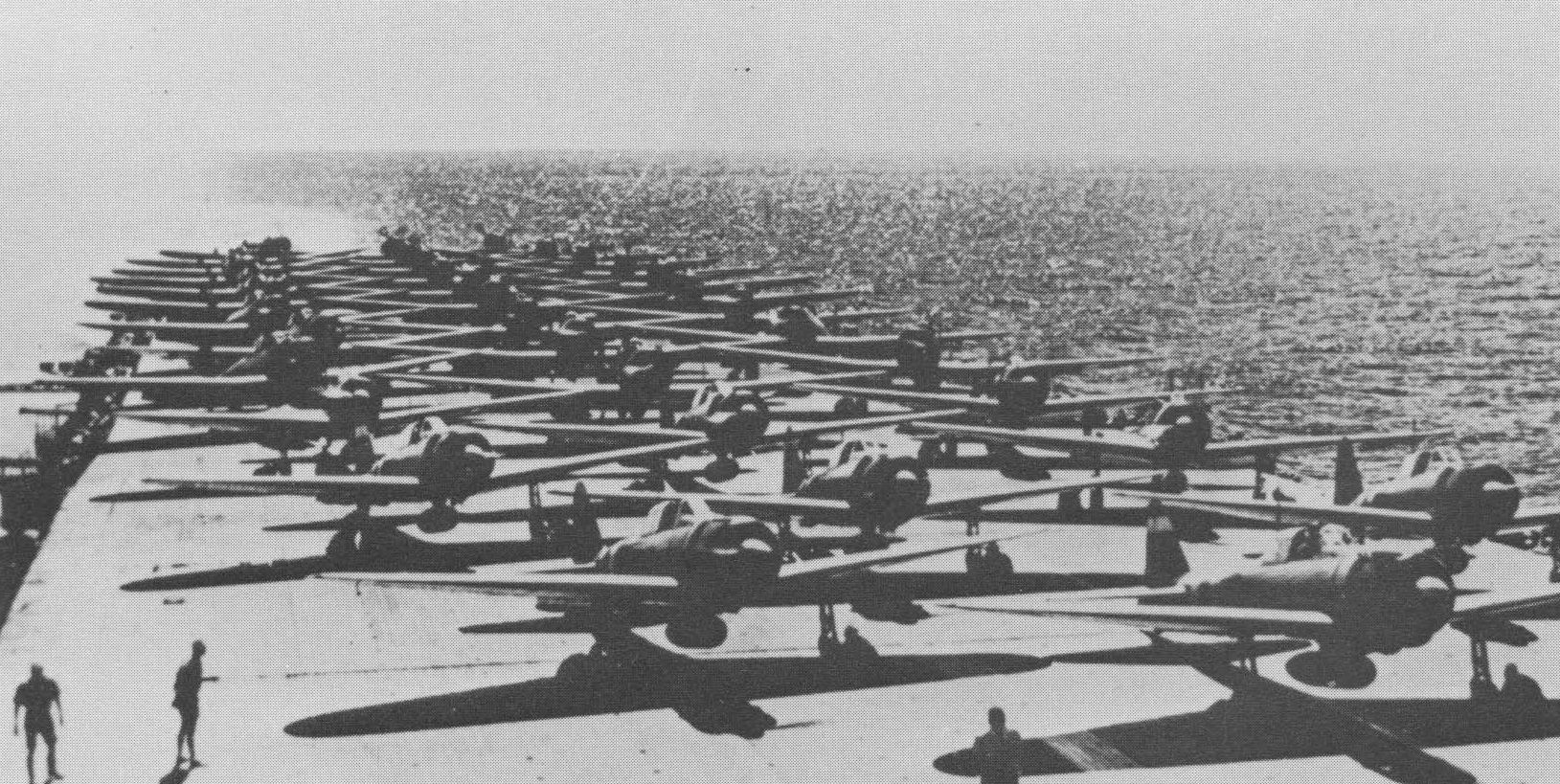
Zuikaku preparing to launch D3A "Val" dive bombers and A6M "Zero" fighters during the Indian Ocean raid, 5 April 1942

At 7:30 the next morning, Zuikaku lent 19 D3A "Val" dive bombers to a mass wave of attack aircraft to strike the port of Colombo, joining another 19 Vals from Shōkaku and 53 B5N "Kate" torpedo bombers from Sōryū, Hiryū and Akagi. Zuikaku also contributed 9 A6M "Zero" fighters to a squadron of 36. During the raid, 14 of Zuikaku's Vals first attacked the Colombo airfield and destroyed 9 Hurricane fighters out of a squadron of 30. Zuikaku's remaining dive bombers damaged the 8,012-ton British tanker San Cirilo. In the meantime, Shōkaku sank the armed merchant cruiser HMS Hector and damaged the depot ship HMS Lucia, while Akagi, Sōryū, and Hiryū destroyed several land facilities and sank the destroyer HMS Tenedos while she was docked for refit, then destroyed the 5,834-ton Norwegian tanker Soli. Later in the afternoon, 53 dive bombers from Akagi, Sōryū, and Hiryu sank the heavy cruisers HMS Cornwall and HMS Dorsetshire.

On the 9th, Zuikaku finally came to her own when she first joined the other carriers in raiding the port of Trincomalee. Zuikaku and Shōkaku attacked the 8,000-ton British steamship Sagaing and gouged her with a pair of bomb hits that detonated ammunition stored throughout the ship, killing 5 sailors. They left Sagaing to burn out and drift into the Malay Cove where she was blasted apart by a massive explosion 15 minutes later; earning Zuikaku her first definitive sinking. They also damaged the monitor HMS Erebus with 6 bomb near misses and killed at least 9 of her crew. In turn, Zuikaku lost two Zero fighters during the raid.

==== Sinking of HMS Hermes ====
At 9:00 a floatplane launched from the Haruna managed to locate the light carrier HMS Hermes and the destroyer HMAS Vampire operating 75 miles (120 km) off Trincomalee. In response, Zuikaku launched 14 Val dive bombers to join another 18 from Shokaku, and their combined air group located the enemy ships after 10:30. Their 32 combined dive bombers pulverized Hermes into a floating wreck. Just about every bomb launched hit and punched straight through the flight deck before exploding deep inside the ship. Fires subsequently reached the magazine and lifted the light carrier out of the water with a massive explosion, before a bomb directly smashed into the bridge and killed Hermes's entire command staff. Disabled and set ablaze, Hermes sank 15 minutes later with the loss of 307 men, earning Zuikaku partial credit for sinking the first aircraft carrier sunk to another aircraft carrier in history. Afterwards, dive bombers from Akagi attacked Vampire and scored several damaging near misses that broke the destroyer in half and sank her in 10 minutes with the loss of 8 men. Dive bombers from Sōryū and Hiryū never arrived in time to partake in either sinking, and they instead sank the corvette HMS Hollyhack and the tankers SS British Sergeant and SS Athelstane.

As the carriers and their escorts turned back for the Pacific Ocean on 10 April, Admiral Yamamoto decided that Zuikaku and Shōkaku should detach from the group for a planned invasion of Ports Moresby. Consequently on the 18th, Zuikaku detached from the Kido Butai escorted by the destroyers Maikaze and Hagikaze and arrived at Mako on the same day where she was resupplied. Zuikaku left Mako the next day with an escort of destroyer division 27's Shigure, Shiratsuyu, Ariake, and Yūgure where enroute the plans for Operation Mo was finalized; Zuikaku would join Shōkaku and the light carrier Shōhō in neutralizing Australian airbases - and deal with any allied aircraft carriers in the way - to cover the Japanese invasion convoy for Port Moresby. Zuikaku arrived at Truk on the 25th and remained there for the rest of the month.

=== Battle of the Coral Sea ===
Main Article: Battle of the Coral Sea

On 1 May, Zuikaku Shōkaku set sail with an escort of the heavy cruisers Myōkō and Haguro and 6 destroyers as the Port Moresby strike force under the command of admiral Takagi who took Myōkō as his flagship. Sailing after them came a secondary group consisting of the light carrier Shōhō, 4 heavy cruisers, and the destroyer Sazanami to attack Tulagi. While underway, the carriers were ordered to deliver 9 A6M Zeros to Truk but these efforts were thwarted by bad weather.

However, in the morning of 7 May at around 5:22, was one of Shōkaku's scout planes located a group of American ships, and at 5:45 "confirmed" the presence of an enemy aircraft carrier and a cruiser. In response, from 6:00 to 6:20 Zuikaku and Shōkaku launched a combined 24 torpedo bombers, 36 dive bombers, and 18 fighters to attack the opposing ships. Over two hours later, the swarm of aircraft found the reported location of the enemy force, only for the reported "aircraft carrier" to turn out to be the fleet oilier USS Neosho, escorted by the destroyer USS Sims. Consequently, the Japanese torpedo bombers were ordered to turn away from the action while the dive bombers scored a pair of easy kills. Zuikaku's 17 dive bombers joined forces with 15 Shōkaku Vals in attacking the Neosho. The first bomb hit the main deck on the port side and started a fire, while the second hit the stack deck and penetrated into the bunker tank before exploding, which ignited an even larger fire. A third bomb hit the port side, then a fourth tore into the fireroom and set off a steam leak that killed her entire stoker crew. Finally three more bombs punched through the ship without exploding but still blew large holes in Neosho's fuel tanks, all the while at least 8 damaging near misses punctured holes below the waterline and spouted splinters and shrapnel that killed many sailors on deck. One Zuikaku D3A piloted by Shigeo Ishizuka was shot down by AA fire from Neosho but managed to release its bomb while ablaze and spinning out. Ishizuka then dove the plane into the fleet oilier and struck her gun no 4, starting a massive fire that turned Neosho's deck into an inferno. The attack left Neosho as a floating wreck listing at 30 degrees to starboard which drifted for the next four days before being abandoned and scuttled with the loss of 150 crew members, leaving 107 to be rescued by the destroyer USS Henley.

In the meantime, four Shōkaku D3As split from the attack on Neosho to single out the Sims, and hit the destroyer with three bombs that broke her apart and rapidly sank the destroyer with the loss of most of her crew. However, almost concurrently with the attack on Neosho and Sims, Shōho was attacked by a wave of warplanes from two actual American aircraft carriers, the USS Yorktown and USS Lexington, and was sunk to a claimed 13 bomb and 7 torpedo hits.

On the 8th, a spotter plane from Lexington located both Zuikaku and Shōkaku, and both carriers attacked with their air groups. Hidden by a rain squall, Zuikaku escaped detection, but Shōkaku was hit three times by bombs and was unable to launch or recover her aircraft. In return, Zuikaku's planes located the American carriers, and proceeded to wreak havoc on both ships. First, Zuikaku's torpedo bombers, commanded by Shigekazu Shimazaki, caught Lexington in a pincer attack, hitting the flat top with two torpedoes, cutting her speed to 24 knots and punching through the gasoline storage tanks, leaking gas fumes throughout the ship. Her dive bombers, commanded by Tamotsu Ema, then attacked and crippled Yorktown with a bomb hit that caused severe damage to her hangar bay and aviation storage rooms and over a dozen near misses. Shōkaku's dive bombers then hit Lexington with three bombs to her flight deck, starting a large fire.

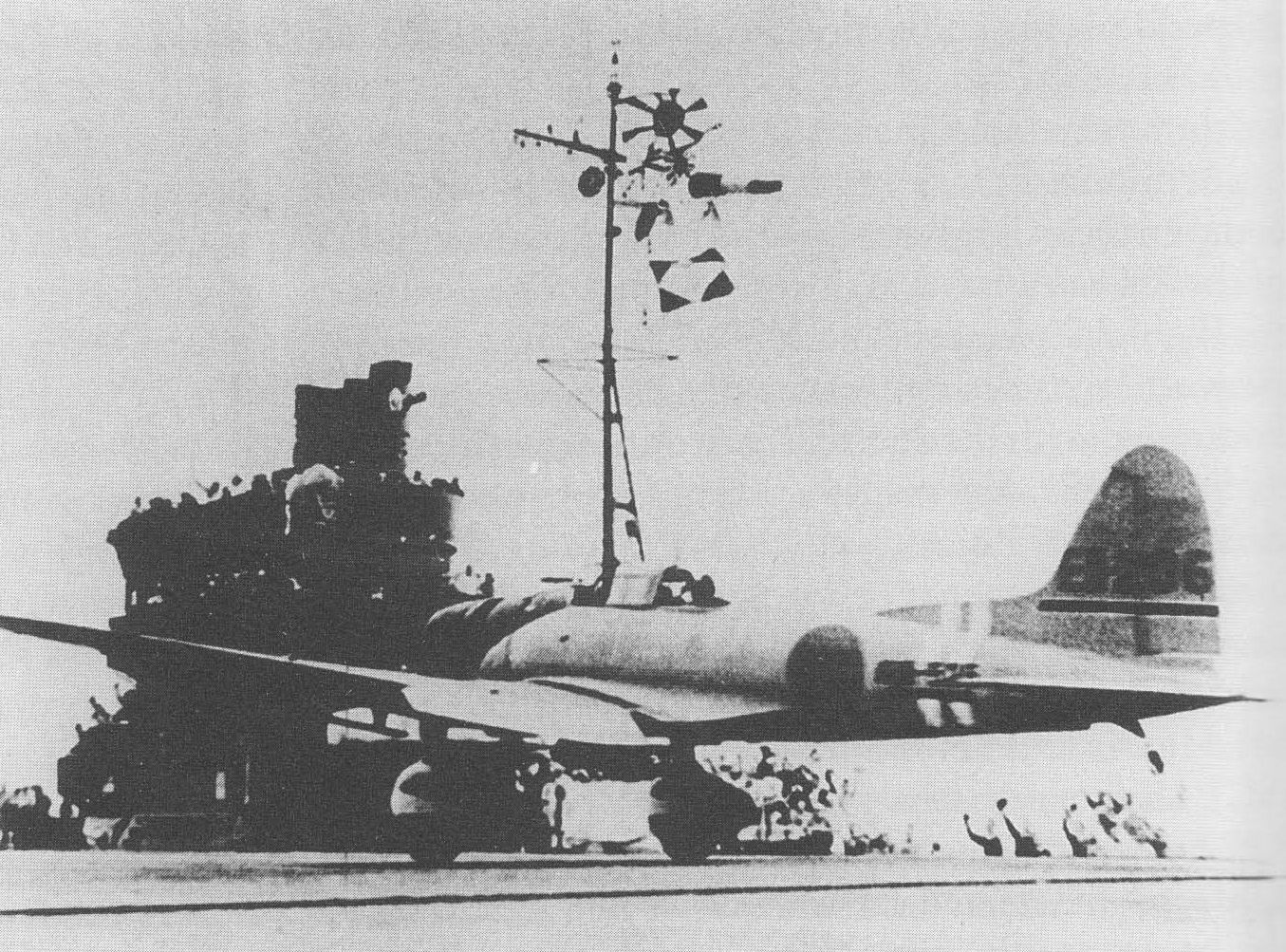
Zuikaku launching a D3A Val during the battle of the Coral Sea, 8 May 1942.

Damage control efforts quickly persisted on Lexington, putting out the fires from Shōkaku's bomb hits. However, gas fumes from Zuikaku's torpedo hits leaked throughout the ship. When the fumes reached electric motors, a chain reaction of explosion after explosion riddled Lexington with fatal damage. Lexington began to sink, as her crew was evacuated. To make sure she hit the ocean floor and wasn't captured by Japanese forces, Lexington was scuttled by escorting destroyers.

Zuikaku was undamaged in the battle, but sustained severe losses in aircraft and aircrew. This required her to return to Japan with her sister ship for resupply and aircrew training, and neither carrier was able to take part in the Battle of Midway in June 1942, where every carrier that participated in the Pearl Harbor attack besides the two Shōkaku-class ships was sunk by American carrier-based aircraft. Both ships returned to Kure, Shōkaku still operating under her own power despite immense damage. On the 21st, Zuikaku was targeted by the submarine USS Pollack, but was not damaged. She spent the rest of June and July transiting to various ports and naval facilities.

=== Battle of the Eastern Solomons ===
In August 1942, commanded by Captain Tameteru Notomo, Zuikaku was dispatched as part of the First Carrier Division along with the repaired Shōkaku and their escorts to oppose the American offensive in the Solomon Islands. Their goal was to sink US shipping operating in the Solomons to aid in recapturing Henderson Field, an ex-Japanese air base which was captured by American forces and being used against Japanese shipping to great effect.

On the 24th, a floatplane launched from the heavy cruiser Chikuma spotted a large American task force, consisting of the aircraft carriers USS Enterprise and USS Saratoga, and their escorts, battleship USS North Carolina, four cruisers, and eleven destroyers. Subsequently, both Zuikaku and Shōkaku launched 37 aircraft and attacked the US ships. Due to the haste of Japanese pilots, almost all attacks were focused on Enterprise to heavy results. The effectiveness of US anti aircraft, particularly of North Carolina's part, shot down many attacking aircraft, but in the end, both carriers crippled Enterprise with three bomb hits. They nearly sank her, with a squadron of seven dive bombers, three from Shōkaku and four from Zuikaku, nearly delivering the final blow when North Carolina shot down every single attacking plane.

Neither Zuikaku or Shōkaku were damaged during the battle, although Shōkaku barely avoided being bombed by Enterprise. However, together they lost 25 aircraft out of 37 launched, and planes from Saratoga sank the light carrier Ryūjō, while planes from Henderson Field sank the destroyer Mutsuki and the troopship Kinryu Maru. The battle is considered a US victory as Zuikaku and the other Japanese ships retreated without sinking a single American vessel.

=== Battle of Santa Cruz ===
While the US still maintained air superiority through Henderson field, their carrier force was greatly diminished. After her big action, Saratoga was crippled by a torpedo fired from the submarine I-26, putting her out of action, while in September the aircraft carrier USS Wasp was sunk by three torpedo hits fired by the submarine I-19. These actions left USS Hornet as the only American fleet carrier operating in the Pacific, shortly joined by the repaired Enterprise. Taking advantage of this, Zuikaku and Shōkaku were sent out to attack the remaining US carriers in a decisive battle, now joined by the aircraft carrier Jun'yō and the light carrier Zuihō and their escorts. This would culminate in the Battle of the Santa Cruz Islands.

The force set out on October 11. On the 15th, a Japanese patrol plane spotted the destroyer USS Meredith towing a barge that carried fuel and bombs for US forces at Guadalcanal. Zuikaku's air group quickly responded, and in a ten-minute battle hit Meredith with three torpedoes and a number of bombs, causing the destroyer to roll over and sink. The force continued on, and on the 26th was spotted by a Catalina seaplane, shortly followed by the attacks of both Hornet and Enterprise, just as the Japanese wanted. Dive bombers from Enterprise hit Zuihō with a bomb that prevented her from recovering aircraft, while dive bombers from Hornet scorched Shōkaku with at least 3–4 (and potentially up to 6) bomb hits and damaged the heavy cruiser Chikuma with two bombs.

In return, the Japanese planes wreaked havoc on American shipping. Fighters from Zuihō shot down an American torpedo bomber, which in a bamboozling series of events launched its torpedo as it crashed in a friendly fire incident that sank the destroyer USS Porter, while Jun'yō damaged the battleship USS South Dakota and the light cruiser USS San Juan with bomb hits. Zuikaku focused her attacks on Hornet, and hit her with three bombs. Two of her bombers that were shot down proceeded to crash into Hornet, one of which still had its bomb equipped which exploded on impact. Meanwhile, planes from Shōkaku hit Hornet with two torpedoes. The damage from both ships left Hornet dead in the water and heavily listing.

Under tow from the heavy cruiser USS Northampton, damage control efforts attempted to correct the list on the crippled, but not sunk Hornet in an attempt to save the ship. However, further air attacks persisted. A flight of nine torpedo bombers from both Shōkaku and Jun'yō attacked the flat top, and while Jun'yō's planes missed, Shōkaku hit Hornet with a third and fatal torpedo which caused the US to abandon all efforts to save Hornet.

Zuikaku hit Hornet with another bomb while US destroyers attempted to scuttle Hornet (though due to the quality of US torpedoes, all either missed or failed to explode). Hornet slowly sank, and was listing at a 45-degree angle when she was discovered by the destroyers Akigumo and Makigumo. They fired their torpedoes, claiming three hits. Because of this, they are sometimes credited with sinking Hornet, but she was already sinking due to damage from the previous air attacks, and would have sunk regardless of any further damage, meaning it's debatable whether they deserve credit for Hornet's sinking as opposed to the carrier's loss being pinned solely on the Shōkaku twins.

Of the 110 aircraft launched by the Japanese carriers, only 67 returned to Zuikaku. She then returned to the home islands via Truk for training and aircraft ferrying duties.

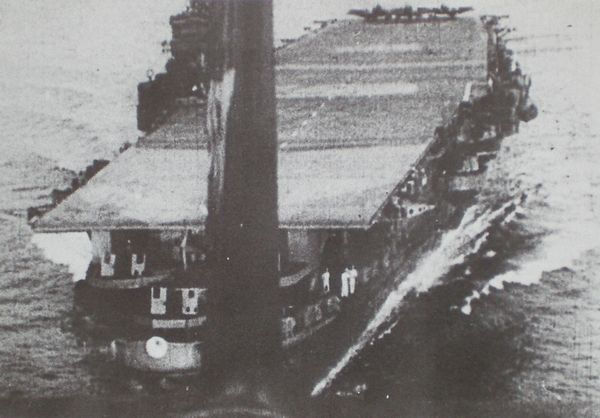
Zuikaku launching a Kate torpedo bomber in September of 1944.

In February 1943, she covered the evacuation of Japanese ground forces from Guadalcanal. In May, she was assigned to a mission to counterattack the American offensive in the Aleutian Islands, but this operation was cancelled after the Allied victory on Attu on 29 May 1943. Later in 1943, under the command of Captain Kikuchi Tomozo, she was again based at Truk and operated against U.S. forces in the Marshall Islands, but never managed to see combat throughout the rest of the year.

Zuikaku started off 1944 by entering drydock at Kure on January 8, and leaving drydock on the 17th. On February 13, Zuikaku was assigned to carrier division 1 alongside Shōkaku, and over 2 days received her air group, but her new pilots were poorly trained and inexperienced, a grand fall from the glory days of the Kidō Butai. However, they were sufficient to score Zuikaku another kill when on 27 February, her torpedo bombers hunted down the submarine USS Grayback and quickly sank her with a single 250-kilogram (551 lb) bomb hit. After ferrying aircraft to Singapore and being drydocked, she joined Shōkaku and the new armored aircraft carrier Taihō.

=== Battle of the Philippine Sea ===
In June she was assigned to Operation A-Go, an attempt to repulse the Allied invasion of the Mariana Islands. On 19 June, in the Battle of the Philippine Sea, Taihō and Shōkaku were both sunk by American submarines, leaving Zuikaku, the only survivor of Carrier Division One, to recover the Division's few remaining aircraft. On 20 June, a bomb hit started a fire in the hangar, but Zuikaku's experienced damage control teams managed to get it under control, and she was able to escape under her own power. After this battle, Zuikaku was the only survivor of the six fleet carriers that had launched the attack on Pearl Harbor.

=== Battle off Cape Engaño ===
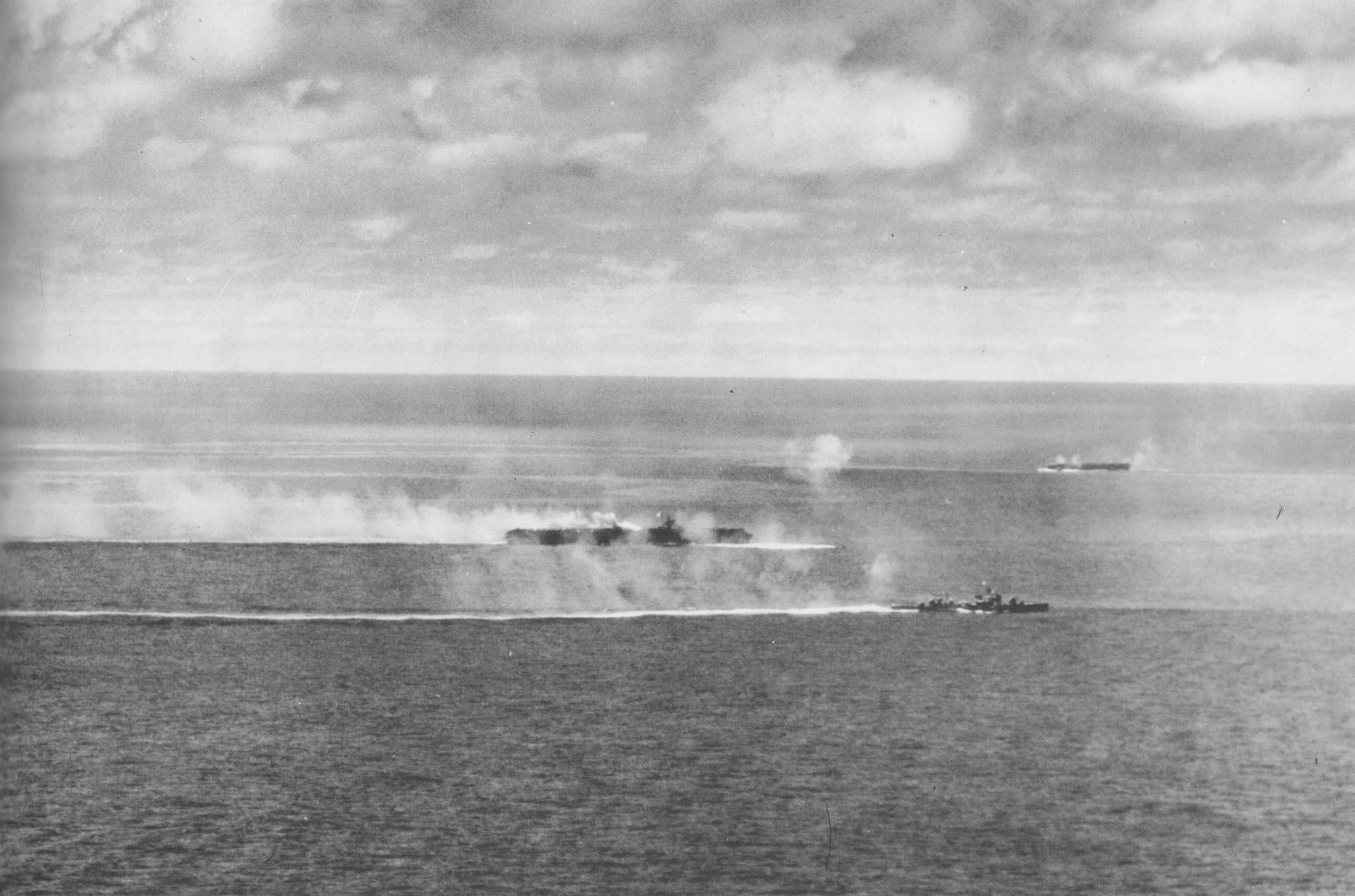
Zuikaku and destroyer Wakatsuki underway during U.S. carrier plane attacks. The carrier Zuihō is in the background.

In October 1944, she was the flagship of Admiral Jisaburo Ozawa's decoy Northern Force in Operation Shō-Gō 1, the Japanese counterattack to the Allied landings on Leyte. On 24 October, as part of the depleted Third Carrier Division, which had just 108 aircraft across four carriers, she launched aircraft along with the light carriers Zuihō, Chitose, and Chiyoda in an ineffective strike against the U.S. Third Fleet. Several of these aircraft were shot down, and the majority of the surviving aircraft did not return to the carriers, instead landing at Japanese land bases on Luzon. However, some of her aircraft made kamikaze attacks and helped sink the light carrier USS Princeton; and most of the others were sent to other surviving carriers and air bases, to later sink the escort carrier USS St. Lo during the Battle off Samar after again using the new kamikaze tactics.

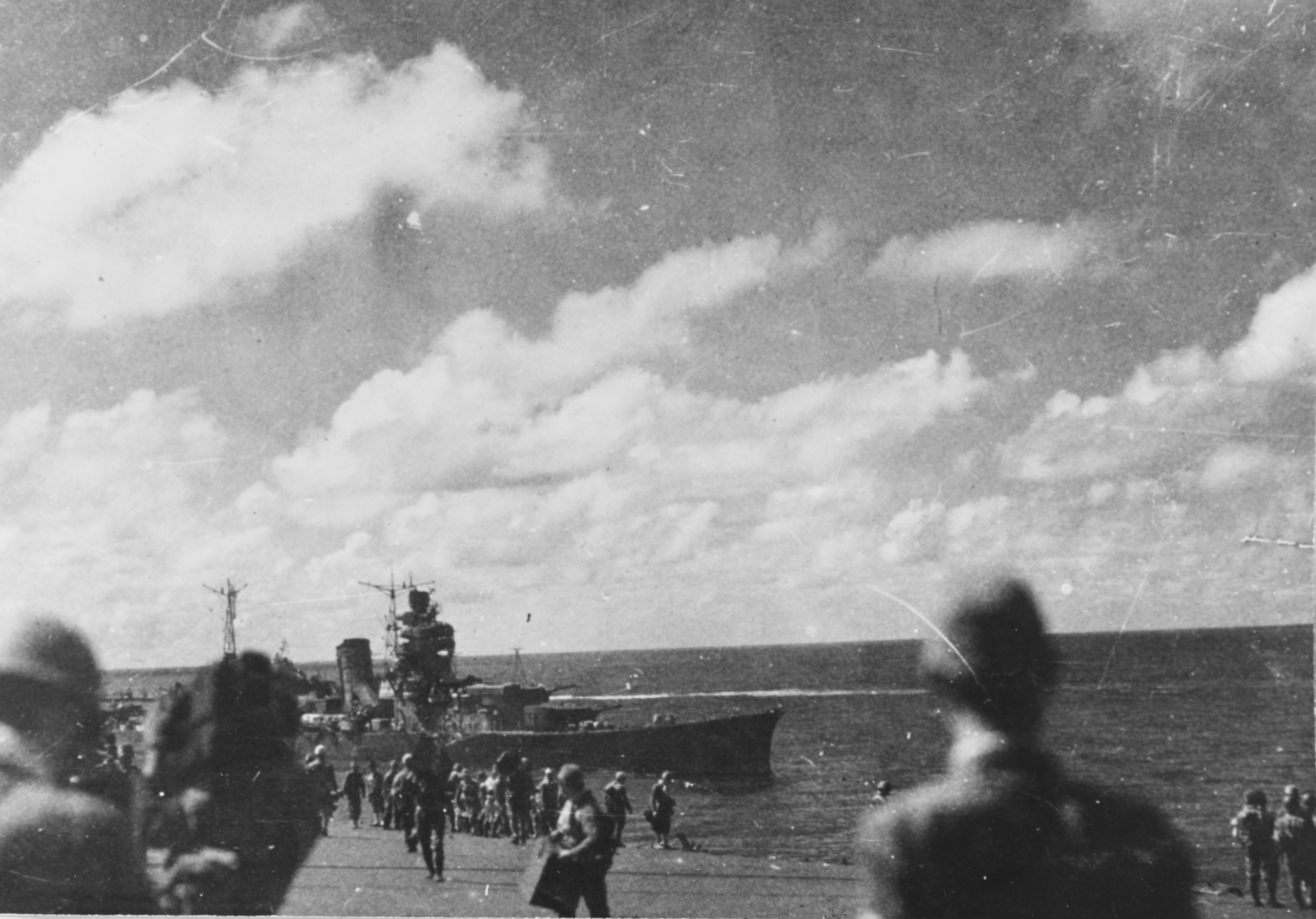
Ozawa transfers his flag from the sinking Zuikaku to the light cruiser Ōyodo.

The next day, during the Battle off Cape Engaño, she launched her few remaining aircraft for combat air patrol, search, or to join the aircraft already on Luzon. She then came under heavy air attack and was hit by seven torpedoes and nine bombs. With Zuikaku listing heavily to port, Ozawa shifted his flag to the light cruiser Ōyodo. The order to abandon ship was issued at 13:58 and the naval ensign was lowered. Zuikaku rolled over and sank stern-first at 14:14, taking the lives of Rear Admiral (promoted from captain 10 days earlier) Kaizuka Takeo and 842 of the ship's crew; 862 officers and men were rescued by the destroyers Wakatsuki and Kuwa. Before her loss, Zuikaku was the last surviving Japanese carrier to have attacked Pearl Harbor. She was also the only Japanese fleet carrier (as opposed to a light carrier) to have been sunk by aircraft-launched torpedoes, as all others were sunk by bombs delivered by dive bombers or submarine-launched torpedoes.

== Gallery ==
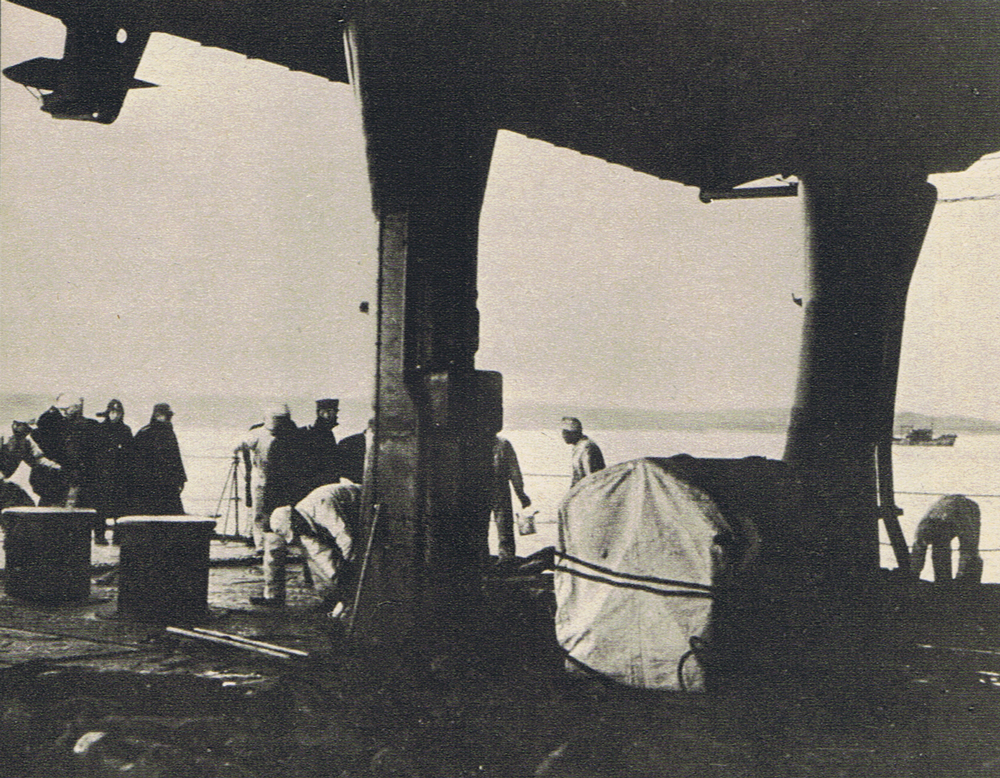
Sailors winching up the anchor on the quarterdeck of Zuikaku, 26 November 1941.

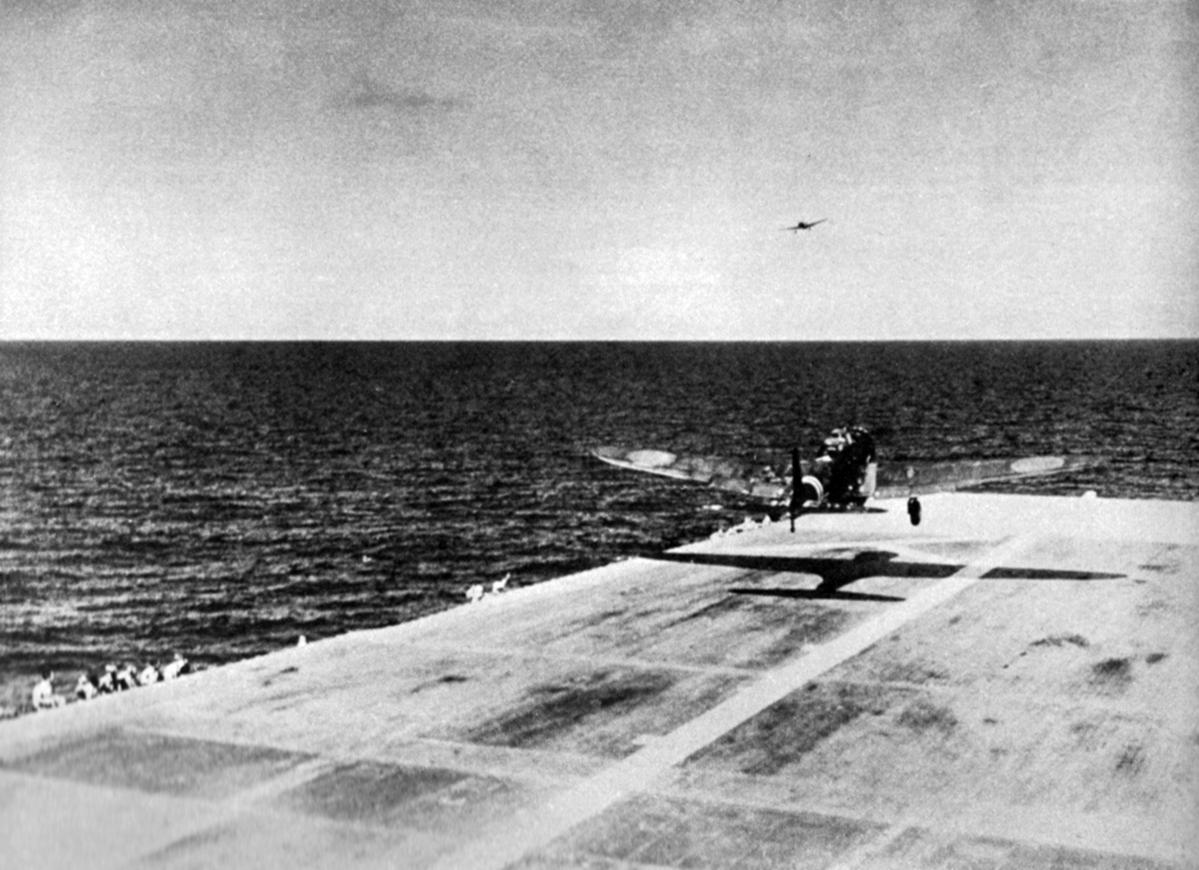
A Nakajima B5N2 "Kate" taking off from Zuikaku to attack Pearl Harbor, 7 December 1941.

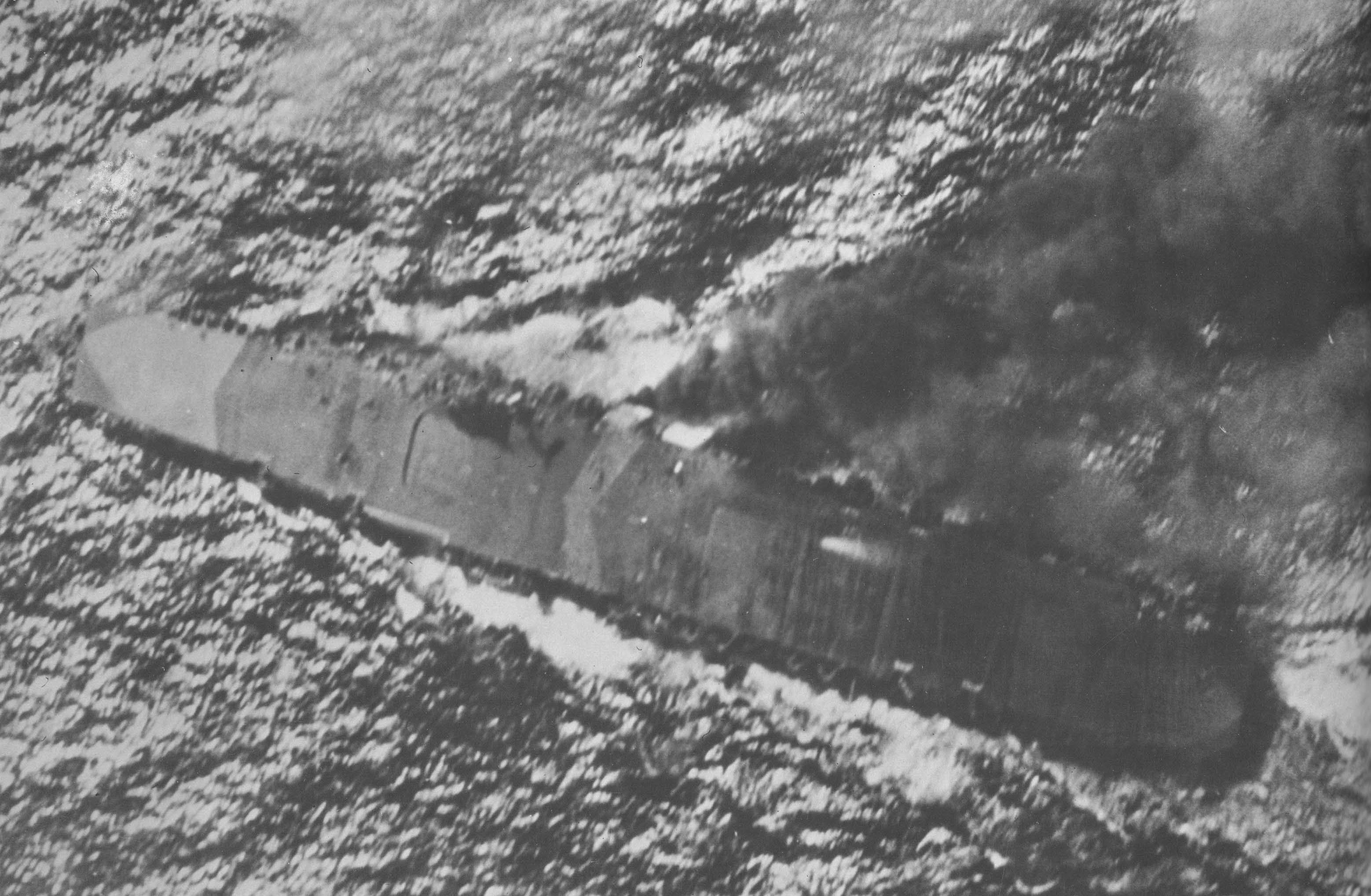
Zuikaku during the Battle off Cape Engaño, 25 October 1944.

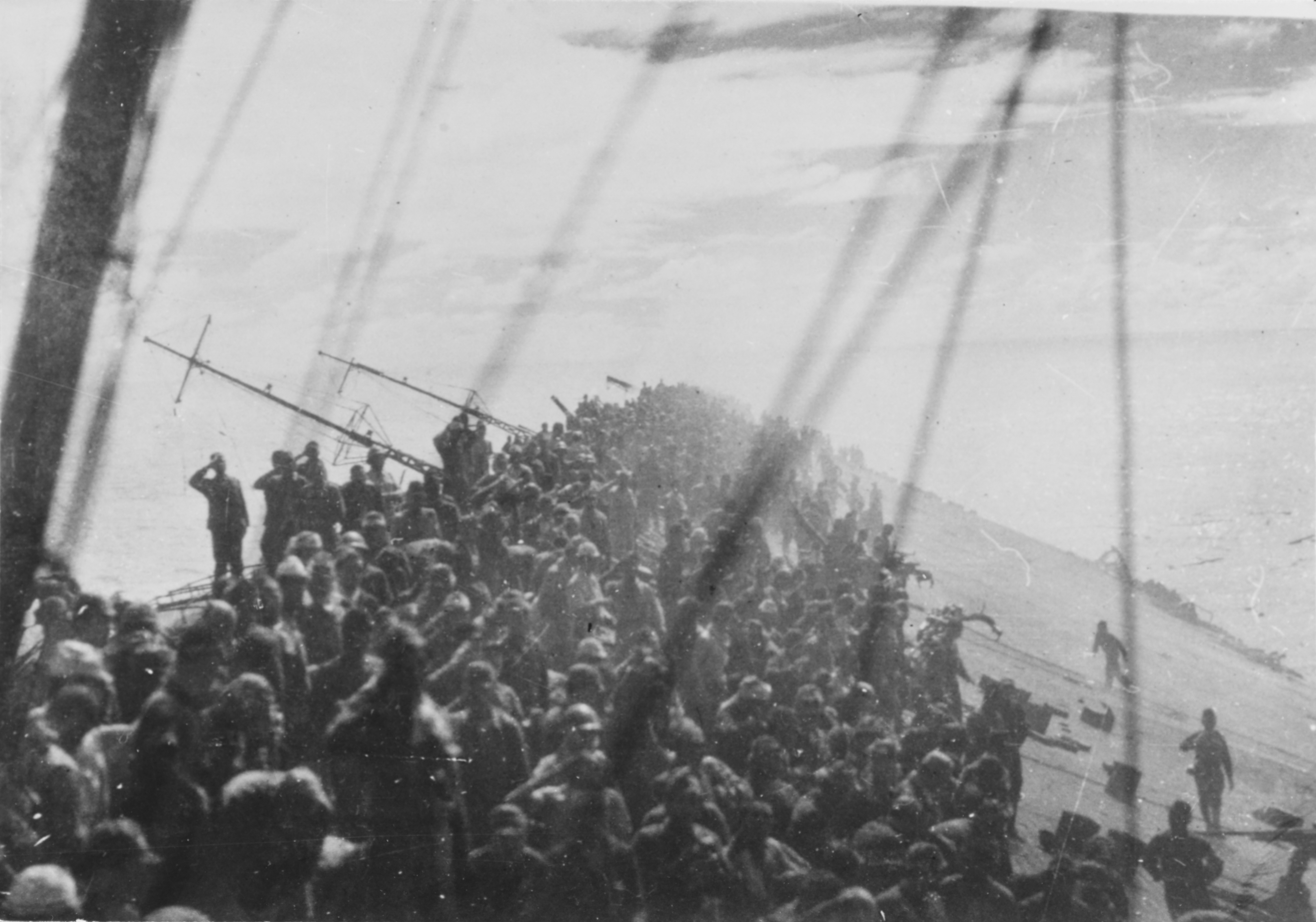
The crew of the sinking Zuikaku salute as the flag is lowered on 25 October 1944.

== Bibliography ==
- Brown, David (1977). WWII Fact Files: Aircraft Carriers. New York: Arco Publishing. ISBN 0-668-04164-1.
- Brown, J. D. (2009). Carrier Operations in World War II. Annapolis, Maryland: Naval Institute Press. ISBN 978-1-59114-108-2.
- Campbell, John (1985). Naval Weapons of World War Two. Annapolis, Maryland: Naval Institute Press. ISBN 0-87021-459-4.
- Chesneau, Roger (1995). Aircraft Carriers of the World, 1914 to the Present: An Illustrated Encyclopedia (New, Revised ed.). Annapolis, Maryland: Naval Institute Press. ISBN 0-87021-902-2.
- Dickson, W. David (1977). "Fighting Flat-tops: The Shokakus". Warship International. XIV (1). International Naval Research Organization: 15–46.
- Gill, G. Hermon (1968). Volume II – Royal Australian Navy, 1942–1945. Australia in the War of 1939–1945, Series 2: Navy. Canberra: Australian War Memorial.
- Jentschura, Hansgeorg; Jung, Dieter & Mickel, Peter (1977). Warships of the Imperial Japanese Navy, 1869–1945. Annapolis, Maryland: United States Naval Institute. ISBN 0-87021-893-X.
- Lengerer, Hans (2014). "The Aircraft Carriers of the Shōkaku Class". In Jordan, John (ed.). Warship 2015. London: Conway. pp. 90–109. ISBN 978-1-84486-276-4.
- Letourneau, Robert & Letourneau, Dennis (2012). Operation KE: The Cactus Air Force and the Japanese Withdrawal From Guadalcanal. Annapolis, Maryland: Naval Institute Press. ISBN 978-1-61251-179-5.
- Lundstrom, John B. (2005a). The First Team: Pacific Naval Air Combat from Pearl Harbor to Midway (New ed.). Annapolis, Maryland: Naval Institute Press. ISBN 1-59114-471-X.
- Lundstrom, John B. (2005b). The First Team and the Guadalcanal Campaign. Annapolis, Maryland: Naval Institute Press. ISBN 1-55750-526-8.
- Peattie, Mark (2001). Sunburst: The Rise of Japanese Naval Air Power 1909–1941. Annapolis, Maryland: Naval Institute Press. ISBN 1-55750-432-6.
- Polmar, Norman & Genda, Minoru (2006). Aircraft Carriers: A History of Carrier Aviation and Its Influence on World Events. Vol. 1, 1909–1945. Washington, D.C.: Potomac Books. ISBN 1-57488-663-0.
- Shores, Christopher; Cull, Brian & Izawa, Yasuho (1992). Bloody Shambles. Vol. I: The Drift to War to the Fall of Singapore. London: Grub Street. ISBN 0-948817-50-X.
- Shores, Christopher; Cull, Brian & Izawa, Yasuho (1993). Bloody Shambles. Vol. II: The Defence of Sumatra to the Fall of Burma. London: Grub Street. ISBN 0-948817-67-4.
- Stille, Mark (2009). The Coral Sea 1942: The First Carrier Battle. Campaign. Vol. 214. Oxford, UK: Osprey Publishing. ISBN 978-1-84908-106-1.
- Stille, Mark (2011). Tora! Tora! Tora:! Pearl Harbor 1941. Raid. Vol. 26. Oxford, UK: Osprey Publishing. ISBN 978-1-84908-509-0.
- Stille, Mark (2007). USN Carriers vs IJN Carriers: The Pacific 1942. Duel. Vol. 6. Oxford, UK: Osprey Publishing. ISBN 978-1-84603-248-6.
- Tully, Anthony P. (September 2010). "IJN Zuikaku: Tabular Record of Movement". Kido Butai. Combinedfleet.com.
- Zimm, Alan D. (2011). Attack on Pearl Harbor: Strategy, Combat, Myths, Deceptions. Havertown, Pennsylvania: Casemate Publishers. ISBN 978-1-61200-010-7.
