= Paul H. Ramsey =

Paul Hubert Ramsey
- Born: February 2, 1905; Springfield, Ohio
- Died: February 15, 1982 (aged 77); Coronado, California
- Military career
- Allegiance: United States of America
- Branch: United States Navy
- Service years: 1927–1966
- Rank: Vice Admiral
- Nickname: Sheik
- Commands: Fighting Squadron 2 (VF-2)
- Conflicts: World War II: Battle of the Coral Sea; Korean War
- Awards: Navy Cross

Paul Hubert Ramsey was an American naval officer. During World War II he was a naval aviator of the United States Navy (USN) who fought in the Battle of the Coral Sea. During the Korean War he was initially the commander of the USS Philippine Sea before becoming air warfare director for the chief of naval operations. He ultimately became commander of the Task Force 77 and rose to the rank of Vice Admiral.

== Early career ==
Ramsey graduated from the United States Naval Academy in 1927 and earned his wings in 1930. During the 1930s, he served on the carriers Lexington and Saratoga. He was promoted to lieutenant commander on 1 July 1941 and became commanding officer of Fighting Squadron 2 (VF-2) aboard Lexington. During the early stages of the Pacific War, his executive officer was Lieutenant James Flatley. They both participated in the Battle of the Coral Sea in May 1942, although Flatley had been transferred to Fighter Squadron 42 (VF-42) just prior to the battle, and so was serving aboard the Yorktown.

== Coral Sea ==
On 7 May, Lieutenant Commander Ramsey led a division of Grumman F4F Wildcat fighters escorting Douglas TBD Devastators from Torpedo Squadron 2 (VT-2) in the attack that sank the light carrier Shōhō. In response to the sinking of Shōhō, the Imperial Japanese Navy (IJN) main carrier force launched a night strike on the US carriers composed of 15 Nakajima B5N and 12 Aichi D3A bombers. Ramsey led a group of F4F Wildcats to intercept. He set up an ambush in heavily overcast weather, which resulted in numerous losses of IJN aircraft and some of their most experienced pilots. He personally destroyed two B5N torpedo bombers, although he claimed them as Zeros.

The following day, on 8 May, Lieutenant Commander Ramsey was involved in Combat Air Patrol over the US carriers. His division of F4F Wildcats spotted an approaching formation of D3A dive bombers at a higher altitude. However, they were unable to climb in time to intercept, due to the poor climb rate of F4F Wildcat and relatively high altitude difference. After the enemy dive bombers made their attack on the US carriers, he and his wingman spotted a Mitsubishi A6M Zero (which he thought was an Me 109) at a lower altitude and dived on it. They hit the Zero, but it managed to escape into a cloud. Moments later, Ramsey spotted another lone Zero, which he claimed shot down (though no Zeros were actually lost).

== Later career ==
After the Coral Sea, he returned to Washington, D.C., where, in April 1943, he was appointed director of the flight test division at the Anacostia Naval Air Station. During the Korean War he was initially the commander of the USS Philippine Sea before becoming air warfare director for the chief of naval operations. He ultimately became commander of the Task Force 77 and rose to the rank of Vice Admiral.
