= USS Neosho (AO-48) =

Oiler of the United States Navy

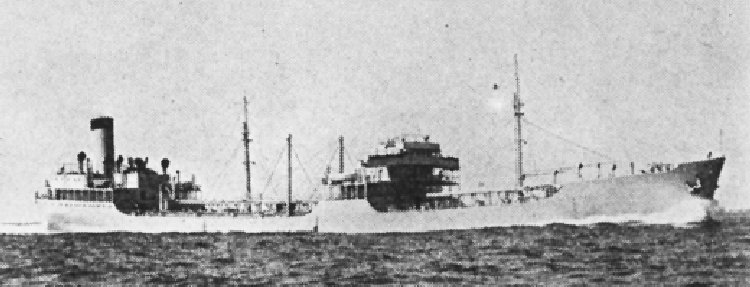

History

United States
- Name: USS Neosho
- Namesake: Neosho River
- Builder: Bethlehem Sparrows Point Shipyard
- Laid down: 8 July 1941
- Launched: 23 December 1941
- Acquired: 4 August 1942
- Commissioned: 16 September 1942
- Decommissioned: 13 December 1945
- Stricken: 3 January 1946
- Honors and awards: 13 battle stars (World War II)
- Fate: Returned to the Maritime Commission, 30 June 1946; Sold, 1947; Scrapped, February 1964

General characteristics
- Class & type: Mattaponi class oiler
- Type: MARAD T2-A
- Tonnage: 16,400 DWT
- Displacement: 21,750 tons
- Length: 520 ft (160 m)
- Beam: 68 ft (21 m)
- Draft: 29 ft 11.5 in (9.131 m)
- Depth: 37 ft (11 m)
- Installed power: 12,000 shp (8,900 kW)
- Propulsion: geared steam turbine; single screw
- Speed: 16.5 knots (30.6 km/h)
- Range: 7,200 nmi (13,300 km; 8,300 mi)
- Capacity: 133,000 bbl (~18,100 t)
- Complement: 214
- Armament: 1 × single 5"/38 caliber dual purpose guns; 4 × single 3"/50 caliber dual purpose guns; 12 × 20 mm Oerlikons

USS Neosho (AO–48) was a Kennebec-class type T2 fleet oiler of the United States Navy. The ship was laid down on 8 July 1941, as SS Catawba, by the Bethlehem-Sparrows Point Shipyard Inc., Sparrows Point, Maryland. The purchase came under Maritime Commission contract number 145 for the Socony-Vacuum Oil Company, later renamed Mobil Oil.

The ship was launched on 23 December 1941, sponsored by Mrs. Wilbur F. Burt. On 18 July 1942 she was renamed Neosho after the sinking of her namesake (AO-23) during the Battle of the Coral Sea. She was acquired by the Navy at San Francisco on 4 August 1942. She was converted by the Bethlehem Steel Co., Union Works, San Francisco; and commissioned on 16 September 1942, Comdr. Frank L. Worden in command.

== Service history ==
=== 1942–1943 ===
The Neosho, (the third US Navy ship to bear the name), with a cargo capacity of 135,000 barrels (21,500 m^{3}), immediately took up her duties of delivering oil, the life blood of the warship, when and where it was needed. Attached to Service Squadron 8 (ServRon 8), she conducted shuttle runs along the West Coast and to Hawaii until 3 December when she sailed for Samoa. From Samoa she continued on to Suva, thence to Espiritu Santo where she served as station tanker, occasionally deploying for fueling at sea operations, until 26 March 1943. Neosho then returned to San Pedro for repairs.

On 28 April the tanker departed California for Dutch Harbor, Alaska. Arriving on 5 May, she sailed again the next day for Adak whence she operated throughout the Aleutian Islands Campaign. After that campaign Neosho returned to the South Pacific, departing Pearl Harbor on 10 November with Task Force 50, to refuel and replenish Task Groups 50.2 and 50.3 prior to the Gilbert and Marshall Islands campaign. After the bloody, but successful, landings there she joined TU 16.10.11 to fuel TF 53 as it steamed toward the next objective, the Marshall Islands.

=== 1944–1945 ===
By 6 February 1944, when Neosho entered the lagoon, Majuro had been secured and set up as a base of operations. From there AO–48 sailed to fuel and provision the ships at sea as strikes were conducted at Hollandia. The Western Carolines fell next and Ulithi became Neosho's new base of operations. From there she supported the vessels of TFs 50 and 58 as they helped secure the Marianas and blocked the enemy's efforts to open aerial and maritime lanes to carry reinforcements and supplies to the defenders of their constantly receding empire.

On 26 August Neosho arrived at Manus whence she supplied the fleet as land forces secured the southern Palaus and invaded the Philippines at Leyte. In December 1944, and January 1945, she fueled and provisioned the fast carrier forces in the South China Sea and the Western Pacific as those forces hit Japanese installations, and shipping, on, and along, the Asiatic mainland, in the Central and Northern Philippines, on Formosa, and in the Ryukyus to prevent reinforcements from reaching the Japanese fighting on Mindoro and Luzon.

Neosho continued to support TF 58 through the Iwo Jima campaign after which she returned to San Pedro, arriving on 30 April for overhaul. On 16 May equipped with new surface and air sweep radar and radar controlled guns, she departed Southern California. On 7 June she arrived at Ulithi, whence she shuttled fuel to, and replenished ships at sea off, Okinawa until the end of the war, on 15 August.

In October, Neosho was ordered back to the United States and on 21 November she reported to Com5 for inactivation.

=== Decommissioning and sale ===
Decommissioned on 13 December 1945, she was stricken from the Naval Vessel Register on 3 January 1946 and turned over to the Maritime Commission for disposal on 30 June 1946. Neosho was sold in 1947 to the Socony-Vacuum Oil Company, and renamed SS Tascalusa, then to Ascalusa in 1963, the ship was finally scrapped in February 1964.
