= Aichi D3A =

Imperial Japanese carrier-borne dive bomber

D3A
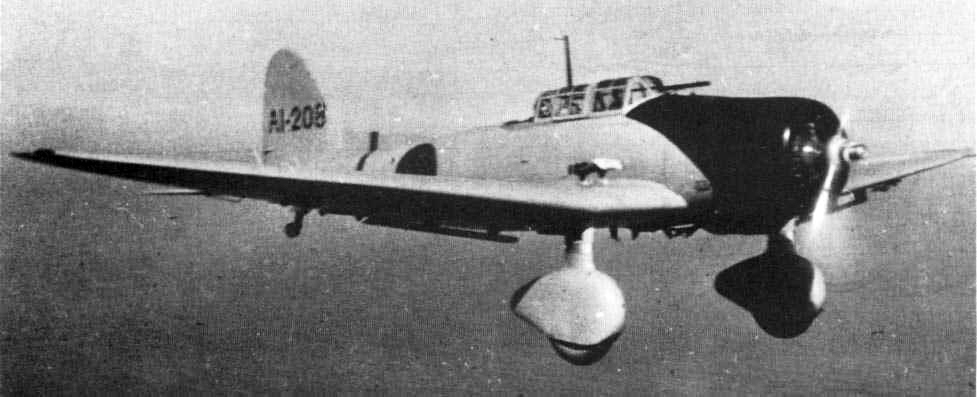
- Aichi D3A1 from carrier Akagi

General information
- Type: Carrier-based dive bomber
- Manufacturer: Aichi Kokuki KK
- Primary user: Imperial Japanese Navy Air Service
- Number built: 1,495 (479 D3A1) (1016 D3A2)

History
- Introduction date: 1940
- First flight: January 1938
- Retired: 1945
- Developed into: Yokosuka D3Y Myōjo

The Aichi D3A (Navy full designation "Type 99 Carrier Bomber"; Allied reporting name "Val") (Note: This code name was applied mid-to-late 1943; more often the D3A was referred to as the "Type 99 navy dive bomber" by Allied forces.) is a carrier-borne dive bomber designed and produced by Aichi Kokuki KK. It was the primary dive bomber of the Imperial Japanese Navy (IJN) during World War II and thus was involved in almost all IJN actions during the conflict, including the attack on Pearl Harbor. The type sank more Allied warships than any other Axis aircraft.

The D3A was developed on behalf of the Imperial Japanese Navy (IJN) as a replacement for its D1A biplane. The designers opted for an elliptical wing configuration as well as for fixed landing gear. In January 1938, the prototype performed its maiden flight. Early test flights were disappointing due to the aircraft being underpowered and demonstrating instability, leading to the second aircraft being extensively modified to improve performance. The stability issue was resolved fully through the addition of a long dorsal fin-strake on the rear fuselage while more powerful engines were adopted along with other changes, such as stronger dive brakes. Having been suitably satisfied by the refined aircraft, the IJN ordered it into production as the Navy Type 99 Carrier Bomber Model 11 in December 1939. Entering service with the Imperial Japanese Navy Air Service (IJNAS) in 1940, the D3A quickly displaced the older D1A from frontline service. It was deployed on many of the IJN's carriers, including the Akagi, Kaga, Ryūjō, Shōkaku, Zuikaku, Shōhō, Zuihō, Chitose, and Chiyoda.

The D3A made its combat debut during the Second Sino-Japanese War, participating in the Bombing of Chongqing and the invasion of Indochina as well. The type was a key element of the service's inventory at the start of World War II, being the first Japanese aircraft to bomb American targets in the conflict, commencing with Pearl Harbor and U.S. bases in the Philippines, such as Clark Air Force Base. In the Pacific theatre, D3As often coordinated their attacks upon enemy shipping with Nakajima B5N torpedo bombers. In 1942, the type contributed to sinking of three US fleet carriers: Lexington at the Battle of the Coral Sea, Yorktown at the Battle of Midway and Hornet at the Battle of the Santa Cruz Islands. Furthermore, due to their high manoeuvrability, the D3A was occasionally used in the interceptor role. Following the introduction of the newer Yokosuka D4Y Suisei dive bomber, the D3A was increasingly deployed from land bases or from smaller carriers. During the Liberation of the Philippines in 1944, land-based D3A2s participated but suffered heavy losses. In the final year of the conflict, numerous aircraft were expended on kamikaze missions.

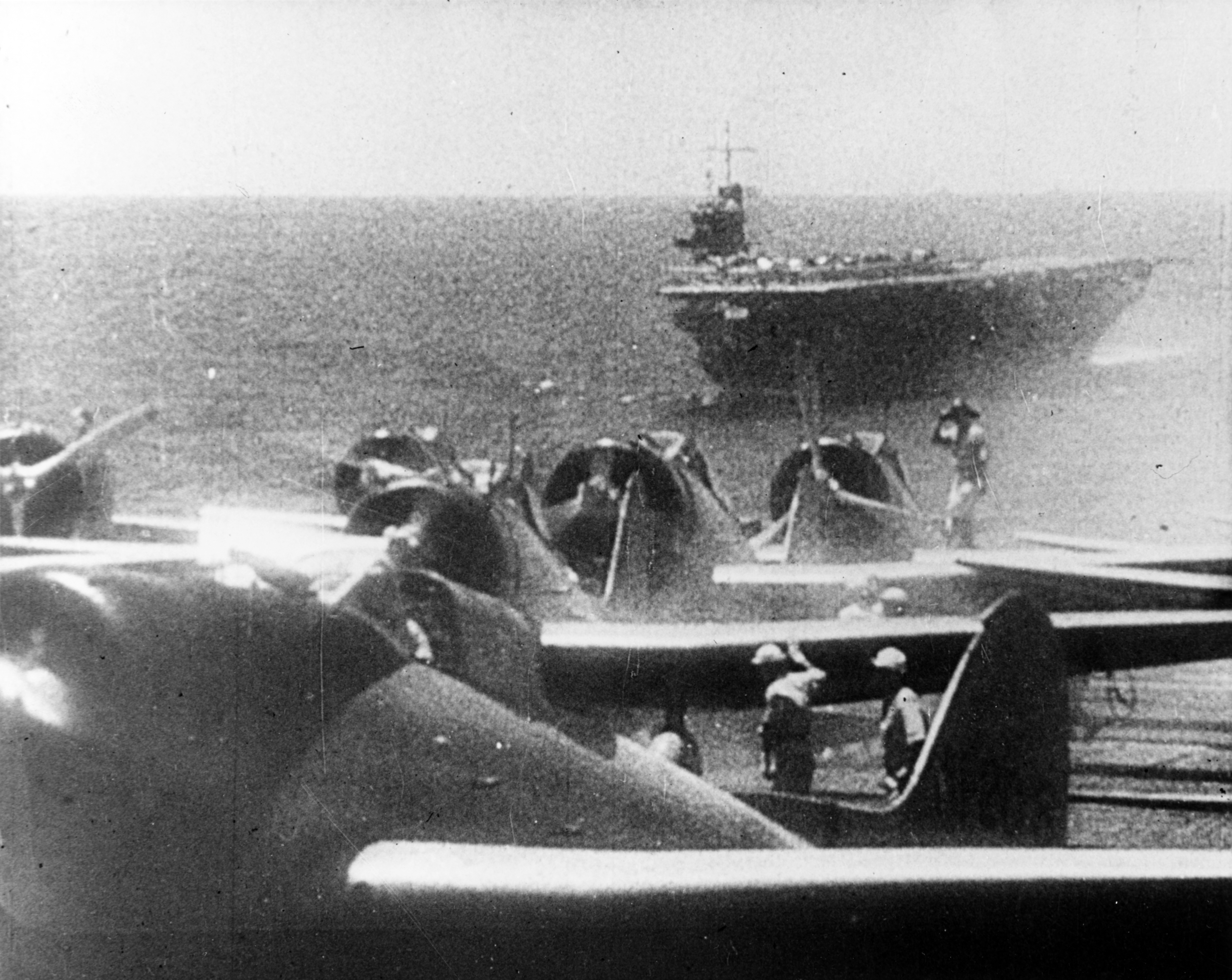
Aichi D3A1 dive bombers prepare to take off from a Japanese aircraft carrier during the morning of 7 December 1941 to attack Pearl Harbor.

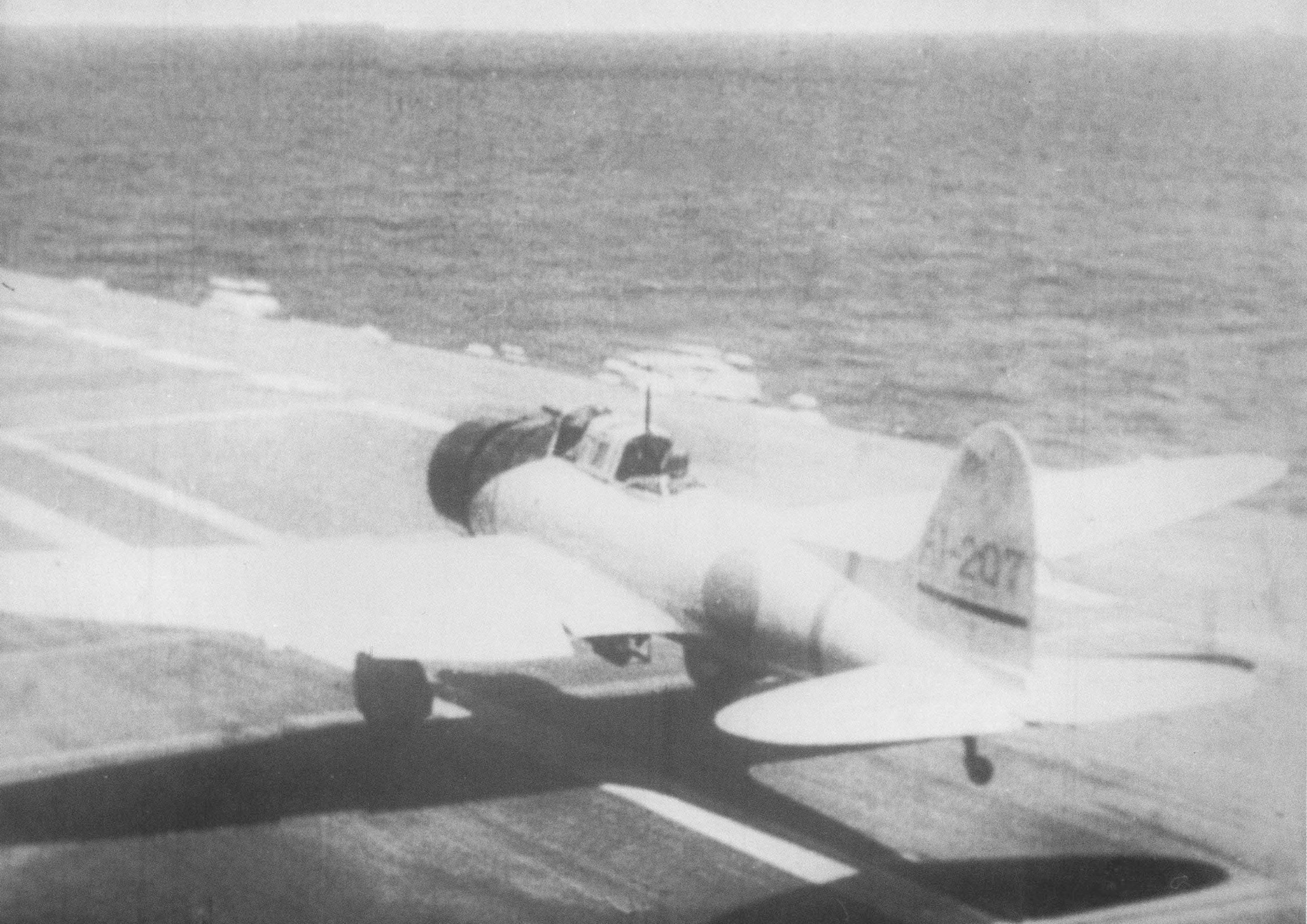
Aichi D3A1 taking off from the carrier Akagi during the Indian Ocean Raid.

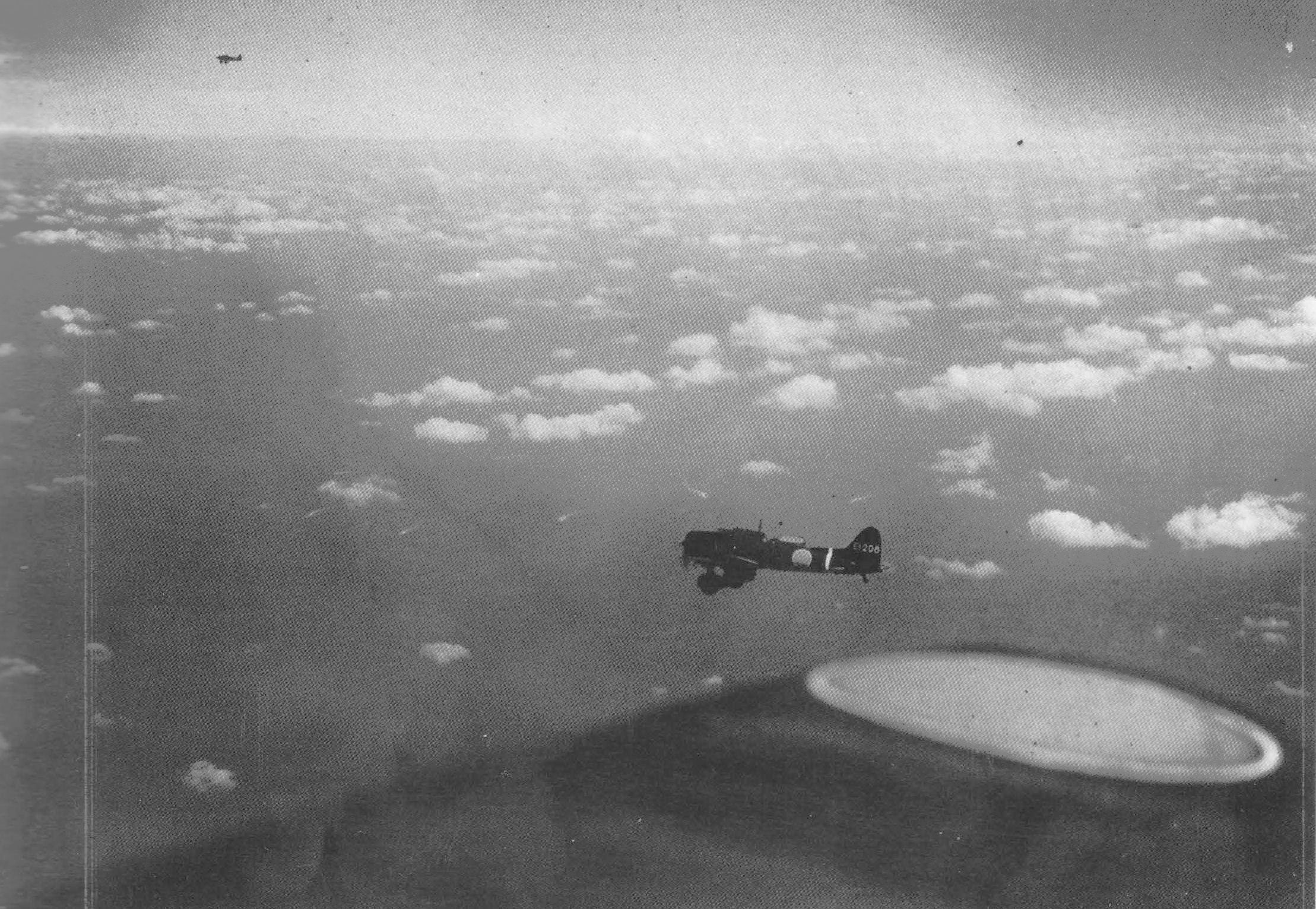
Aichi D3A1s from the carrier Shōkaku during the Battle of the Coral Sea.

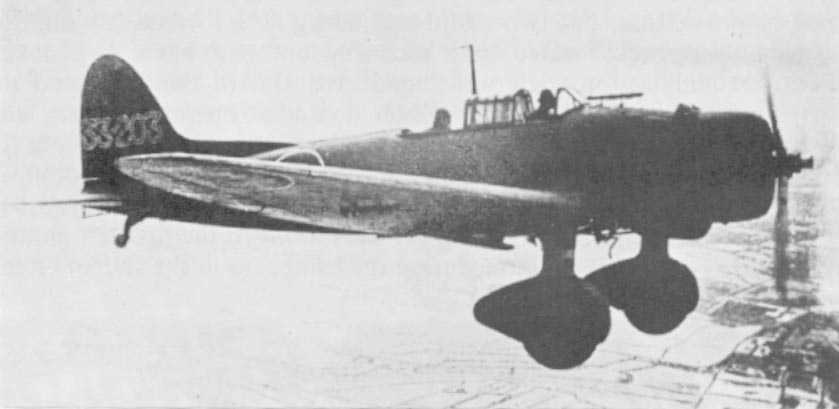
Aichi D3A1 of 33rd Air Group over eastern Java in early summer 1942.

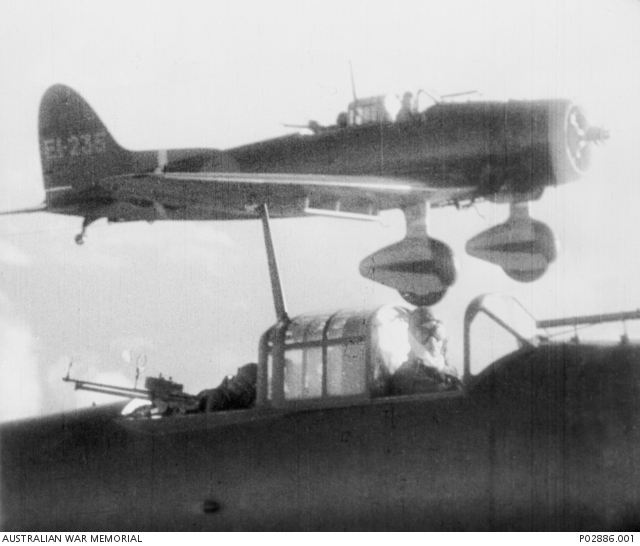
Aichi D3A1s from Shōkaku return to their carrier after attacking the U.S. carrier Enterprise during the Battle of the Eastern Solomons in August 1942.

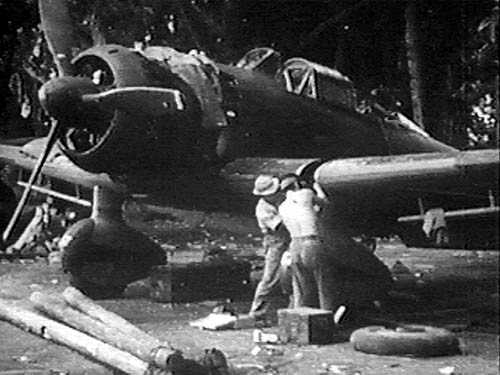
Aichi D3A2 during maintenance. Note the propeller spinner, which is missing from the D3A1s in the previous photos.

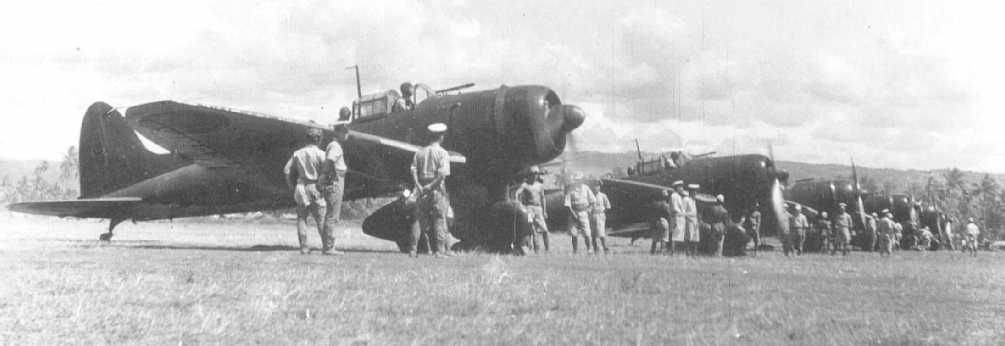
Aichi D3A2 with a telescopic sight, before takeoff.

== Design and development ==
In the summer of 1936, the Imperial Japanese Navy (IJN) issued the 11-Shi specification for a monoplane carrier-based dive bomber to replace the existing D1A biplane then in service. Several Japanese aircraft manufacturers, including Aichi, Nakajima, and Mitsubishi, opted to submit responses. Of these, Aichia and Nakajima were subsequently contracted to produce two prototypes each.

Aichi's design team, headed by Tokuhishiro Goake, produced a monoplane with low-mounted elliptical wings, a configuration that had been allegedly inspired by the Heinkel He 70 Blitz, the first of Germany's Schnellbombers. It flew slowly enough that the drag produced by the landing gear was not a serious issue, thus a fixed spatted landing gear arrangement was used for simplicity, reducing both maintenance and weight. (Note: The D3A was the final Japanese carrier-based aircraft to use spatted fixed landing gear.) As originally designed, the aircraft was to be powered by the 529 kW (709 hp) Nakajima Hikari 1 nine-cylinder radial engine.

In December 1937, the first prototype was completed and flight trials commenced one month later, after which it was designated as D3A1. The initial test flights were underwhelming due to the aircraft being underpowered and suffering from directional instability during wide turns, while in tighter turns it tended to snap roll. Furthermore, the dive brakes vibrated heavily when extended at their design speed of 200 knots (370 km/h) while the IJN was already requesting the aircraft to have a faster diving speed of 240 knots (440 km/h) There were some positive results obtained with the first prototype, such as its overall handling characteristics being satisfactory.

To address the identified shortfalls, the second aircraft was extensively modified prior to delivery. Specifically, power was increased by replacing the Hikari with the 626 kW (839 hp) Mitsubishi Kinsei 3 in a redesigned cowling, and the vertical tail was enlarged to help with the directional instability. The wings were slightly larger in span and the outer sections of the leading edges had wash-out to counteract the snap rolls, and strengthened dive brakes were fitted. During the competitive flight trials against the rival Nakajima D3N1, these changes were proved to have rectified all of the problems except the directional instability, which convinced IJN officials to favour Aichi's design.

In December 1939, the IJN ordered the aircraft as the Navy Type 99 Carrier Bomber Model 11 (kanjō bakugekiki, usually abbreviated to 艦爆 kanbaku.). The production models featured slightly smaller wings and increased power due to the adoption of either the 746 kW (1,000 hp) Kinsei 43 or 798 kW (1,070 hp) Kinsei 44. The directional instability problem was finally fully resolved via the fitting of a lengthy dorsal fin-strake, which started midway down the rear fuselage, and the aircraft actually became highly maneuverable.

In June 1942, an improved version of D3A1, powered by a 969 kW (1,299 hp) Kinsei 54, was tested and designated as D3A2 or the Model 12. The extra power reduced range, so the design was further modified with additional fuel tanks to bring the total tankage to 900 L (240 US gal), giving it the range needed to fight effectively over the Solomon Islands. Known to the Navy as the Model 22, it began to replace the Model 11 in front-line units in the autumn of 1942, and most Model 11s were then sent to training units. While some late production models of D3A1 were fitted with a propeller spinner, it became a standard with D3A2.

== Equipment and conventions ==
The pilot position was equipped with a Type 95 telescopic gunsight in the earlier models and a Type 99 in the later models, which were used for aiming the bomb during the dive. The observer/navigator position was equipped with a Type 97 Mk1 drift sight, which was a long vertical tube located in the front-left of the observer's seat. In addition, the observer position was equipped with a drift meter that was mounted on the floor in the front-right of the observer's seat. The observer also operated a Type 96 Mk2 radio set that was mounted in front of the observer's seat and behind the pilot's seat. On top of the radio set was a Type 3 reflector compass for precise navigation.

Armament comprised a pair of fixed forward-firing 7.7 mm (0.303 in) Type 97 machine guns, and one flexible 7.7 mm (.303 in) Type 92 machine gun at the rear end of the cockpit, which was operated by the observer. A typical bomb load consisted of a single 250 kg bomb (e.g., Type 99 No 25 semi-AP or Type 98 No 25 land bomb) carried under the fuselage, swung out under the propeller on release by a trapeze; two additional 60 kg bombs (e.g., Type 99 No 6 semi-AP or Type 2 No 6 land bomb) could be carried on wing racks located under each wing outboard of the dive brakes.

Initially, D3A dive bombers were painted in silver. During the summer of 1941, the paint finish changed to light olive grey. The color changed again in early 1942 to dark green.

An individual D3A dive bomber was commanded by the senior ranking crew member aboard, which could be the observer rather than the pilot. This was in contrast to the United States Navy, where the pilot was almost always the commander of a dive bomber. For example, Petty Officer First Class Kiyoto Furuta was serving as a pilot to Lieutenant Takehiko Chihaya during the attack on Pearl Harbor, and later on to Lieutenant Keiichi Arima during the two carrier battles of the Solomon Islands campaign, both of whom were observers.

== Operational history ==
The D3A1 first saw combat operation in November 1939, one month prior to its official acceptance as the Navy Type 99 dive bomber. Nakajima sent several examples to the 14th Air group operating at Haikou on Hainan island in South China. These D3A1s were commanded by Lieutenant Sadamu Takahashi and supported the Imperial Japanese Army (IJA) in the capture of Nanning, which was intended to cut the supplies coming from French Indochina. After the capture of Nanning, they continued to be operated in the area in 1940. In May 1940, 12th Air Group became the second front-line unit to be equipped with the new D3A1 dive bombers. They first participated in the capture of Yichang and conducted anti-shipping operations on the Yangtze River, west of Yichang, in order to cut the Chinese supplies coming from Chongqing. In September, D3A1s from the 12th Air Group started to fly missions against Chongqing, which was the Chinese capital at the time. After the invasion of Indochina in autumn 1940, 14th Air Group operated at Hanoi and flew missions against Kunming and the Burma Road.

The D3A1 commenced carrier qualification trials aboard the aircraft carriers Akagi and Kaga during 1940, while a small number of aircraft made their combat debut from land bases over China. By December 1941, the type had displaced the older D1A from frontline combat duties entirely.

The type was a key component of the IJN's attack on Pearl Harbor, during which 126 D3A1s were engaged. Thereafter, it participated in all major Japanese carrier operations in the first ten months of the conflict. They achieved their first major success against the Royal Navy during their Indian Ocean raid in April 1942; during this operation, the D3A1 reportedly achieved an 82 percent on-target rate with their bombs during attacks on two heavy cruisers and an aircraft carrier.

Prior to the Indian Ocean raid, the established doctrine regarding attacks against ships was to arm all D3A1 dive bombers with semi-AP bombs. On 5 April 1942, an IJN carrier force attacked Colombo on Ceylon with half of its complement, while the other half was kept in reserve for strikes against ships. Since a second strike against Colombo was deemed necessary, the dive bombers of the reserve force were rearmed from semi-AP bombs to land bombs. When British heavy cruisers were spotted soon afterwards, the reserve force was sent with a portion of D3A1 dive bombers armed with land bombs. In the subsequent attack, land bombs unintentionally proved very effective in suppressing the anti-aircraft fire from the ships. As a result, the doctrine was modified in order to intentionally equip the first few D3A1 dive bombers with land bombs. This new method was already implemented for the attack that sank HMS Hermes just four days later, and continued to be used from then on.

During 1942, dive bombing attacks by carrier-based D3A1 and D3A2 bombers significantly contributed to sinking of three US fleet carriers: Lexington at the Battle of the Coral Sea, Yorktown at the Battle of Midway and Hornet at the Battle of the Santa Cruz Islands. In addition, they damaged the carrier Enterprise both at the Battle of the Eastern Solomons and at the Battle of the Santa Cruz Islands. Besides carrier-based units, D3A dive bombers also operated from land bases during the Solomon Islands campaign, where they participated in the Guadalcanal campaign, Operation I-Go, Operation SE and Operation RO, and during the New Guinea campaign, where they participated in the Battle of Milne Bay and Battle of Buna–Gona. The main land-based unit to operate D3A dive bombers during these campaigns and battles was the 2nd/582nd Air Group. D3A bombers were among the forerunners of the Japanese air superiority sweeps across New Guinea and the Solomons (Operation I, Operation Y) in April 1943, and on attacks against Milne Bay and Port Moresby some were armed with 20mm cannons.

During the course of the war, D3A dive bombers often combined their attacks upon enemy warships with the IJN Nakajima B5N Kate torpedo bomber; consequently, enemy vessels were often sunk by a combination strike of bombs and torpedoes. However, there were occasions when just the D3As made the attacks, or at least scored the sinking hits. Discounting the Pearl Harbor strike, which also used the B5N for level bombing and torpedo attacks, D3A dive bombers were credited with directly sinking the following Allied warships (partial list):

- USS Arizona, American Battleship, 7 December 1941 – Pearl Harbor, Hawaii
- USS Downes, American Destroyer, 7 December 1941 – Pearl Harbor, Hawaii
- USS Cassin, American Destroyer, 7 December 1941 – Pearl Harbor, Hawaii
- MV Herstein, Norwegian freighter, 20 January 1942 – Rabaul, Simpson Harbor
- SS Westralia, Australian Coal Ship, 20 January 1942 – Rabaul, Simpson Harbor
- USS Peary, American destroyer, 19 February 1942 – Australia (Darwin)
- USS Pope, American destroyer, 1 March 1942 – Java Sea
- USS Edsall, American destroyer, 1 March 1942- Indian Ocean
- USS Pecos, American oiler, 1 March 1942- Indian Ocean
- HMS Cornwall, British heavy cruiser, 5 April 1942 – Indian Ocean
- HMS Dorsetshire, British heavy cruiser, 5 April 1942 – Indian Ocean
- HMS Hector, British armed merchant cruiser, 5 April 1942 – Indian Ocean
- HMS Tenedos, British destroyer, 5 April 1942 – Indian Ocean
- HMS Hermes, British aircraft carrier, 9 April 1942 – Indian Ocean
- RFA Athelstone, British freighter, 9 April 1942 - Indian Ocean
- HMS Hollyhock, British corvette, 9 April 1942 - Indian Ocean
- SS British Sergeant, British Tanker, 9 April 1942 - Indian Ocean
- SS Norviken, Norwegian Cargo Ship, 9 April 1942 - Indian Ocean
- HMAS Vampire, Australian destroyer, 9 April 1942 – Indian Ocean
- USS Sims, American destroyer, 7 May 1942 – Pacific Ocean
- USS De Haven, American destroyer, 1 February 1943 – Pacific Ocean (Ironbottom Sound)
- USS Aaron Ward, American destroyer, 7 April 1943 – Pacific Ocean (off Tulagi)
- HMNZS Moa, New Zealand Minesweeper, 7 April 1943 – Pacific Ocean (off Tulagi)
- USS Kanawha, American oiler, 8 April 1943 – Pacific Ocean (Tulagi, Solomon Islands)
- MS Van Heemskerk, Dutch Transport Ship, 14 April 1943 – Milne Bay, Papua New Guinea
- USS Brownson, American destroyer, 26 December 1943 – Pacific Ocean
- USS Abner Read, American destroyer, sunk by kamikaze 1 November 1944 – Pacific Ocean
- USS William D. Porter, American destroyer, sunk by kamikaze 10 June 1945 – Japan (Okinawa)

As the conflict progressed, there were instances when the dive bombers were pressed into duty as fighters in the interceptor role, their maneuverability being enough to allow them to survive in this role. When the Yokosuka D4Y Suisei became available, the D3A2s were increasingly operated by land-based units or operating from the smaller carriers, which were too small to handle the fast-landing Suisei. When American forces invaded the Philippines in 1944, land-based D3A2s took part in the fighting but were hopelessly outdated and losses were heavy. By this point of the war, the majority of D3A1s and D3A2s were being operated by training units in Japan, and several were modified with dual controls as Navy Type 99 Bomber Trainer Model 12s (D3A2-K).

During the last year of the war, as Japan's declining military position became increasingly apparent, many of the remaining D3A2s were pressed back into combat for kamikaze missions. While costly to conduct in terms of both manpower and material, such attacks did not prove to be particularly effective.

== Operators ==
Japan

- Imperial Japanese Navy Air Service

== Surviving aircraft ==
A D3A2 is currently under restoration at the Planes of Fame Museum in Chino, California. There are two unrestored D3As on display at the National Museum of the Pacific War in Fredericksburg, Texas. In 2022, the Pearl Harbor Aviation Museum began acquiring the remains of a D3A from Papua New Guinea for eventual exhibit.

== Specifications (D3A2 Model 22) ==
Aichi D3A1 3-view drawing

Data from Japanese Aircraft of the Pacific War

General characteristics

- Crew: 2
- Length: 10.195 m (33 ft 5 in)
- Wingspan: 14.365 m (47 ft 2 in)
- Height: 3.847 m (12 ft 7 in)
- Wing area: 34.9 m^{2} (376 sq ft)
- Empty weight: 2,570 kg (5,666 lb)
- Gross weight: 3,800 kg (8,378 lb)
- Powerplant: 1 × Mitsubishi Kinsei 54 14-cylinder air-cooled radial piston engine, 970 kW (1,300 hp) for take-off

1,200 hp (890 kW) at 3,000 m (9,800 ft)
1,100 hp (820 kW) at 6,200 m (20,300 ft)

- Propellers: 3-bladed metal constant-speed propeller

Performance

- Maximum speed: 430 km/h (270 mph, 230 kn) at 6,200 m (20,300 ft)
- Cruise speed: 296 km/h (184 mph, 160 kn) at 3,000 m (9,800 ft)
- Range: 1,352 km (840 mi, 730 nmi)
- Service ceiling: 10,500 m (34,400 ft)
- Time to altitude: 3,000 m (9,800 ft) in five minutes and 48 seconds
- Wing loading: 108.9 kg/m^{2} (22.3 lb/sq ft)
- Power/mass: 3.9 kg/kW (6.4 lb/hp)

Armament

- Guns: 2 × forward-firing 7.7 mm (0.303 in) Type 97 aircraft machine guns in the forward fuselage upper decking + 1 × 7.7 mm (0.303 in) Type 92 machine gun on a flexible mount in the rear cockpit
- Bombs: 1 × 250 kg (550 lb) under the fuselage and 2 × 60 kg (130 lb) bombs under the wings

== See also ==
Aircraft of comparable role, configuration, and era

- ANBO VIII
- Blackburn Skua
- Breda Ba.65
- Curtiss SB2C Helldiver
- Douglas SBD Dauntless
- Fairey Barracuda
- Junkers Ju 87
- Loire-Nieuport LN.401
- Saab 17
- Vultee A-31 Vengeance
- Yokosuka D3Y
- Yokosuka D4Y

Related lists

- List of aircraft of World War II
- List of bomber aircraft
- List of military aircraft of Japan
