= USS Sims (DD-409) =

Sims-class destroyer

Coordinates: 15.1667°S 158.0833°E

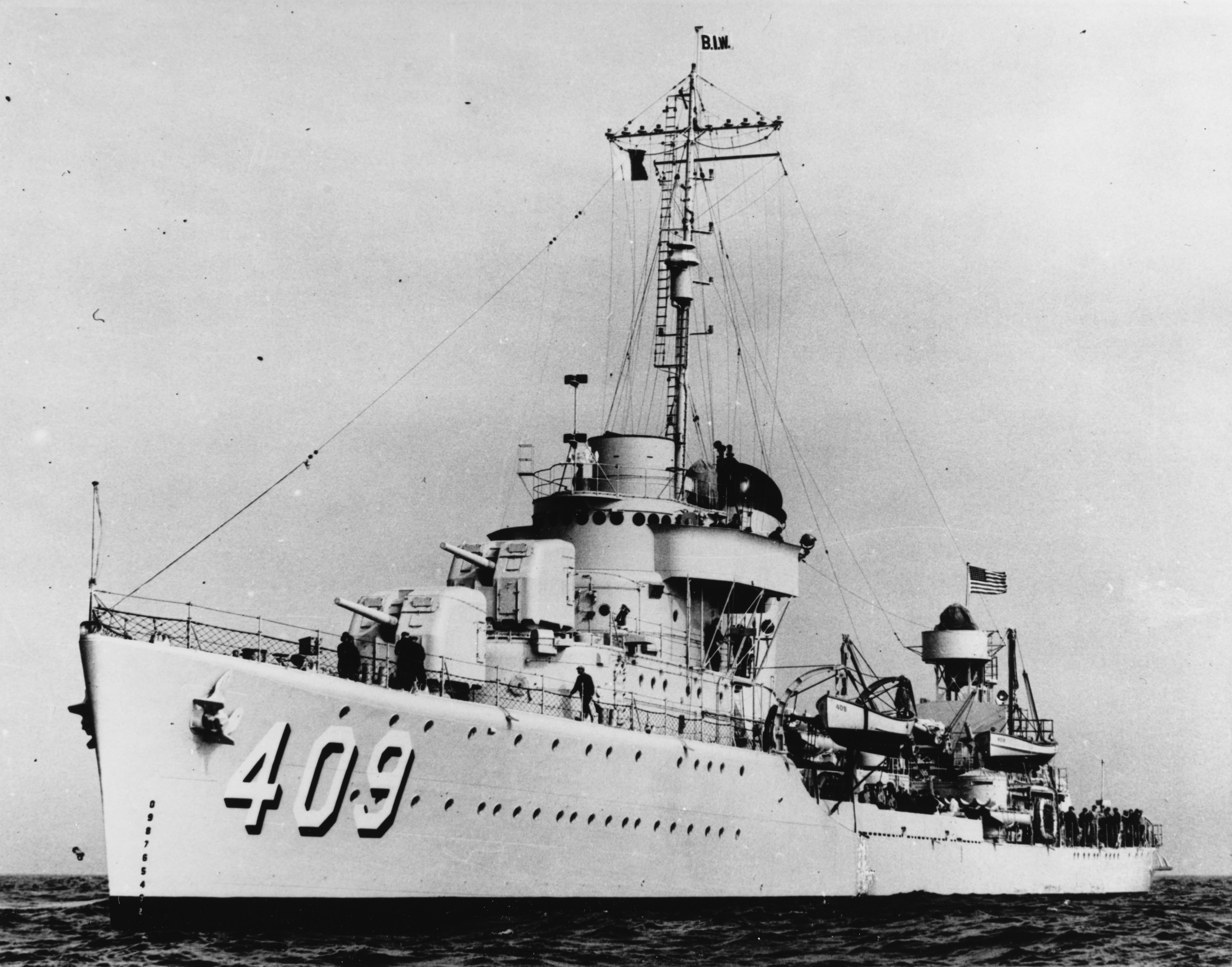
- USS Sims (DD-409)

History

United States
- Builder: Bath Iron Works
- Laid down: 15 July 1937
- Launched: 8 April 1939
- Sponsored by: Mrs. William S. Sims
- Commissioned: 1 August 1939
- Stricken: 24 June 1942
- Fate: Sunk by Japanese aircraft in Battle of Coral Sea on 7 May 1942

General characteristics
- Class & type: Sims-class destroyer
- Displacement: 1,570 long tons (1,600 t) (std); 2,211 long tons (2,246 t) (full)
- Length: 348 ft 3 1/4 in (106.2 m)
- Beam: 36 ft 1 in (11.0 m)
- Draft: 13 ft 4.5 in (4.1 m)
- Propulsion: High-pressure super-heated boilers; Geared turbines with twin screws; 50,000 hp (37,000 kW)
- Speed: 35 knots (65 km/h; 40 mph)
- Range: 3,660 nmi (6,780 km; 4,210 mi) at 20 kn (37 km/h; 23 mph)
- Complement: 192 (10 officers/182 enlisted)
- Armament: 5 × 5 inch/38, in single mounts; 4 × .50 caliber/90, in single mounts; 8 × 21 inch torpedo tubes in two quadruple mounts; 2 × depth charge track, 10 depth charges
- Armor: None

USS Sims (DD-409) was the lead ship of her class of destroyers in the United States Navy during World War II. She was the first ship to be named for William Sims, an Admiral who pushed for the modernization of the Navy.

== Construction and commissioning ==
Sims was laid down on 15 July 1937 by Bath Iron Works Corporation in Bath, Maine. She was launched on 8 April 1939, sponsored by Mrs. Anne Erwin Sims, and commissioned on 1 August 1939.

== Service history ==
=== Inter-War Period ===
After shakedown training in the Caribbean and post-shakedown availability in the Boston Navy Yard, Sims joined the Atlantic Squadron at Norfolk, Virginia on 2 August 1940. The destroyer operated with the Neutrality Patrol in Caribbean and South Atlantic waters. In November–December 1940, Sims patrolled off Martinique. On 28 May 1941, the ship arrived at Newport, Rhode Island, and began operating from there. She sailed for Iceland on 28 July with an American task force. In August, the destroyer patrolled the approaches to Iceland. In September–October, the ship made two North Atlantic patrols. Sims had been attached to Destroyer Squadron 2 (DesRon 2) since she began making Neutrality Patrols.

=== World War II ===
With the outbreak of war on 7 December 1941, DesRon 2 became part of Task Force 17 (TF17) formed around Yorktown. The task force sortied from Norfolk on 16 December 1941 for San Diego, California. From there, it sailed as part of a convoy taking Marines to Samoa, arriving on 23 January 1942.

At the time, it was believed that the Japanese would attack Samoa to sever Allied communications with Australia. To thwart such a move, a carrier raid against Japanese bases in the Marshall Islands was planned. The Yorktown task force was to strike the islands of Mili, Jaluit, and Makin, while another force centered on Enterprise was to hit Kwajalein, Wotje, and Maloelap.

TF 17 departed Samoa on 25 January, with Sims in the screen. At 1105 on 28 January, she sighted an enemy bomber. At 1114, a stick of four bombs fell approximately 1,500 yards astern, straddling the wake of the destroyer. The next day, the two carrier forces and a bombardment group attacked the islands and withdrew.

Sims, with TF 17, sailed from Pearl Harbor on 16 February to attack Wake Island. Shortly after departing, their sailing orders were changed, and they proceeded to the Canton Island area. Canton is a small island on the Honolulu-New Caledonia air route, and it was thought to be endangered by the Japanese.

By early March, the Japanese had occupied Lae and Salamaua on the north coast of New Guinea. To check this drive, a carrier strike was launched on 10 March from Lexington and Yorktown. Sims remained near Rossel Island in the Louisiade Archipelago with a force of cruisers and destroyers to protect the carriers from enemy surface ships. Sims next operated in the New Caledonia-Tonga Islands area.

==== Battle of the Coral Sea ====
In late April 1942, a Japanese task force was assembled to begin operations in support of Japanese moves towards Australia. This consisted of a covering group to protect landing forces on Tulagi and Port Moresby and a striking force to eliminate Allied shipping in the Coral Sea. Shōhō was attached to the covering force, and Shōkaku and Zuikaku were the striking force under command of Admiral Takeo Takagi. The American ships were divided into task forces centered on Lexington and Yorktown. Sims was ordered to escort USS Neosho. The task force refueled on 5–6 May and then detached Neosho and Sims to continue to the next fueling point.

On the morning of 7 May, a search plane from the Japanese striking force sighted the oiler and destroyer and reported them to Admiral Takagi as a carrier and a cruiser. Takagi ordered an all-out attack. At 0930, 15 high level bombers attacked the two ships but did no damage. At 1038, 10 attacked the destroyer, but skillful maneuvering evaded the nine bombs that were dropped. A third attack against the two ships by 36 Val dive bombers was devastating. Neosho was soon crippled and burning aft as the result of seven direct hits and one plane that dived into her.

Sims was attacked from all directions. The destroyer defended herself as best she could. Three 250-kilogram (551 lb) bombs hit the destroyer. Two exploded in the engine room, and within minutes, the ship buckled amidships and began to sink, stern first. As Sims slid beneath the waves, there was a tremendous explosion that raised what was left of the ship almost 15 feet (4.6 m) out of the water. Chief R. J. Dicken, in a damaged whaleboat, picked up 15 other survivors. They remained with Neosho until they were rescued by Henley on 11 May. Sims was struck from the Naval Vessel Register on 24 June 1942.

== Awards ==
Sims received two battle stars for World War II service.
