= Second Operational Phase (1942) =

Second Operational Phase (第二段作戦 Dainidan Sakusen) (also: Second Operational Stage) refers to the invasion strategy detailed in the Greater East Asia War Second Stage Operation Imperial Navy Operation Plan (大東亜戦争第二段作戦帝国海軍作戦計画), presented to the Emperor of Japan, April 1942, by the Imperial General Headquarters. Whereas the objective of the First Phase (originally called the Southern Strategy) was to capture resource-rich areas of Southeast Asia needed by the Japanese military, the Imperial Japanese Army, having fully backed the First Operational Phase, was reluctant to assign troops to the Second. The objective of the Second Operational Phase was to threaten the supply line from the United States to Australia (Beigo Bundan Sakusen 米豪分断作戦 or Bego Shadan 米豪遮断) by occupying strategic points in eastern Papua New Guinea, New Britain, the Aleutians, Midway, Fiji, and Samoa; occupying these points would also expand Japan's strategic depth. Occupying Hawaii then became a possibility; this, and severance of supply lines between Australia and the United States, offered the hope of early peace negotiations. The territory occupied in the Second Operational Phase could be bartered in exchange for an early end to the war.

== Relation to First Operational Phase ==
The First Operational Phase (Nanpo Sakusen, Southern Operational Phase) ended with the Battle of Rabaul (completed February 1942). Implementation of the Second Operational Phase began with Operation Mo, the occupation of Port Moresby, starting with the occupation of Tulagi on 3 May 1942. The Second Operational Phase was abandoned after Japanese defeats during the Battle of Midway (ending June 7), and the Guadalcanal campaign (ending 9 February 1943); the first initiated a habit of the Imperial General Headquarters Announcement function (Dai Honei Happyo) to declare phantom victories, a process resulting in the term “Dai Honei Happyo” becoming synonymous with government misinformation, and still used ironically in this sense today; and the second was similarly marked by coinage of the term “turn and advance” (tenshin 転進) as a euphemism for “retreat.” The failed Second Operational Phase was replaced by the Third Operational Phase decreed in March, 1943.

The First Operational Phase involved the defeat of the colonial occupying powers of France (French Indo-China), the United Kingdom (Malaya and Singapore), the Netherlands (Dutch East Indies) and the United States (Guam, the Philippines); in contrast, the Second Operational Phase was treated as an existential threat to Australia by the government of John Curtin.

== Inception of Planning ==
The original goals of the Pacific War, largely determined by November 1941 and implemented beginning December 8 (Japan Standard Time), of the Attack on Pearl Harbor, Malayan campaign, occupation of the Philippines, the Dutch East Indies, the occupation of Hong Kong, and the occupation of Rabaul were completed ahead of schedule. This phase of the Pacific War is normally referred to as the Southern Strategy (Nanpo Sakusen 南方作戦), or “Strike South”; but in reference to what follows, it is called “Operational Phase One.” In January 1942, before the completion of Phase One, orders were issued for the invasion of Burma, the Andaman Islands, Port Moresby, and other locations. This created a need to quickly formulate plans.

== Australia-first group ==
Within the Naval General Staff, the most active group was the Australia-first group led by Admiral Sadatoshi Tomioka, Chief of the Plans Division in the First Section (Operations), who held that Australia posed the greatest strategic threat to Japan's newly expanded empire, and also offered much in the way of economic resources. When the idea was introduced to the Imperial Army General Staff in February, the reaction was vehement rejection. The IJA could not spare the ten to twelve infantry divisions required for such a gargantuan operation, these divisions were needed on the Asian mainland. The IJA further argued that Japan lacked the necessary shipping to provision such a force. The Imperial Army had earlier agreed to an invasion of Port Moresby, but only reluctantly, because of the difficulties involved in supplying such a distant outpost.

== Proposal by Tamon Yamaguchi ==
During the research for the Second Operational Phase, an ambitious plan was proposed by Rear Admiral Tamon Yamaguchi, then commander of the 2nd Carrier Division, who had just returned from the successful Indian Ocean raid. Yamaguchi envisioned the following schedule: occupation of bases in India (May); occupation of Fiji, Samoa, New Caledonia, as well as New Zealand and Australia (July); occupation of the Aleutian Islands (August, September); occupation of the Pacific islands of Midway Island, Johnston Atoll, and Palmyra Atoll (November, December); occupation of Hawaii (December 1942 through January 1943); followed by destruction of the Panama Canal and occupation of oil fields in California.

== Imperial Approval ==
In April, 1942, the Greater East Asian War Second Operation Phase Imperial Navy Strategy Document (大東亜戦争第二段作戦帝国海軍作戦計画) was presented to the Throne. On April 28 the Combined Fleet distributed copies of the plan to relevant naval officers. These officers had participated in the study groups for the First Operational Phase, and they had other pressing wartime concerns, so the plan was not studied in depth until map exercises began.

Map exercises were held beginning May 1 on the battleship Yamato, playing out scenarios up to an invasion of Hawaii, with further research on the evening of May 3 and May 4 and discussions on the afternoon of May 4. On May 5 IJN Decree Number 18 (大海令第十八号) was issued and the plan became official.

== Third Operational Phase (1943) ==
The Third Operational Phase, like the Second, was an Imperial Navy undertaking, issued on March 25, 1943, as the Third Phase Imperial Japanese Navy Operation Plan (第三段作戦帝国海軍作戦方針). According to Commander Sanagi Sadamu, then head of the IJN General Staff Operations Bureau, the concept was first to put a stop to aggressive offensive operations on critical points at the periphery of the Co-Prosperity Sphere, and rather to establish a system for long-term possession of strongpoints by hardening defensive preparations for an anticipated Allied counterattack. Secondly, because exclusively relying on defense implies a loss of overwhelming combat strength, the plan should create occasional offensive opportunities, trapping and annihilating enemy forces to eliminate their ability to counterattack. Thirdly, the ostensible main purpose was to establish strategic readiness for "strenuous necessities of the Empire" to come.

== Individual Operations ==
- Operation MO occupation of Port Moresby and Tulagi
- Operation RY occupation of Nauru and Ocean Island
- Operation MI occupation of Midway Island
- Aleutian Islands campaign (Operation AL or AO)
- Operation FS occupation of Fiji, American Samoa, Samoa, and New Caledonia

Note that the construction of an airfield on Guadalcanal was conceived of as a construction project enabled by Operation MO and preparatory to Operation FS; it was not given a unique military operation codename. In contrast, Operation Ke refers to the withdrawal of Japanese troops from Guadalcanal.
