= 3rd Carrier Division =

Third Carrier Division
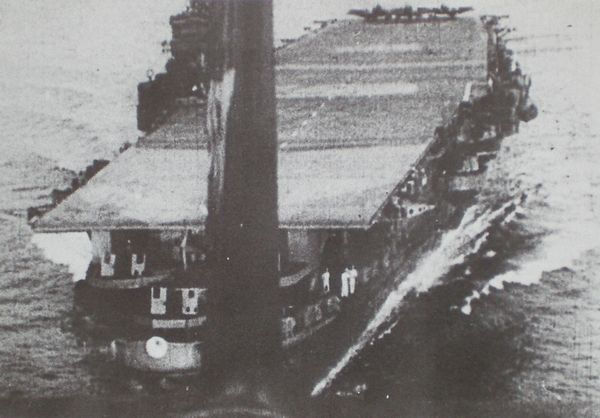
- Zuikaku in Autumn 1944
- Active: June 1, 1936 – November 15, 1944
- Country: Empire of Japan
- Allegiance: Axis Powers of World War II
- Branch: Imperial Japanese Navy
- Type: Naval aviation unit
- Role: Aircraft carrier support
- Engagements: Battle of the Philippine Sea; Battle of Leyte Gulf

Commanders
- Notable commanders: Kakuji Kakuta

Insignia
- Identification symbol: Kamoi; Kamoi (カモヰ); Notoro; Notoro (ノトロ); Zuihō in 1941-42; CI-xxx; Hōshō in 1941-42; CII-xxx; Chitose in early 1944; 331-xxx Chiyoda in early 1944; 332-xxx Zuihō in early 1944; 333-xxx late 1944; 653-xxx

The 3rd Carrier Division (第三航空戦隊,, Dai San Kōkū Sentai, "San Kōsen") was primarily a seaplane tender unit of the Imperial Japanese Navy's Combined Fleet.

== Organization ==
Date	Higher unit	Ships and air units
1 June 1936 (original)	Combined Fleet	Kamoi, Destroyer Squadron 28 : Asanagi, Yūnagi
1 December 1936	disbanded	
27 August 1937	3rd Fleet	Kamoi
20 October 1937	China Area Fleet	Kamoi, Notoro
1 December 1937	3rd Fleet	Kamoi, Kagu Maru, Kamikawa Maru
1 February 1938	5th Fleet	Kamoi, Kagu Maru, Kamikawa Maru
15 December 1938	disbanded	
15 November 1940	1st Fleet	Ryūjō, Hōshō, Destroyer squadron 34 : Akikaze, Tachikaze, Hakaze
11 August 1941	1st Fleet	Zuihō, Hōshō, Mikazuki, Yūkaze
1 April 1942	disbanded	
1 February 1944	3rd Fleet	Chitose, Chiyoda, Zuihō, 653rd Naval Air Group
15 August 1944	3rd Fleet	Zuikaku, Chitose, Chiyoda, Zuihō, 653rd Naval Air Group
15 November 1944	disbanded	

== Commander ==
	Rank	Name	Date	Note
1	R.ADM	Takamoto Togari	1 June 1936	
x		disbanded	1 December 1936	
2	Capt./R.ADM	Kōkichi Terada	27 August 1937	Rear-Admiral on 1 December 1937
x		disbanded	15 December 1938	
3	R.ADM	Kakuji Kakuta	15 November 1940	
4	R.ADM	Torao Kuwabara	1 September 1941	
x		disbanded	1 April 1942	
x		vacant post	1 February 1944	
5	R.ADM	Sueo Ōbayashi	15 February 1944	
x		vacant post	1 October 1944	
6	V.ADM	Jisaburō Ozawa	1 October 1944	
x		disbanded	15 November 1944	

== Bibliography ==
- "Monthly The Maru" series, and "The Maru Special" series, "Ushio Shobō". (Japan)
- "Monthly Ships of the World" series, "Kaijinsha". (Japan)
- "Famous Airplanes of the World" series and "Monthly Kōku Fan" series, Bunrindō (Japan)
