= Battle of Dutch Harbor =

1942 aerial bombing of a U.S. Army base on Amaknak Island, Alaska by the Japanese Navy

- Part of the American Theater of World War II
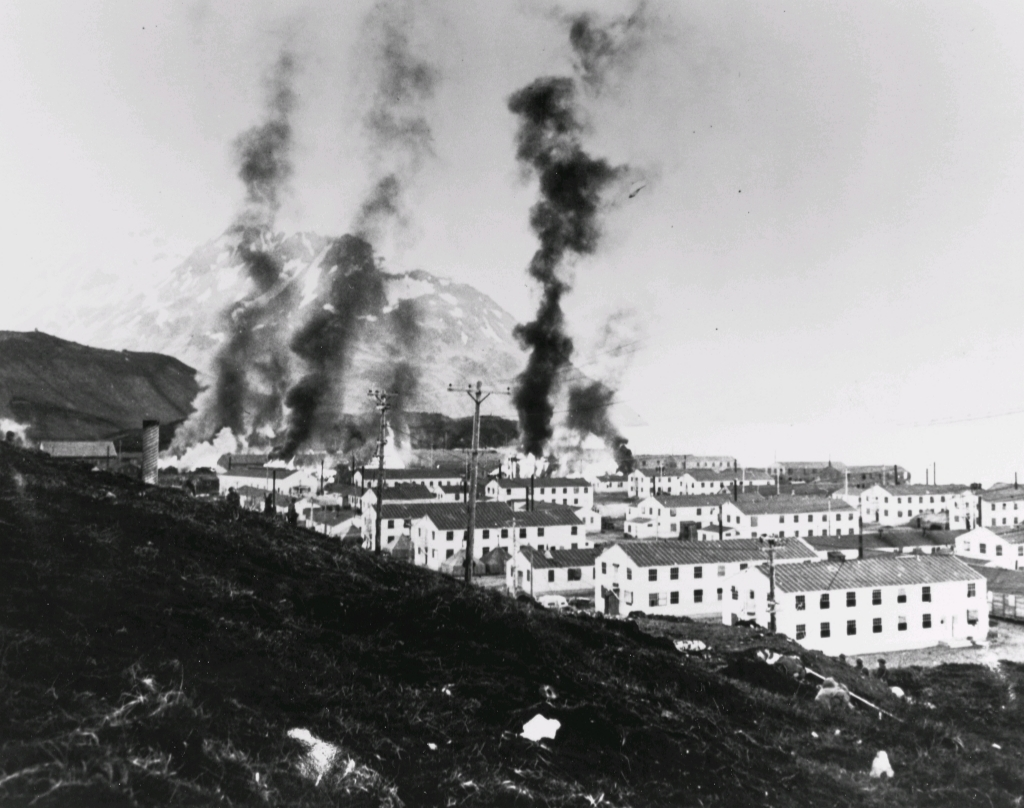
- Buildings burning after Japanese air attacks on Dutch Harbor, circa 3 June 1942.
| Date | 3–4 June 1942 |
| Location | Amaknak Island, Aleutian Islands, Alaska 53°53′15″N 166°32′32″W |
| Result | Japanese victory |

Belligerents
| United States | Japan |

Commanders and leaders
| Robert Theobald; Simon Buckner; Archibald Arnold | Kakuji Kakuta |

Strength
| 37th Infantry Regiment; 206th Coast Artillery (AA); 1 search light battery 6 anti-aircraft batteries U.S. Marines; 30 aircraft | 1 aircraft carrier 1 light carrier 3 cruisers 5 destroyers 86 aircraft |

Casualties and losses
| 43 killed 50 wounded 14 aircraft destroyed 1 barracks ship destroyed | 10 killed 5 captured 8 aircraft destroyed 1 aircraft captured |

The Battle of Dutch Harbor took place on 3-4 June 1942, when the Imperial Japanese Navy launched two aircraft carrier raids on the Dutch Harbor Naval Operating Base and U.S. Army Fort Mears at Dutch Harbor on Amaknak Island, opening the Aleutian Islands campaign of World War II. The bombing marked the first aerial attack by an enemy on North America, though Amaknak island is not part of the continental US and was not a state but the Alaska Territory at the time. This was the second time in history that North America was bombed by someone working for a foreign power, the first being the accidental bombing of Naco, Arizona, in 1929.

== Background ==
The Japanese planned to occupy islands in the Aleutians in order to extend their defensive perimeter in the North Pacific to make it more difficult for the U.S. to attack Japan from that area. The air raid on Dutch Harbor was conducted to support the invasions on Kiska Island and Attu Island by the Japanese military under Operation AL.

Dutch Harbor was ringed with anti-aircraft artillery batteries from the 206th Coast Artillery (Anti Aircraft) group of the Arkansas National Guard, and was one of the key targets protected by the Eleventh Air Force based out of mainland Alaska. The 206th CA (AA) was deployed to Dutch Harbor in the Aleutian Islands in August 1941 and had been on station for approximately four months when the Imperial Japanese Navy Air Service attacked Pearl Harbor on 7 December. The 206th CA was equipped with the 3-inch Gun M1918 (an older model with a vertical range of 26,902 ft (8,200 m)), .50 cal (12.7mm) M2 Browning machine guns, and 60 in (150 cm) Sperry searchlights. The 206th had one radar in position at Dutch Harbor at the time of the attack. In the harbor were two old destroyers, King and Talbot, destroyer-seaplane tender Gillis, submarine S-27, Coast Guard cutter Onondaga, and U.S. Army transports President Fillmore and Morlen.

== Battle ==
On 3 June 1942 a Japanese carrier strike force, under the command of Rear Admiral Kakuji Kakuta, comprising the carriers Ryūjō and Jun'yō plus escort ships, sailed to 180 mi (160 nmi; 290 km) southwest of Dutch Harbor to launch air strikes at the United States Army and United States Navy facility to support a Japanese offensive in the Aleutians and in the central Pacific at Midway.

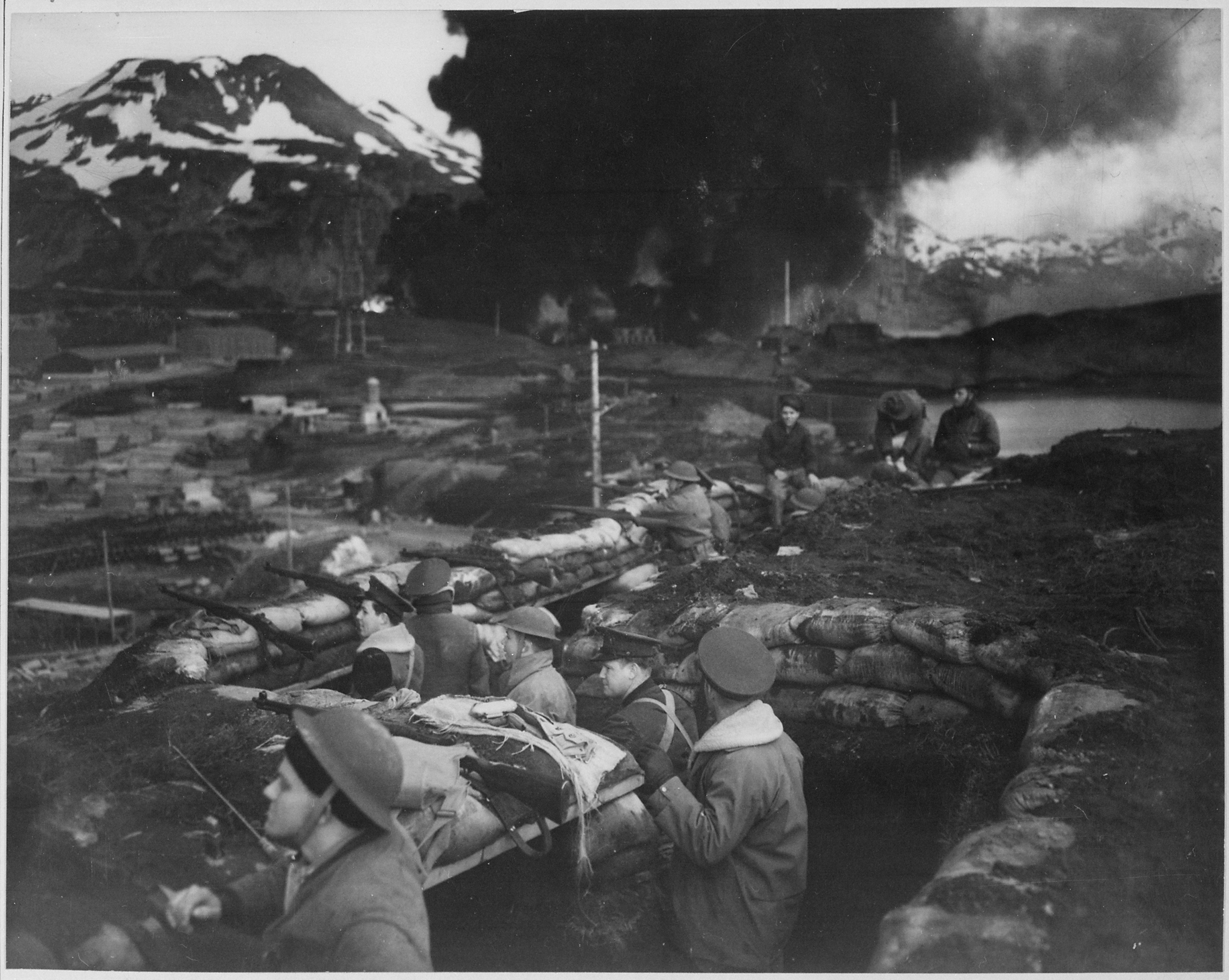
U.S. Marines observing the battle from trench positions, June 3, 1942

Shortly before dawn at 02:58, given the geographic latitude and longitude, Admiral Kakuta ordered his aircraft carriers to launch their strike which was made up of 12 A6M Zero fighters, 10 B5N Kate high-level bombers, and 12 D3A Val dive bombers which took off from the two small carriers in the freezing weather to strike at Dutch Harbor. One B5N was lost on takeoff from Ryujo.

The planes arrived over the harbor at 04:07 and attacked the town's radio station and oil storage tanks causing some damage. Many members of the 206th were awakened by the sound of bombs and gunfire. While the unit had been on alert for an attack for many days, there was no specific warning of the attack before the Japanese planes arrived over Dutch Harbor. With no clear direction from headquarters, gun crews from every battery quickly realized the danger, ran to their guns stationed around the harbor and began to return fire. In addition to their 3 in (76 mm) guns, 37 mm (1.46 in) guns and .50 in (12.7 mm) machine guns, members of the unit fired their rifles, and one even claimed to have hurled a wrench at a low-flying enemy plane. Several members reported being able to clearly see the faces of the Japanese aviators as they made repeated runs over the island. The highest casualties on the first day occurred when bombs struck barracks 864 and 866 in Fort Mears, killing 17 servicemen of the 37th Infantry and eight from the 151st Engineers.

When all the Japanese planes were recovered, there were erroneous reports of enemy ships in the vicinity, but search planes found no ships within the area. During the search, four Nakajima E8N2 "Dave" two-seat reconnaissance planes—launched from the heavy cruisers Takao and Maya—encountered U.S. fighters searching for the departing Japanese squadron.

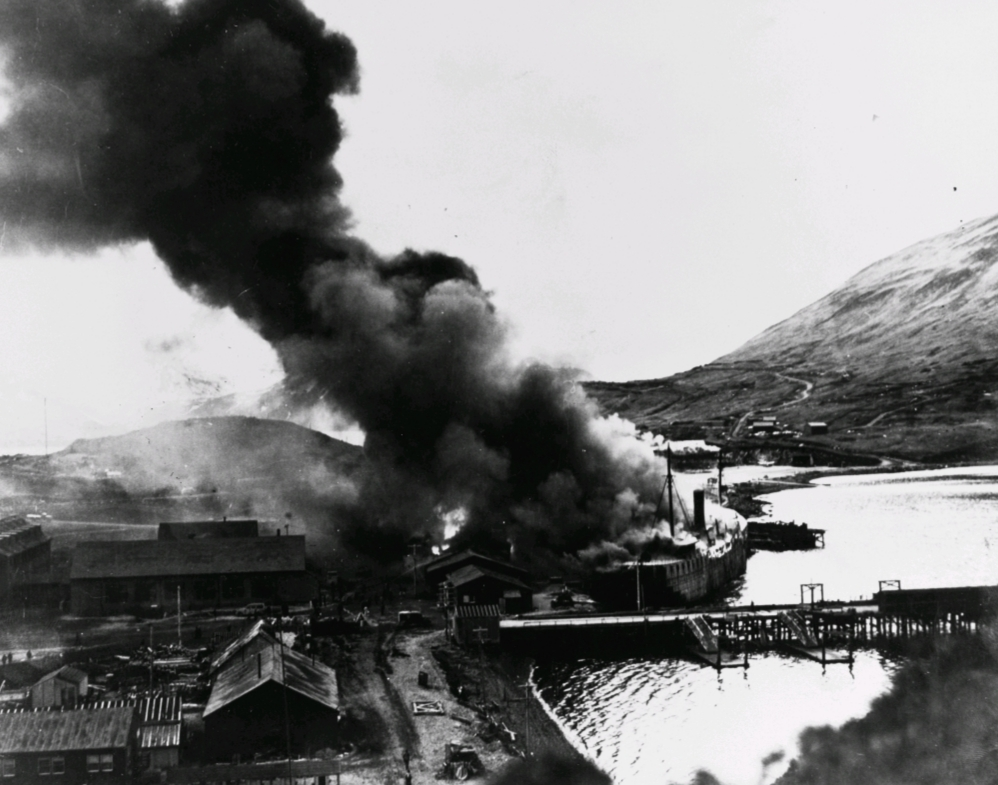
Barracks ship Northwestern engulfed by flames in Dutch Harbor after the second Japanese airstrike, June 4, 1942

The 206th CA spent much of the night of 3/4 June moving guns down off the mountain tops surrounding the harbor down into the city of Unalaska and into harbor facilities. This was partially as a deception and partially to defend against an expected land invasion. Civilian contractors filled sandbags to protect the new gun positions.

On 4 June the Japanese carriers steamed to less than 100 mi (87 nmi; 160 km) south of Dutch Harbor to launch a second attack. At 16:00, a second airstrike of nine fighters, 11 dive bombers, and six level bombers attacked less than an hour later. More targets were damaged including some grounded aircraft, an army barracks, oil storage tanks, aircraft hangar, and a few merchant ships in the port. The Zero fighters concentrated on strafing the gun positions, while the bombers destroyed the fuel tanks located at the harbor. One wing of the military hospital at the base was destroyed. After hitting the fuel tanks, the enemy dive-bombers and high-level bombers concentrated on the ships in the harbor, Fillmore and Gillis. Driven away from these two targets by intense anti-aircraft fire, they finally succeeded in destroying the station ship Northwestern which, because of its large size, they mistakenly believed was a warship. Northwestern was actually a transport ship which had been beached and used as a barracks for civilian workers. Although in flames and badly damaged, firefighters managed to save the hull. Its power plant was thereafter used to produce steam and electricity for the shore installations. An anti-aircraft gun was blown up, and four U.S. Navy servicemen were killed.

Two Japanese dive bombers and one fighter, damaged by anti-aircraft fire, failed to return to their carriers. On the way back, the Japanese planes encountered an air patrol of six Curtiss P-40 fighters over Otter Point. A short aerial battle ensued which resulted in the loss of one Japanese fighter and two more dive bombers. Two out of the six U.S. fighters were lost as well.

== Aftermath ==
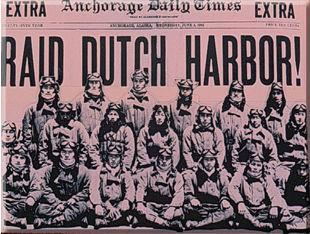
Front page of the June 3, 1942 Anchorage Daily Times featuring the attack

As a result of the enemy actions, the Eleventh Air Force lost four B-17s, two Martin B-26 Marauders, and two P-40s, while the Navy suffered six PBY Catalinas destroyed. 43 Americans were killed: 33 soldiers, eight sailors, a Marine, and a civilian. Another 50 were wounded in the attack.

None of the Japanese ships were harmed, but one Zero was damaged by ground fire and crash-landed on Akutan Island, about 20 mi (17 nmi; 32 km) northeast of Dutch Harbor. Although the pilot was killed, the plane was not seriously damaged. This Zero—known as the "Akutan Zero"—was recovered by American forces, inspected, and repaired. The recovery was an important technical intelligence gain for the U.S., as it showed the strengths and weaknesses of the Zero's design.

The following day, Admiral Kakuta received orders to break off further attacks and head for the central Pacific to support the Combined Fleet which was retreating after being defeated at Midway. Two days later, a small Japanese invasion force landed and occupied two of the Aleutian Islands, Attu and Kiska, without further incident. Aleuts on Kiska and Attu were imprisoned on the Japanese mainland.

The bombing of Dutch Harbor and the subsequent occupations of Kiska and Attu by the Japanese helped trigger an impression among Americans that they were going to launch a full-scale attack along the United States West Coast. As a result, military and commandeered civilian aircraft flew nearly 2,300 troops to Nome, along with artillery and antiaircraft guns and several tons of other equipment and supplies to deter a possible Japanese landing in mainland Alaska.

Fearing a Japanese attack on other Aleutian Islands and mainland Alaska, the U.S. government evacuated hundreds more Aleuts from the western chain and the Pribilofs, placing them in internment camps in southeast Alaska, where many died of measles, influenza and other infectious diseases which spread quickly in the overcrowded dormitories. In total, about 75 died in American internment and 19 as a result of Japanese occupation. The Aleut Restitution Act of 1988 was an attempt by the Congress to compensate the survivors. On 17 June 2017 the U.S. government formally apologized for the internment of the Unangan people and their treatment in the camps.
