= Kakuji Kakuta =

Japanese admiral (1890–1944)

- 角田 覚治
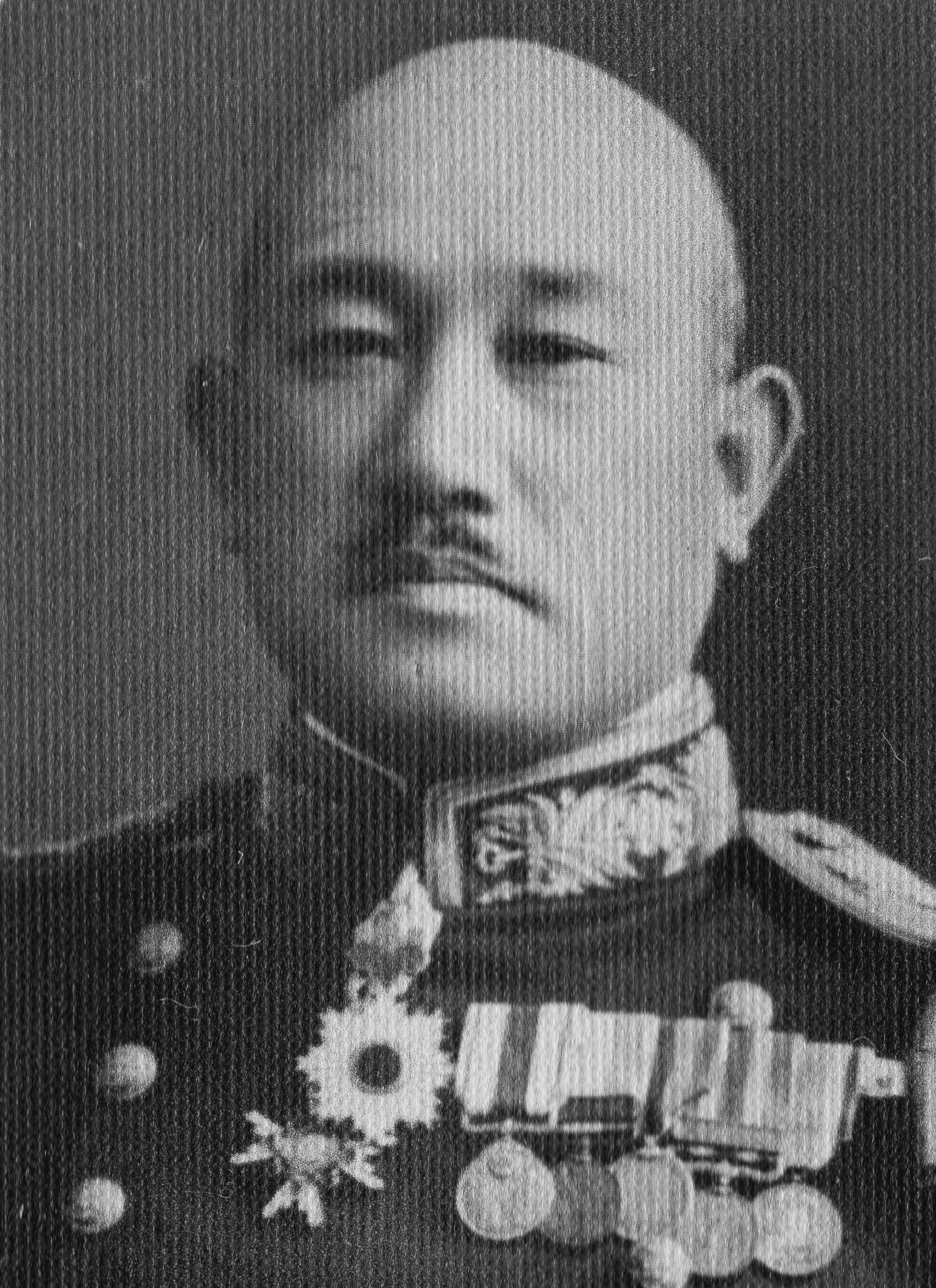
- Born: 23 September 1890; Niigata Prefecture, Japan
- Died: 2 August 1944 (aged 53); Tinian, Mariana Islands
- Military career
- Allegiance: Empire of Japan
- Branch: Imperial Japanese Navy
- Service years: 1911–1944
- Rank: Vice Admiral
- Commands: Kiso; Furutaka; Iwate; Yamashiro; Nagato; 3rd Carrier Division; 4th Carrier Division; 2nd Carrier Division; 1st Air Fleet
- Conflicts: World War II; Pacific War; Indian Ocean Raid; Battle of Dutch Harbor; Battle of the Santa Cruz Islands; Naval Battle of Guadalcanal; Battle of the Philippine Sea; Battle of Tinian (MIA)

Kakuji Kakuta (角田 覚治, Kakuta Kakuji; 23 September 1890 – 2 August 1944), was an admiral in the Imperial Japanese Navy during World War II. He is noted for his role in commanding Japanese naval aviation units in the Pacific War.

== Biography ==
Kakuta was a native of rural Minamikanbara, Niigata Prefecture, Japan. He graduated from the 39th class of the Imperial Japanese Navy Academy, scoring 45th out of a class of 145 cadets in 1911. He served as midshipman on the cruiser Aso and battlecruiser Ibuki. On commissioning as ensign, he was assigned to the cruiser Chiyoda. Later, as a lieutenant, he served on the battleship Settsu and the cruiser Azuma during World War I. He then served on the battleship Kirishima and destroyer Yanagi, and was chief gunner on the cruisers Suma and Tenryū.

Kakuta was appointed as equipment officer on the cruiser Yubari in 1923. He then attended the 23rd class of the Naval Staff College, and was promoted to lieutenant commander upon graduation. In 1926, he served as chief gunner on the cruiser Furutaka and subsequently in a number of staff positions. His first command was the cruiser Kiso, beginning on 10 March 1934. He subsequently commanded cruisers Furutaka and Iwate, and battleships Yamashiro and Nagato. He was promoted to rear admiral on 15 November 1939.

At the start of the Pacific War in December 1941, Kakuta was in command of Carrier Division 4, consisting of the aircraft carrier Ryūjō, which provided air support for landings of Japanese forces in the Philippines. Kakuta also participated in the Indian Ocean Raid against British bases in India and Ceylon in early 1942.

During the Battle of Midway in June 1942, Kakuta commanded a task force consisting of carriers Ryūjō and Jun'yō that conducted air raids against Dutch Harbor as part of the initial stages of the Aleutian Islands Campaign.

Later, as commander of the Second Carrier Striking Force that included aircraft units assigned to carriers Jun'yō and Zuikaku, Kakuta directed aircraft operations against U.S. naval forces during the Battle of the Santa Cruz Islands and the Naval Battle of Guadalcanal.

Kakuta was promoted to vice admiral on 1 November 1942. Following the death of Admiral Isoroku Yamamoto, the new Commander in Chief of the Combined Fleet, Mineichi Koga, restructured the Imperial Japanese Navy around the American carrier task force concept. On 1 July 1943, Kakuta was assigned command of the First Air Fleet which included all land-based naval aircraft units located throughout the Philippines and Japanese-held islands in the central Pacific. However, the squadrons suffered massive aircraft and personnel losses from American carrier raids in February 1944. Under Kakuta's direction from his headquarters on Tinian, many of the remaining aircraft units participated in the Battle of the Philippine Sea in June 1944, but were unable to play a decisive role, suffering further heavy losses.

Kakuta was the senior military officer on the island during the Battle of Tinian although he was not directly responsible for the defenses. As the Americans closed in on Tinian, Kakuta and his staff made repeated efforts to escape in rubber boats at prearranged rendezvous with a Japanese submarine. After several failed attempts, Kakuta and his staff withdrew to a cave on the east coast of Tinian and were never seen again. It is presumed that Kakuta committed suicide soon after the Americans landed and that his body was buried in a secret location by members of his staff.

== Notes ==
Military offices
| Preceded by none | Administrator of Occupied Aleutian Islands and Commander of North Sea Garrison; 1942—1943 | Succeeded by Yasuyo Yamasaki |
