= Tamon Yamaguchi =

Imperial Japanese Navy admiral

- 山口 多聞
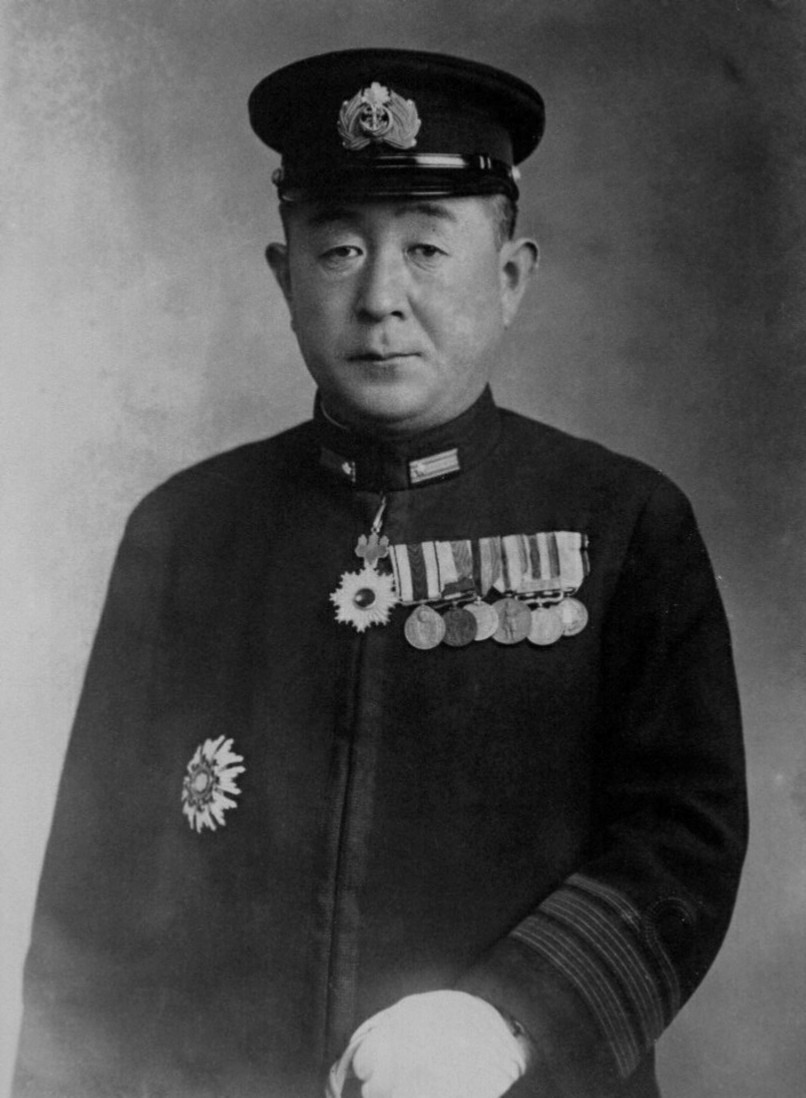
- Rear Admiral Yamaguchi (1940–42)
- Born: August 17, 1892; Tokyo, Japan
- Died: June 5, 1942 (aged 49); Pacific Ocean (near Midway Island)
- Military career
- Allegiance: Empire of Japan
- Branch: Imperial Japanese Navy
- Service years: 1912–1942
- Rank: Vice Admiral (posthumous)
- Commands: Isuzu, Ise, 1st Combined Air Group, 2nd Carrier Division
- Conflicts: World War I; Second Sino-Japanese War; World War II; Pacific War; Attack on Pearl Harbor; Battle of Wake Island; Battle of Ambon; Bombing of Darwin; Indian Ocean Raid; Battle of Midway †
- Awards: Order of the Rising Sun (4th class); Order of the Sacred Treasure (2nd class); Order of the Golden Kite (1st class)

Tamon Yamaguchi (山口 多聞, Yamaguchi Tamon; 17 August 1892 – 5 June 1942) was a rear admiral in the Imperial Japanese Navy who served during the Second Sino-Japanese War, and in the Pacific War during World War II. Yamaguchi's carrier force was part of the attack on Pearl Harbor. He subsequently participated in the Battle of Midway, where he was killed in action, choosing to go down with the aircraft carrier Hiryū when she was scuttled after being crippled by aircraft from USS Enterprise and USS Yorktown.

== Life ==
=== Early career ===
Yamaguchi was born in Koishikawa, Tokyo, and was the third son of a former samurai retainer of Matsue Domain. His given name "Tamon" was the childhood name of the medieval hero Kusunoki Masashige. He attended the Kaisei Academy and was accepted into the 40th class of the Imperial Japanese Naval Academy, which he graduated in 1912, ranked 21st out of 144 cadets. His classmates included Takijirō Ōnishi and Matome Ugaki. As an ensign, he served on the cruiser Chikuma and battleship Aki. After his commissioning as a lieutenant junior grade, he completed naval artillery and torpedo school training and was assigned to the 3rd Submarine Squadron in December 1916. He was dispatched to the Mediterranean with the Japanese fleet as part of Japan's contribution to the Anglo-Japanese Alliance in World War I and participated in combat operations as an officer on the destroyer Kashi based on Malta from July 1918. He was promoted to the rank of Lieutenant in December of that year. In January 1919, he was assigned to a navigation unit with the naval squadron escorting Imperial German Navy submarines received by the Japanese government as part of reparation payments from Germany at the end of World War I. He served in shore-based administrative assignments at Yokosuka Naval District (from July 1919), Kure Naval District (from October 1919) and Sasebo Naval District (from December 1920).

In March 1921, Yamaguchi was sent to the United States to attend Princeton University at the Navy's expense, and returned to Japan in May 1923. On his return to Japan, he was assigned to the battleship Nagato for six months, before serving as an instructor at the Submarine School from December 1923 to December 1924. He then attended the Naval Staff College, from which he graduated with honors in November 1926. From November 1927, he was assigned to the Imperial Japanese Navy General Staff. Yamaguchi was promoted to commander in December 1928.

Assigned to the Japanese delegation at the London Naval Conference 1930, he joined Admiral Isoroku Yamamoto in vocal opposition to the terms of the disarmament treaty. After his return to Japan, he was assigned as executive officer on the cruiser Yura from July 1930. From November 1930, he was assigned to the staff of the Combined Fleet. He served as an instructor at the Naval Staff College from November 1932 and was promoted to the rank of captain in December of that year.

Yamaguchi was the naval attaché to the Japanese embassy at Washington, D.C., from June 1934 to November 1936. On his return to Japan, he received his first command, the cruiser Isuzu from December 1936 to December 1937, followed by the battleship Ise to December 1938.

=== World War II ===
With the start of the Second Sino-Japanese War, the Ise was assigned to patrols off the southern Chinese coast. Yamaguchi was promoted to rear admiral on 15 November 1938. From December, he was the chief-of-staff of the IJN 5th Fleet and from November 1939 was on the staff of the IJN 1st Fleet. In January 1940, he became commander of the 1st Combined Air Group, and in this capacity directed a saturation bombing campaign in central China through 1940, including the Bombing of Chongqing.

In November 1940, Yamaguchi was reassigned to command the 2nd Carrier Division, consisting of the aircraft carriers Sōryū and Hiryū. In preparation for the attack on Pearl Harbor, Yamaguchi trained his flight crews ruthlessly, which led to many accidents and complaints; however, the training paid off after the start of combat operations. Following the successful strike against the American fleet at Pearl Harbor, Yamaguchi's carrier force participated in the Battle of Wake Island. After the start of 1942, he was sent south to assist in the Battle of Ambon in the Dutch East Indies, followed by the Bombing of Darwin in February. In March, his carriers supported Japanese forces in the Battle of Java, sweeping the Dutch East Indies of remaining Allied warships. In April, he crossed into the Indian Ocean to support the large-scale raid against the Royal Navy at and near Ceylon.

Yamaguchi returned to Japan briefly in late April for maintenance on his fleet, at a time when the IJN General Staff was making plans for a Second Operational Phase of the Pacific War. Yamaguchi proposed an ambitious plan that included the occupation of New Zealand and Australia in July, and occupation of Hawaii in January 1943. But this was not to be. In June 1942, he was assigned to the Midway operation. During the battle, on 4 June 1942, Yamaguchi disagreed with the fleet commander, Vice Admiral Chūichi Nagumo. A reconnaissance plane discovered an American aircraft carrier (USS Yorktown) near Midway. At that moment, the Japanese planes had been armed for a second strike on Midway, with the "Kate" level bombers carrying bombs rather than torpedoes. Yamaguchi called for an immediate strike on the US ship, with the planes armed as they were, but Nagumo decided instead to wait until the planes had been re-armed. Shortly afterward, American carrier aircraft destroyed all the Japanese carriers except Yamaguchi's flagship Hiryū. Yamaguchi quickly ordered two successive attacks on Yorktown which crippled it. Hiryū was then crippled by aircraft from USS Enterprise, plus some orphaned Yorktown aircraft.

=== Death ===
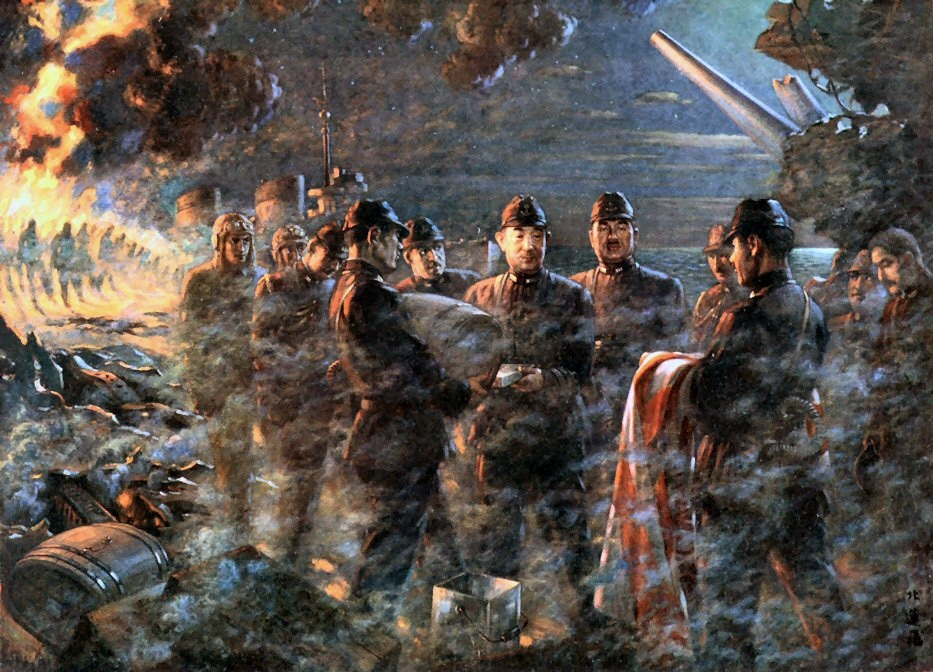
Last Moment of Admiral Yamaguchi, by Renzō Kita, 1943

During the Battle of Midway in early June 1942, Hiryū was the last remaining operational fleet carrier of the Imperial Japanese Navy after Akagi, Kaga, and Sōryū had been disabled by U.S. carrier aircraft. Hiryū launched counterattacks that damaged the American carrier USS Yorktown before being located later on 4 June and attacked by U.S. carrier-based dive bombers, leaving the ship heavily damaged and unable to conduct flight operations.

After it became clear that Hiryū could not be saved, her surviving crew were ordered to abandon ship. Rear Admiral Tamon Yamaguchi chose to remain aboard and was killed when the carrier sank. The damaged carrier was subsequently scuttled by Japanese destroyers to prevent her capture by American forces.

Hiryū sank on 5 June 1942, with Yamaguchi and others still aboard. Yamaguchi was posthumously promoted to vice admiral and awarded the Order of the Golden Kite, 1st class.

== Decorations ==
- 1939 – Order of the Sacred Treasure, 2nd class
- 1945 – Order of the Golden Kite, 1st class

== Promotions ==
- Midshipman – 17 July 1912
- Ensign – 1 December 1913
- Sublieutenant – 13 December 1915
- Lieutenant – 1 December 1918
- Lieutenant Commander – 1 December 1924
- Commander – 10 December 1928
- Captain – 1 December 1932
- Rear Admiral – 15 November 1938
- Vice Admiral – 5 June 1942 (Posthumous)

== In film and fiction ==
In the 1960 film Hawaii Midway Ocean Combat; The Storm in The Pacific (ハワイ・ミッドウェイ大海空戦 太平洋の嵐), Yamaguchi was portrayed by Toshiro Mifune.

In the 1970 film Tora! Tora! Tora!, Yamaguchi was portrayed by Susumu Fujita.

In the 1976 film Midway, Yamaguchi was portrayed by Hawaiian actor John Fujioka.

He appears in the 2009 manga series by Kouta Hirano, Drifters. In the 2016 anime adaptation, he is voiced by Yutaka Nakano.

In Toei's 2011 war film Isoroku, Yamaguchi was portrayed by Hiroshi Abe.

In the 2019 film Midway, Yamaguchi is portrayed by Tadanobu Asano.

== Footnotes ==
Military offices
Preceded by Matsunaga Sadaichi	Isuzu; Commanding Officer; December 1, 1936 – December 1, 1937	Succeeded by Nakamura Motoji
Preceded by Takasu Sanjirō	Ise; Commanding Officer; December 1, 1937 – November 15, 1938	Succeeded by Yamaguchi Gisaburō
Preceded by Tayui Minoru	5th Fleet; Chief-of-staff; December 15, 1938 – November 15, 1939	Succeeded by Nakazawa Tasuku
Preceded by Kuwahara Torao	First Combined Air Group; Commander; January 15, 1940 – November 1, 1940	Succeeded by Ōnishi Takijirō
Preceded by Totsuka Michitarō	Second Carrier Division; Commander; November 1, 1940 – June 5, 1942	Succeeded by Kakuta Kakuji
