= Japanese aircraft carrier Ryūjō =

Light aircraft carrier of the Imperial Japanese Navy

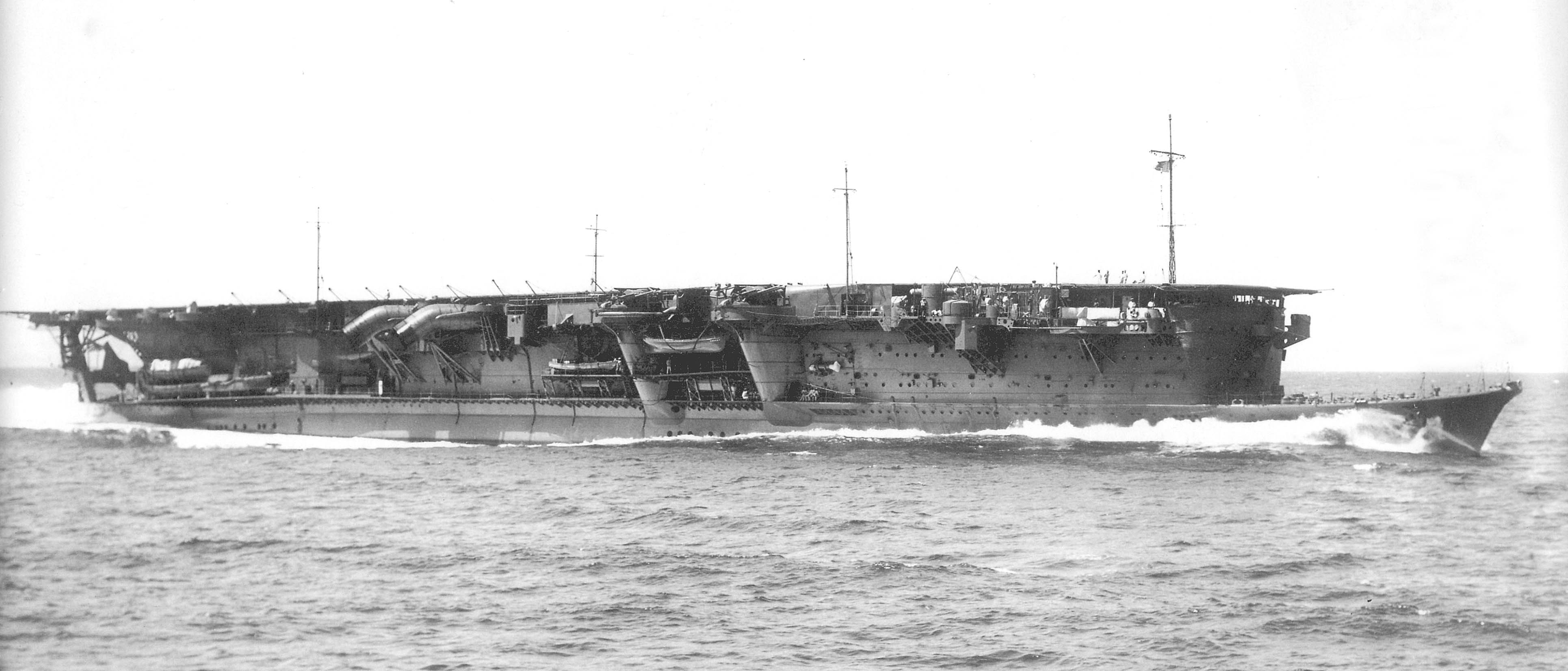
- Oblique view of Ryūjō at speed, 6 September 1934

Class overview
- Operators: Imperial Japanese Navy
- Preceded by: Kaga
- Succeeded by: Sōryū
- Built: 1929–1931
- In commission: 1931–1942
- Completed: 1
- Lost: 1

History

Empire of Japan
- Name: Ryūjō
- Builder: Mitsubishi, Yokohama
- Laid down: 26 November 1929
- Launched: 2 April 1931
- Commissioned: 9 May 1933
- Stricken: 10 November 1942
- Fate: Sunk during the Battle of the Eastern Solomons, 24 August 1942

General characteristics (as built)
- Type: Light aircraft carrier
- Displacement: 8,000 t (7,900 long tons) (standard); 10,150 t (9,990 long tons) (normal)
- Length: 179.9 meters (590 ft 3 in) (o/a)
- Beam: 20.32 meters (66 ft 8 in)
- Draught: 5.56 meters (18 ft 3 in)
- Installed power: 12 × Kampon water-tube boilers; 65,000 shp (48,000 kW)
- Propulsion: 2 × shafts; 2 × geared steam turbines
- Speed: 29 knots (54 km/h; 33 mph)
- Range: 10,000 nmi (19,000 km; 12,000 mi) at 14 knots (26 km/h; 16 mph)
- Complement: 600
- Armament: 6 × twin 12.7 cm (5 in) DP guns; 12 × twin 13.2 mm (0.5 in) AA MGs
- Aircraft carried: 48

General characteristics (1936)
- Displacement: 10,600 t (10,400 long tons) (standard); 12,732 t (12,531 long tons) (normal)
- Beam: 20.78 meters (68 ft 2 in)
- Draught: 7.08 meters (23 ft 3 in)
- Complement: 934
- Armament: 4 × twin 12.7 cm dual-purpose guns; 2 × twin 25 mm (1 in) AA guns

Ryūjō (Japanese: 龍驤 "Prancing Dragon") was a light aircraft carrier built for the Imperial Japanese Navy (IJN) during the early 1930s. Small and lightly built to exploit a loophole in the Washington Naval Treaty of 1922, she proved to be top-heavy and only marginally stable and was back in the shipyard for modifications within a year of completion. With her stability improved, Ryūjō returned to service and was employed in operations during the Second Sino-Japanese War.

During World War II, she provided air support for operations in the Philippines, Malaya, and the Dutch East Indies, where her aircraft participated in the Second Battle of the Java Sea. During the Indian Ocean raid in April 1942, the carrier attacked British merchant shipping. Ryūjō was next in the Battle of Dutch Harbor, the opening battle of the Aleutian Islands campaign, in June 1942. She was sunk by American carrier-based aircraft in the Battle of the Eastern Solomons on 24 August 1942.

== Design ==
Ryūjō was planned as a light carrier of around 8,000 metric tons (7,900 long tons) standard displacement to exploit a loophole in the Washington Naval Treaty of 1922 that carriers under 10,000 long tons (10,000 t) standard displacement were not regarded as "aircraft carriers". While Ryūjō was under construction, Article Three of the London Naval Treaty of 1930 closed the above-mentioned loophole; consequently, Ryūjō was the only light aircraft carrier of her type to be completed by Japan.

Ryūjō had a length of 179.9 meters (590 ft 3 in) overall. with a beam of 20.32 meters (66 ft 8 in) and a draft of 5.56 meters (18 ft 3 in). She displaced 8,000 metric tons (7,900 long tons) at standard load and 10,150 metric tons (9,990 long tons) at normal load. Her crew consisted of 600 officers and enlisted men.

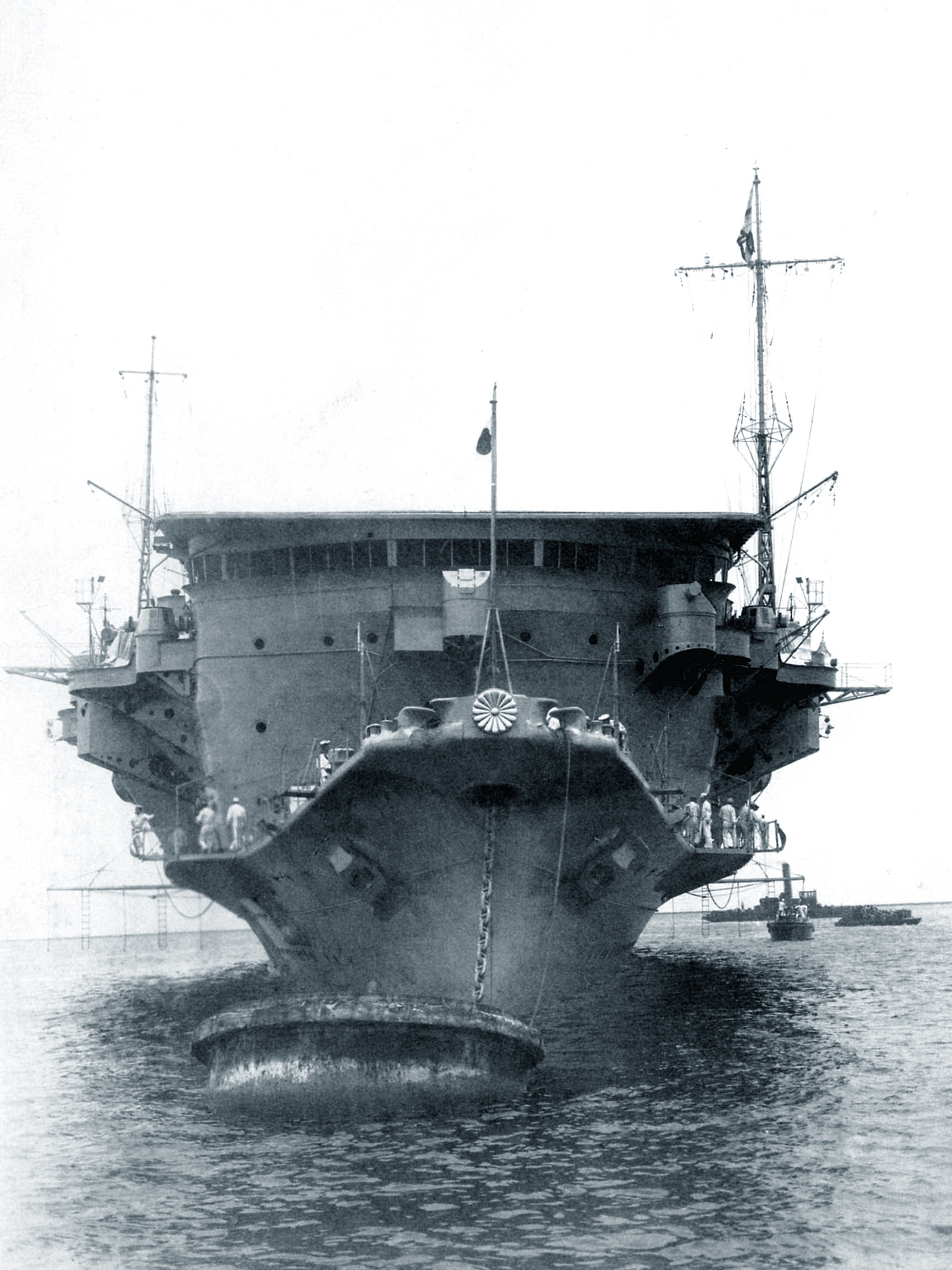
Bow view of Ryūjō, 19 June 1933

To keep Ryūjō's weight to 8,000 metric tons, the hull was lightly built with no armor; some protective plating was added abreast the machinery spaces and magazines. She was also designed with only a single hangar, which would have left an extremely low profile (there being just 4.6 meters (15 ft 1 in) of freeboard amidships and 3.0 meters (9 ft 10 in) aft). Between the time the carrier was laid down in 1929 and launched in 1931, the Navy doubled her aircraft stowage requirement to 48 in order to give her a more capable air group. This necessitated the addition of a second hangar atop the first, raising freeboard to 14.9 meters (48 ft 11 in). Coupled with the ship's narrow beam, the consequent top-heaviness made her minimally stable in rough seas, despite the fitting of Sperry active stabilizers. This was a common flaw amongst many treaty-circumventing Japanese warships of her generation.

The Tomozuru Incident of 12 March 1934, in which a top-heavy torpedo boat capsized in heavy weather, caused the IJN to investigate the stability of all their ships, resulting in design changes to improve stability and increase hull strength. Ryūjō, already known to be only marginally stable, was promptly docked at the Kure Naval Arsenal for modifications that strengthened her keel and added ballast and shallow torpedo bulges to improve her stability. Her funnels were moved higher up the side of her hull and curved downward to keep the deck clear of smoke.

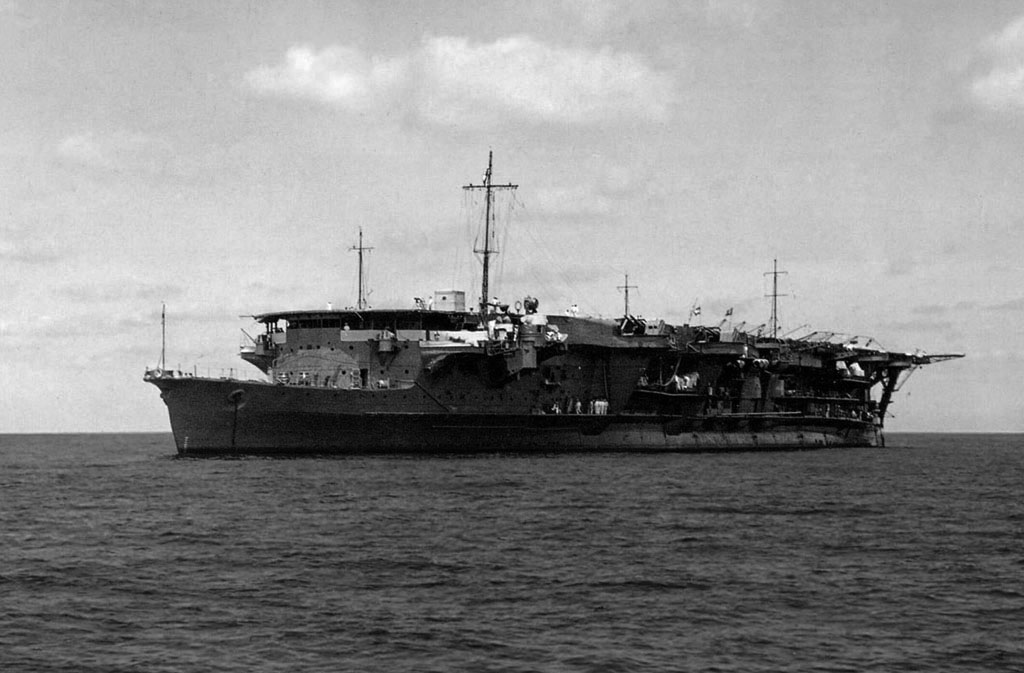
Ryūjō at anchor in 1936 after reconstruction

Shortly afterward, Ryūjō was one of many Japanese warships caught in a typhoon on 25 September 1935 while on maneuvers during the "Fourth Fleet Incident." The ship's bridge, flight deck and superstructure were damaged and the hangar was flooded. The forecastle was raised one deck and the bow was remodelled with more flare to improve the sea handling. After these modifications, the beam and draft increased to 20.78 meters (68 ft 2 in) and 7.08 meters (23 ft 3 in) respectively. The displacement also increased to 10,600 metric tons (10,400 long tons) at standard load and 12,732 metric tons (12,531 long tons) at normal load. The crew also grew to 924 officers and enlisted men.

=== Machinery ===
The ship was fitted with two geared steam turbine sets with a total of 65,000 shaft horsepower (48,000 kW), each driving one propeller shaft, using steam provided by six Kampon water-tube boilers. Ryūjō had a designed speed of 29 knots (54 km/h; 33 mph), but reached 29.5 knots (54.6 km/h; 33.9 mph) during her sea trials from 65,270 shp (48,670 kW). The ship carried 2,490 long tons (2,530 t) of fuel oil, which gave her a range of 10,000 nautical miles (19,000 km; 12,000 mi) at 14 knots (26 km/h; 16 mph). The boiler uptakes were trunked to the ship's starboard side amidships and exhausted horizontally below flight deck level through two small funnels.

=== Flight deck and hangars ===
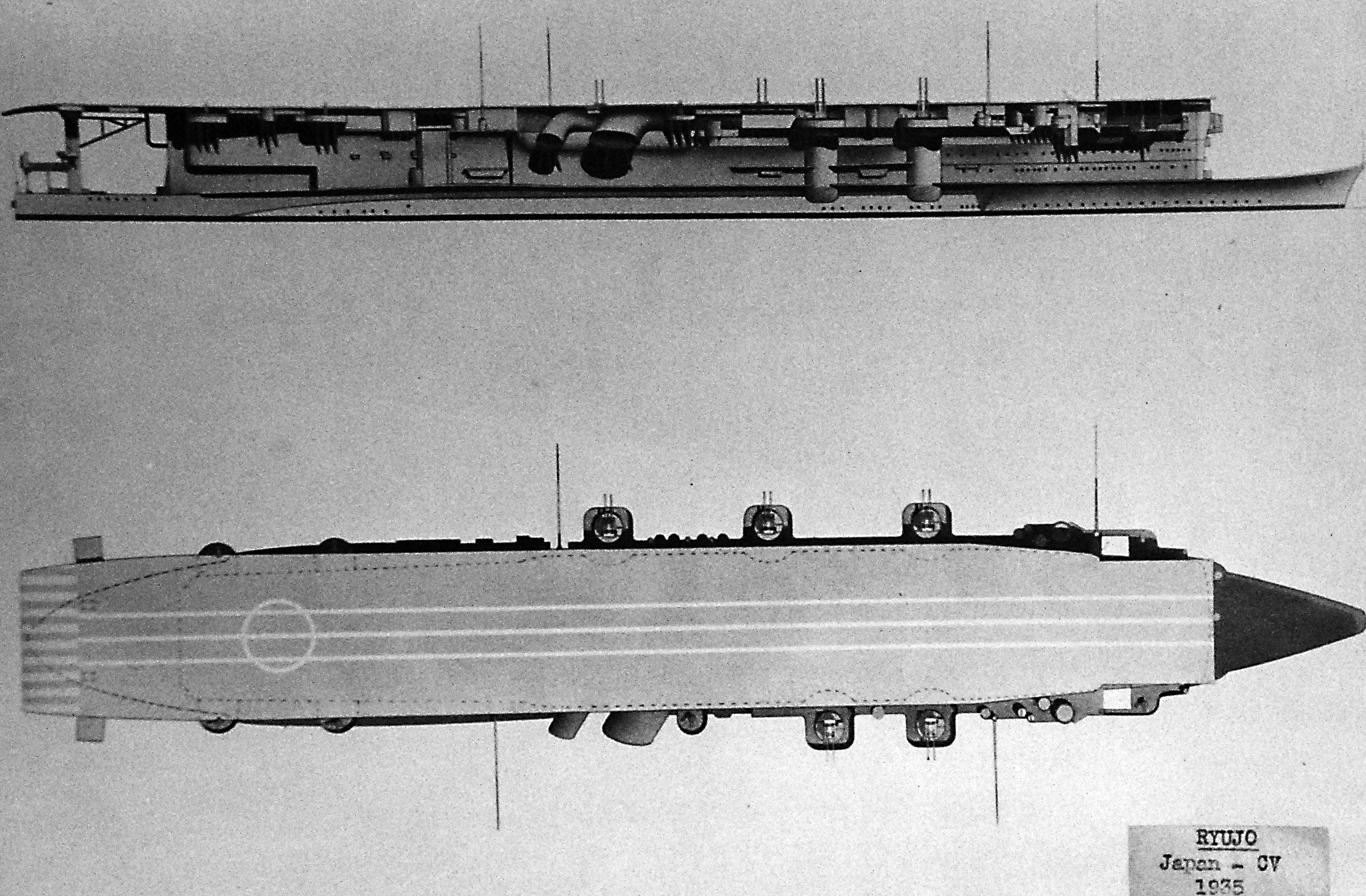
Starboard and overhead diagrams of Ryūjō

Ryūjō was a flush-decked carrier without an island superstructure; the navigating and control bridge was located just under the forward lip of the flight deck in a long glassed-in "greenhouse", whilst the superstructure was set back 23.5 meters (77 ft 1 in) from the ship's stem, giving Ryūjō a distinctive open bow. The 156.5-meter (513 ft 5 in) flight deck was 23 meters (75 ft 6 in) wide and extended well beyond the aft end of the superstructure, supported by a pair of pillars. Six transverse arrestor wires were installed on the flight deck and were modernised in 1936 to stop a 6,000 kg (13,000 lb) aircraft. The ship's hangars were both 102.4 meters (335 ft 11 in) long and 18.9 meters (62 ft 0 in) wide, and had an approximate area of 3,871 square metres (41,667 sq ft). Between them, they gave the ship the capacity to store 48 aircraft, but only 37 could be operated at one time. After the Fourth Fleet incident, Ryūjō's bridge and the leading edge of the flight deck were rounded off to make them more streamlined. This reduced the length of the flight deck by 2 meters (6 ft 7 in).

Aircraft were transported between the hangars and the flight deck by two elevators; the forward platform measured 15.7 by 11.1 meters (51.5 ft × 36.4 ft) and the rear 10.8 by 8.0 meters (35.4 ft × 26.2 ft). The small rear elevator became a problem as the IJN progressively fielded larger and more modern carrier aircraft. Of all the aircraft in front-line service in 1941, only the Nakajima B5N "Kate" torpedo bomber would fit, when positioned at an angle with its wings folded. This effectively made Ryūjō a single-elevator carrier and considerably hindered transfer of aircraft in and out of the hangars for rearming and refueling during combat operations.

=== Armament ===
As completed, Ryūjō's primary anti-aircraft (AA) armament comprised six twin-gun mounts equipped with 40-caliber 12.7-centimeter Type 89 dual-purpose guns mounted on projecting sponsons, three on either side of the carrier's hull. When firing at surface targets, the guns had a range of 14,700 meters (16,100 yd); they had a maximum ceiling of 9,440 meters (30,970 ft) at their maximum elevation of +90 degrees. Their maximum rate of fire was 14 rounds a minute, but their sustained rate of fire was around eight rounds per minute. Twenty-four anti-aircraft (AA) Type 93 13.2 mm Hotchkiss machine guns were also fitted, in twin and quadruple mounts. Their effective range against aircraft was 700–1,500 meters (770–1,640 yd). The cyclic rate was adjustable between 425 and 475 rounds per minute, but the need to change 30-round magazines reduced the effective rate to 250 rounds per minute.

During the carrier's 1934–1936 refit, two of the 12.7-centimeter (5.0 in) mountings were exchanged for two twin-gun mounts for Hotchkiss 25 mm Type 96 light AA guns, license-built, resulting in a reduction of approximately 60 long tons (61 t) of top-weight that improved the ship's overall stability. This was the standard Japanese light AA gun during World War II, but it suffered from severe design shortcomings that rendered it a largely ineffective weapon. According to historian Mark Stille, the weapon had many faults including an inability to "handle high-speed targets because it could not be trained or elevated fast enough by either hand or power, its sights were inadequate for high-speed targets, [and] it possessed excessive vibration and muzzle blast." These 25-millimeter (0.98 in) guns had an effective range of 1,500–3,000 meters (1,600–3,300 yd), and an effective ceiling of 5,500 meters (18,000 ft) at an elevation of +85 degrees. The maximum effective rate of fire was only between 110 and 120 rounds per minute because of the need to frequently change the fifteen-round magazines. The machine guns were replaced during a brief refit in April–May 1942 with six triple-mount 25-millimeter (0.98 in) AA guns.

== Construction and service ==
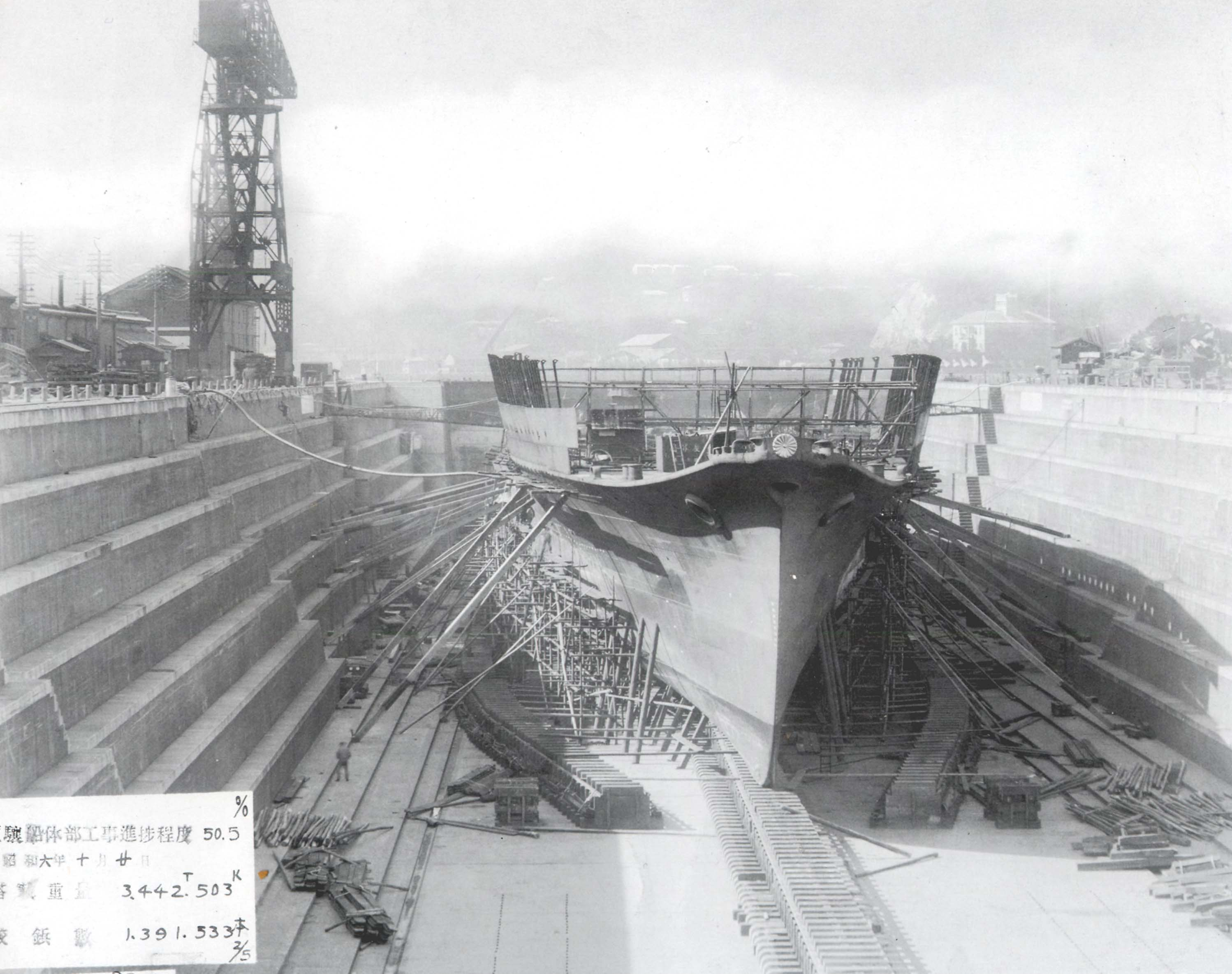
Ryūjō under construction at Yokosuka, 20 October 1931

Following the Japanese ship-naming conventions for aircraft carriers, Ryūjō was named "Prancing Dragon". The ship was laid down at the Mitsubishi's Yokohama shipyard on 26 November 1929. She was launched on 2 April 1931, towed to Yokosuka Naval Arsenal on 25 April for fitting out, and commissioned on 9 May 1933 with Captain Toshio Matsunaga in command. While training in mid-1933, her initial air group consisted of nine Mitsubishi B1M2 (Type 13) torpedo bombers, plus three spares, and three A1N1 (Type 3) fighters, plus two spares. Matsunaga was relieved by Captain Torao Kuwabara on 20 October. After the Tomozuru Incident, the ship was reconstructed from 26 May to 20 August 1934.

Captain Ichiro Ono assumed command on 15 November 1934 and Ryūjō became the flagship of Rear Admiral Hideho Wada's First Carrier Division. The following month the ship was chosen to evaluate dive-bombing tactics using six Nakajima E4N2-C Type 90 reconnaissance aircraft, six Yokosuka B3Y1 Type 92 torpedo bombers, and a dozen A2N1 Type 90 fighters. The reconnaissance aircraft proved to be unsuitable after several months' testing. Ryūjō participated in the Combined Fleet Maneuvers of 1935 where she was attached to the IJN Fourth Fleet. The fleet was caught in a typhoon on 25 September and the ship was moderately damaged. Ryūjō arrived at Kure on 11 October 1935 for repairs, modifications, and a refit that lasted until 31 May 1936. On 31 October Ono was relieved by Captain Shun'ichi Kira.

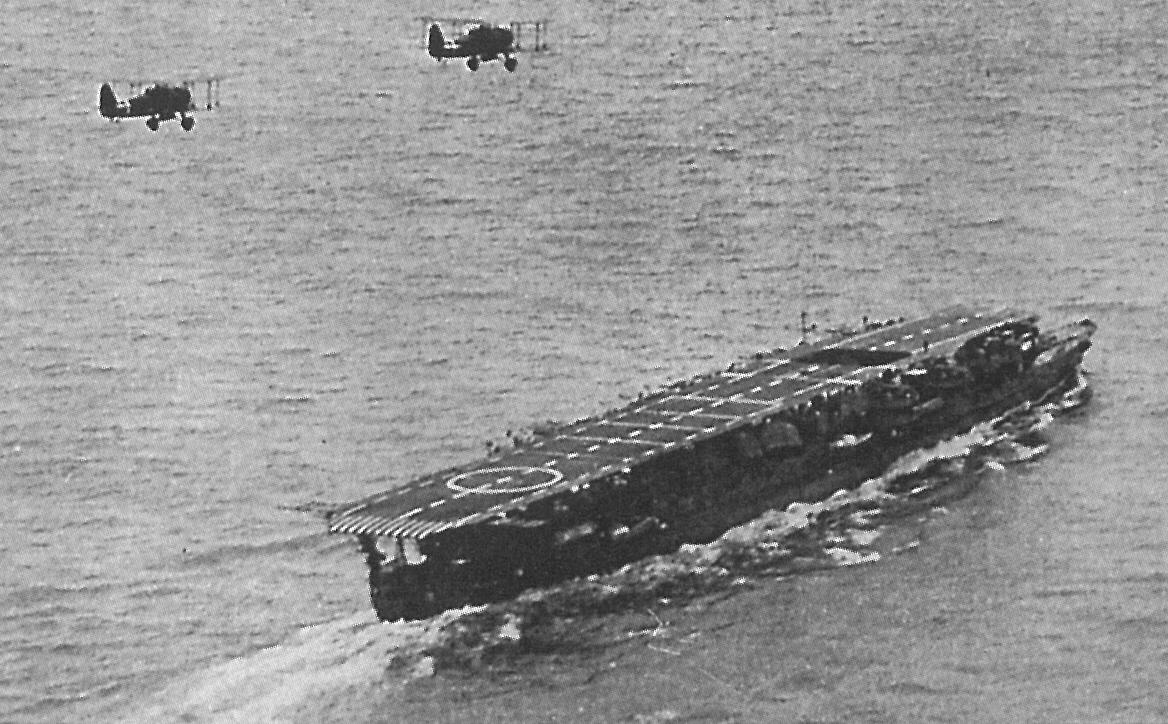
Ryūjō during the 1930s with a pair of Aichi D1A2 dive bombers overhead

In mid-1936, the ship was used to evaluate a dozen Aichi D1A dive bombers and dive-bombing tactics. She also embarked at that time 24 A4N1 fighters, plus four and eight spare aircraft respectively. In September, Ryūjō resumed her role as flagship of First Carrier Division, now commanded by Rear Admiral Saburō Satō. Her air group now consisted of a mixture of B3Y1 torpedo bombers, D1A1 dive bombers and A2N fighters, but her torpedo bombers were transferred after fleet maneuvers in October demonstrated effective dive bombing tactics. Captain Katsuo Abe assumed command of the ship on 16 November.

The First Carrier Division arrived off Shanghai on 13 August 1937 to support operations of the Japanese Army in China. Her aircraft complement consisted of 12 A4N fighters (plus four spares) and 15 D1A dive bombers. The dive bombers attacked targets in and near Shanghai. The Japanese fighters had their first aerial engagement on 22 August when four A4Ns surprised 18 Curtiss Hawk III fighters from the Nationalist Chinese Air Force and claimed to have shot down six without loss. The following day, four A4Ns claimed to have shot down nine Chinese fighters without loss to themselves. The carriers returned to Sasebo at the beginning of September to resupply before arriving off the South China coast on 21 September to attack Chinese forces near Canton. Nine fighters from Ryūjō escorted a raid on the city and claimed six of the defending fighters. While escorting another raid later that day, the Japanese pilots claimed five aircraft shot down and one probably shot down. The dive bombers attacked targets near Canton until the ship sailed to the Shanghai area on 3 October. Her air group was flown ashore on 6 October to support Japanese forces near Shanghai and Nanking. Ryūjō returned home in November and briefly became a training ship before she was assigned to Rear Admiral Tomoshige Samejima's Second Carrier Division.

In February 1938 the ship replaced her A4N biplanes with nine Mitsubishi A5M "Claude" monoplane fighters. The division supported Japanese operations in Southern China in March–April and again in October. Captain Kiichi Hasegawa assumed command on 15 November 1939. Ryūjō was given a refit that lasted from December 1939 through January 1940 and became a training ship until November when she became the flagship of Rear Admiral Kakuji Kakuta's Third Carrier Division. Hasegawa was relieved by Captain Ushie Sugimoto on 21 June. The ship's air group then consisted of 18 Nakajima B5N torpedo bombers and 16 A5M4 fighters. When the First Air Fleet was formed on 10 April 1941, Ryūjō became flagship of the Fourth Carrier Division.

=== World War II ===
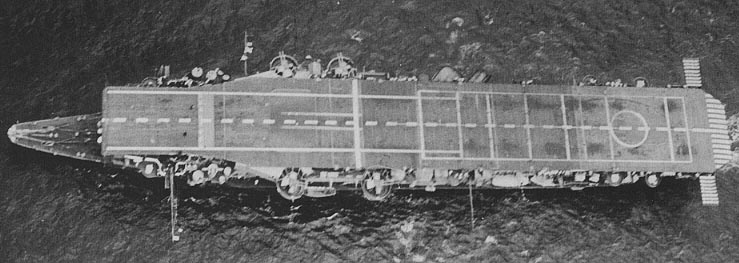
Overhead view of Ryūjō at sea around 1935

The ship's assignment at the beginning of the Pacific War was to support the invasion of the Philippines, initially by attacking the American naval base at Davao, Mindanao, on the morning of 8 December. (Note: Japan Standard Time is 19 hours ahead of Hawaiian Standard Time, so in Japan, the attack on Pearl Harbor happened on 8 December.) Her air group had not changed, but four of each type of aircraft were spares. Ryūjō's initial airstrike consisted of 13 B5Ns escorted by nine A5Ms with a smaller airstrike later in the day by two B5Ns and three A5Ms. They accomplished little, destroying two Consolidated PBY seaplanes on the ground for the loss of one B5N and one A5M. The ship covered the landing at Davao on 20 December and her B5Ns attacked a British oil tanker south of Davao. In January 1942 her aircraft supported Japanese operations in the Malay Peninsula.

In mid-February 1942, Ryūjō's aircraft attacked ships evacuating from Singapore, claiming eight ships damaged, three burnt, and four sunk. They also covered convoys carrying troops to Sumatra. The ship was unsuccessfully attacked by several Bristol Blenheim light bombers of No. 84 Squadron RAF on 14 February. The following day two waves of B5Ns, totaling 13 aircraft, attacked the British heavy cruiser Exeter, but managed only to damage the ship's Supermarine Walrus seaplane. Follow-on attacks the same day were also unsuccessful. Two days later, B5Ns destroyed HNLMS Van Ghent, a Dutch destroyer that had run aground in the Gaspar Strait and been abandoned on 14 February. The carrier sailed to Saigon, French Indochina, the next day and arrived on 20 February. A week later she was assigned to cover the convoy taking troops to Jakarta, Java. Her aircraft participated in the Second Battle of the Java Sea on 1 March and six B5Ns sank the American destroyer Pope after it had been abandoned by its crew. Six other B5Ns bombed the port of Semarang, possibly setting one merchantman on fire.

Ryūjō arrived in Singapore on 5 March and the ship supported operations in Sumatra and escorted convoys to Burma and the Andaman Islands for the rest of the month. On 1 April, while the 1st Air Fleet was starting its raid in the Indian Ocean, Malay Force, consisting of Ryūjō, six cruisers, and four destroyers, left Burma on a mission to destroy merchant shipping in the Bay of Bengal. B5Ns damaged one freighter on 5 April before the force split into three groups. Ryūjō's aircraft bombed the small ports of Cocanada and Vizagapatam on the southeastern coast of India the next day, doing little damage, in addition to claiming two ships sunk and six more damaged during the day. The carrier and her escorts, the light cruiser Yura and the destroyer Yūgiri, claimed to have sunk three more ships by gunfire. All together, Malay Force sank 19 ships totaling almost 100,000 gross register tons (GRT), before reuniting on 7 April and arriving at Singapore on 11 April. A week later, her B5Ns were detached for torpedo training and the ship arrived at Kure on 23 April for a brief refit.

The newly commissioned carrier Jun'yō joined Carrier Division 4, under the command of Kakuta, with Ryūjō on 3 May 1942. They formed the core of the 2nd Carrier Strike Force, part of the Northern Force, tasked to attack the Aleutian Islands, an operation planned to seize several of the islands to provide advance warning in case of an American attack from the Aleutians down the Kurile Islands while the main body of the American fleet was occupied defending Midway. Ryūjō's air group now consisted of 12 A6M2 Zeros and 18 B5Ns, plus two spares of each type. The ship transferred to Mutsu Bay on 25 May and then to Paramushiro on 1 June before departing the same day for the Aleutians.

At dawn on 3 June, she launched 9 B5Ns, escorted by 6 Zeros, to attack Dutch Harbor on Unalaska Island. One B5N crashed on takeoff but 6 of the B5Ns and all of the Zeros were able to make it through the bad weather, destroying two PBYs and inflicting significant damage on the oil storage tanks and barracks. A second airstrike was launched later in the day to attack a group of destroyers discovered by aircraft from the first attack, but they failed to find the targets. One Zero from Ryūjō from the second strike was damaged by a Curtiss P-40 and crash landed on the island of Akutan. The aircraft, later dubbed the Akutan Zero, remained largely intact and was later salvaged by the U.S. Navy and test flown. On the following day, the two carriers launched another airstrike, consisting of 15 Zeros, 11 D3As, and 6 B5Ns, which successfully bombed Dutch Harbor. Shortly after the aircraft were launched, the Americans attacked the carriers, but failed to inflict any damage. A Martin B-26 Marauder bomber and a PBY were shot down by Zeros, and a Boeing B-17 Flying Fortress bomber was shot down by flak during the attack.

Ryūjō arrived back at Mutsu Bay on 24 June, and departed for the Aleutians four days later to cover the second reinforcement convoy to Attu and Kiska Islands and remained in the area until 7 July in case of an American counterattack. She arrived at Kure on 13 July for a refit and was transferred to Carrier Division 2 a day later.

==== Battle of the Eastern Solomons ====
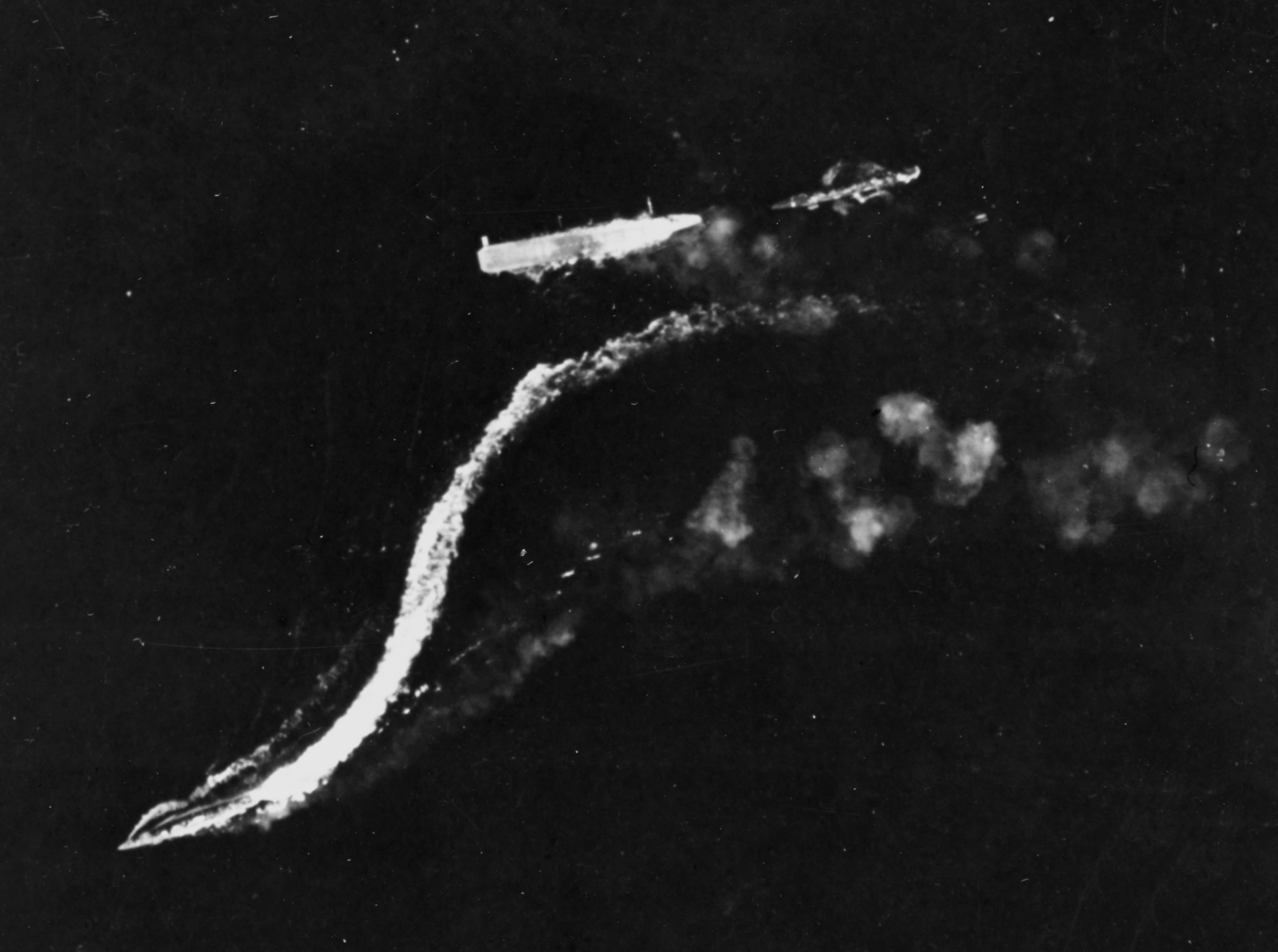
The disabled Ryūjō (top center) under attack from high altitude by B-17 bombers on 24 August 1942. The destroyer Amatsukaze (lower left) is moving away from Ryūjō at full speed and the destroyer Tokitsukaze (faintly visible, upper right) is backing away from the bow of Ryūjō in order to evade the B-17s' falling bombs.

The American landings on Guadalcanal and Tulagi on 7 August caught the Japanese by surprise. The next day, Ryūjō was transferred to Carrier Division 1 and departed for Truk on 16 August together with the other two carriers of the division, Shōkaku and Zuikaku. Her air group consisted of 24 Zeros and nine B5N2s. Admiral Isoroku Yamamoto, commander-in-chief of the Combined Fleet, ordered Truk to be bypassed and the fleet refueled at sea after an American carrier was spotted near the Solomon Islands on 21 August. At 01:45 on 24 August, Vice Admiral Chūichi Nagumo, commander of the Mobile Force, ordered Ryūjō and the heavy cruiser Tone, escorted by two destroyers, detached to move in advance of the troop convoy bound for Guadalcanal and to attack the Allied air base at Henderson Field if no carriers were spotted. This Detached Force was commanded by Rear Admiral Chūichi Hara in Tone.

Ryūjō launched two small airstrikes, totaling 6 B5Ns and 15 Zeros, beginning at 12:20 once the Diversionary Force was 200 nautical miles (370 km; 230 mi) north of Lunga Point. Four Grumman F4F Wildcat fighters from Marine Fighter Squadron VMF-223 on combat air patrol (CAP) near Henderson Field spotted the incoming Japanese aircraft around 14:20 and alerted the defenders. Ten more Wildcats from VMF-223 and VMF-212 scrambled, as well as 2 United States Army Air Corps (USAAC) Bell P-400s from the 67th Fighter Squadron in response. Nine of the Zeros strafed the airfield while the B5Ns bombed it with 60-kilogram (132 lb) bombs to little effect. The Americans claimed to have shot down 19 aircraft, but only three Zeros and three B5Ns were lost, with another B5N forced to crash-land. Only three Wildcats were shot down in turn.

Around 14:40, the Detached Force was spotted again by several search aircraft from the carrier USS Enterprise; the Japanese ships did not immediately spot the Americans. They launched three Zeros for a combat air patrol at 14:55, three minutes before two of the searching Grumman TBF Avenger torpedo bombers narrowly missed Ryūjō 150 meters (164 yd) astern with four 500-pound (227 kg) bombs. Two more Zeros reinforced the patrol shortly after 15:00, just in time to intercept two more searching Avengers, shooting down one. In the meantime, the carrier USS Saratoga had launched an airstrike against the Detached Force in the early afternoon that consisted of 31 Douglas SBD Dauntlesses and eight Avengers; the long range precluded fighter escort. They found the carrier shortly afterward and attacked. They hit Ryūjō three times with 1,000-pound (454 kg) bombs and one torpedo; the torpedo hit flooded the starboard engine and boiler rooms. No aircraft from either Ryūjō or Saratoga were shot down in the attack.

The bomb hits set the carrier on fire and she took on a list from the flooding caused by the torpedo hit. Ryūjō turned north at 14:08, but her list continued to increase even after the fires were put out. The progressive flooding disabled her machinery and caused her to stop at 14:20. The order to abandon ship was given at 15:15 and the destroyer Amatsukaze moved alongside to rescue the crew. The ships were bombed several times by multiple B-17s without effect before Ryūjō capsized about 17:55 at coordinates 06°10′S 160°50′E with the loss of seven officers and 113 crewmen. Fourteen aircraft that she had dispatched on raids returned shortly after Ryūjō sank and circled over the force until they were forced to ditch. Seven pilots were rescued.

== Bibliography ==
- Brown, David (1977). Aircraft Carriers. World War 2 Fact Files. New York: Arco Publishing. ISBN 0-668-04164-1.
- Brown, J. D. (2009). Carrier Operations in World War II. Annapolis, Maryland: Naval Institute Press. ISBN 978-1-59114-108-2.
- Campbell, John (1985). Naval Weapons of World War Two. Annapolis, Maryland: Naval Institute Press. ISBN 0-87021-459-4.
- Dull, Paul S. (1978). A Battle History of the Imperial Japanese Navy, 1941–1945. Annapolis, Maryland: Naval Institute Press. ISBN 0-87021-097-1.
- Hata, Ikuhiko; Izawa, Yasuho & Shores, Christopher (2011). Japanese Naval Air Force Fighter Units and Their Aces 1932–1945. London: Grub Street. ISBN 978-1-906502-84-3.
- Jentschura, Hansgeorg; Jung, Dieter & Mickel, Peter (1977). Warships of the Imperial Japanese Navy, 1869–1945. Annapolis, Maryland: United States Naval Institute. ISBN 0-87021-893-X.
- Lengerer, Hans (2014). "The IJN Light Carrier Ryujo". Warship 2014. London: Conway. pp. 129–145. ISBN 978-1-84486-236-8.
- Lundstrom, John B. (1994). The First Team and the Guadalcanal Campaign. Annapolis, Maryland: Naval Institute Press. ISBN 1-59114-472-8.
- Parshall, Jonathan & Tully, Anthony (2005). Shattered Sword: The Untold Story of the Battle of Midway. Dulles, Virginia: Potomac Books. ISBN 1-57488-923-0.
- Parshall, Jonathan; Tully, Anthony P. & Casse, Gilbert. "Ryujo". Kido Butai. Combinedfleet.com.
- Peattie, Mark (2001). Sunburst: The Rise of Japanese Naval Air Power 1909–1941. Annapolis, Maryland: Naval Institute Press. ISBN 1-55750-432-6.
- Preston, Antony (2002). The World's Worst Warships. London: Conway Maritime Press. ISBN 0-85177-754-6.
- Shores, Christopher; Cull, Brian & Izawa, Yasuho (1992). Bloody Shambles. Vol. I: The Drift to War to the Fall of Singapore. London: Grub Street. ISBN 0-948817-50-X.
- Shores, Christopher; Cull, Brian & Izawa, Yasuho (1993). Bloody Shambles. Vol. II: The Defence of Sumatra to the Fall of Burma. London: Grub Street. ISBN 0-948817-67-4.
- Silverstone, Paul H. (1984). Directory of the World's Capital Ships. New York: Hippocrene Books. ISBN 0-88254-979-0.
- Stille, Mark (2007). USN Carriers vs IJN Carriers: The Pacific 1942. Duel. Vol. 6. Oxford, UK: Osprey Publishing. ISBN 978-1-84603-248-6.
- Sturton, Ian (1980). "Japan". In Chesneau, Roger (ed.). Conway's All the World's Fighting Ships 1922–1946. Greenwich, UK: Conway Maritime Press. ISBN 0-85177-146-7.
- Tully, Anthony P. & Casse, Gilbert (March 2012). "IJN Ryujo: Tabular Record of Movement". Kido Butai. Combinedfleet.com.
