= 2nd Carrier Division =

Second Carrier Division
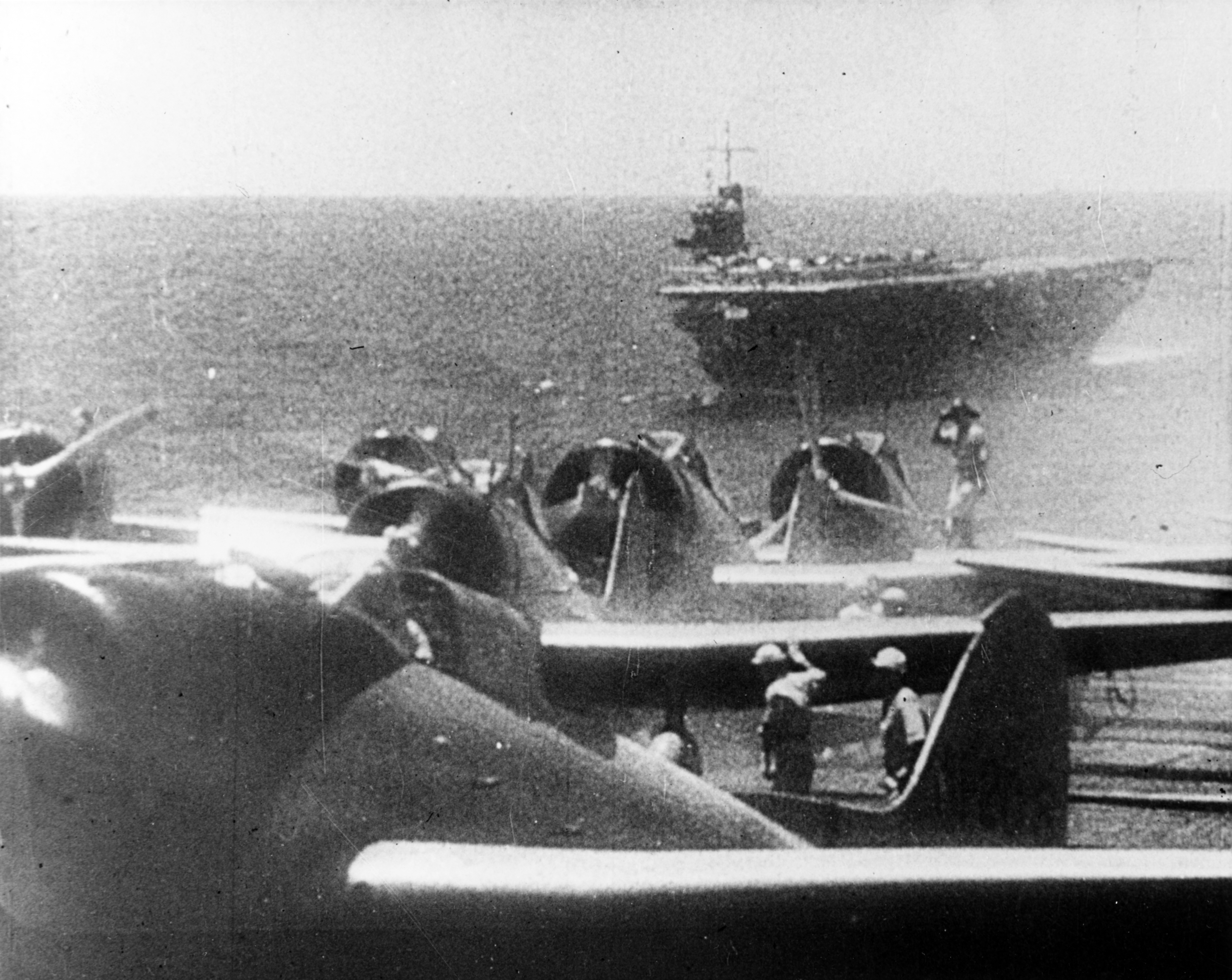
- Aircraft on the carriers Sōryū and Hiryū prepare to launch to attack Pearl Harbor in December 1941.
- Active: November 15, 1934 – July 10, 1944
- Country: Empire of Japan
- Allegiance: Axis Powers of World War II
- Branch: Imperial Japanese Navy
- Type: Naval aviation unit
- Role: Aircraft carrier support
- Engagements: Attack on Pearl Harbor; Battle of Wake Island; Bombing of Darwin; Indian Ocean Raid; Battle of Midway; Battle of the Santa Cruz Islands; Battle of the Philippine Sea

Commanders
- Notable commanders: Tamon Yamaguchi; Kakuji Kakuta

The Second Carrier Division (第二航空戦隊, Dai Ni Kōkū sentai, Ni Kōsen) was an aircraft carrier unit of the Imperial Japanese Navy's First Air Fleet. At the beginning of the Pacific Campaign of World War II, the Second Carrier Division consisted of the fleet carriers Sōryū and Hiryū. Both carriers were sunk at the Battle of Midway in June 1942 and were replaced by Jun'yō and Ryūjō.

== Organization (extract) ==
Date	Ships
15 November 1934 (original)	Akagi and Destroyer Squadron 2 : Minekaze, Okikaze
1 December 1936	Kaga and Destroyer Squadron 22 : Satsuki, Minazuki, Fumizuki, Nagatsuki
15 December 1938	Sōryū, Ryūjō and Destroyer Squadron 12 : Shinonome, Usugumo, Shirakumo, Murakumo
15 November 1939	Hiryū, Sōryū and Destroyer Squadron 11 : Fubuki, Shirayuki, Hatsuyuki
15 November 1940	Hiryū, Sōryū and Destroyer Squadron 23 : Kikuzuki, Mikazuki, Mochizuki, Yūzuki
14 July 1942	Jun'yō, Ryūjō
1 April 1943	Jun'yō, Hiyō, Ryūhō
10 July 1944	dissolved

== Commander ==
	Rank	Name	Date	Note
1	R.ADM	Eikichi Katagiri	15 November 1934	
2	Capt./R.ADM	Rokurō Horie	15 November 1935	Rear-Admiral on 1 December 1936
3	R.ADM	Nishizō Tsukahara	1 December 1937	
4	R.ADM	Teizō Mitsunami	15 December 1937	
5	R.ADM	Tomoshige Samejima	1 September 1938	
6	R.ADM	Michitaro Tozuka	20 October 1939	
7	R.ADM/V.ADM	Tamon Yamaguchi	1 November 1940	Vice-Admiral on 5 June 1942, KIA on 6 June 1942
8	R.ADM/V.ADM	Kakuji Kakuta	14 July 1942	Vice-Admiral on 1 November 1942
9	R.ADM	Munetaka Sakamaki	22 May 1943	
10	R.ADM	Takatsugu Jōjima	1 September 1943	
x		dissolved	10 July 1944	

== Bibliography ==
- The Maru Special series, "Ushio Shobō". (Japan)
- Ships of the World series, "Kaijinsha"., (Japan)
