= Index of Japan-related articles (J) =

This page lists Japan-related articles with romanized titles beginning with the letter J. For names of people, please list by surname (i.e., "Tarō Yamada" should be listed under "Y", not "T"). Please also ignore particles (e.g. "a", "an", "the") when listing articles (i.e., "A City with No People" should be listed under "City").

== J ==
- J. League
- J-Air
- J-pop
- Just Bring It (album)

== Ja ==
- Jakugo
- Jaleco
- JALways
- Jam Films
- Janken
- Japan
- Japan Academy Prize (academics)
- Japan Academy Prize (film)
- Japan Aerospace Exploration Agency
- Japan Air System
- Japanese kimono
- Japan Airlines
- Japan Air Lines Flight 123
- Japan Asia Airways
- Japan Australia Migratory Bird Agreement
- Japan Business Federation
- Japan Computer Access Network
- Japan Institute of Labour
- Japan Lutheran Church
- Japan Mennonite Brethren Conference
- Japan Meteorological Agency
- Japan on Foot
- Japan Post
- Japan Prize
- Japan Railway
- Japan Self-Defense Forces
- Japan Series
- Japan Standard Time
- The Japan Times
- Japan Tobacco
- Japan Transocean Air
- Japan Trench
- Japanese addressing system
- Japanese aircraft carrier Akagi
- Japanese aircraft carrier Hiryū
- Japanese aircraft carrier Hiyō
- Japanese aircraft carrier Hōshō
- Japanese aircraft carrier Junyō
- Japanese aircraft carrier Kaga
- Japanese aircraft carrier Shōhō
- Japanese aircraft carrier Shōkaku
- Japanese aircraft carrier Sōryū
- Japanese aircraft carrier Zuikaku
- Japanese aircraft carrier Zuihō
- Japanese Alps
- Japanese American
- Japanese American Internment
- Japanese angelica tree
- Japanese archery
- Japanese art
- Japanese Baseball Hall of Fame
- Japanese battleship Fusō
- Japanese battleship Haruna
- Japanese battleship Hiei
- Japanese battleship Hyūga
- Japanese battleship Ise
- Japanese battleship Kirishima
- Japanese battleship Kongo
- Japanese battleship Mikasa
- Japanese battleship Musashi
- Japanese battleship Mutsu
- Japanese battleship Nagato
- Japanese battleship Yamashiro
- Japanese battleship Yamato
- Japanese beetle
- Japanese black pine
- Japanese Bobtail
- Japanese bondage
- Japanese Buddhism
- Japanese bush warbler
- Japanese calendar
- Japanese calligraphy
- Japanese Canadian
- Japanese cell phone culture
- Japanese clans
- Japanese clothing
- Japanese Communist Party
- Japanese copyright law
- Japanese counter word
- Japanese crafts
- Japanese cruiser Haguro
- Japanese cruiser Izumo
- Japanese cruiser Kuma
- Japanese destroyer Ikazuchi
- Japanese dialects
- Japanese Dolls
- Japanese era name
- Japanese expansionism
- Japanese Experiment Module
- Japanese Cultural Festival
- Japanese festivals
- Japanese Foreign minister
- Japanese Funeral
- Japanese games
- 2000 Japanese general election
- 2003 Japanese general election
- Japanese grammar
- Japanese Grand Prix
- Japanese gunboat Akagi
- Japanese hip hop
- Japanese history textbook controversies
- Japanese honeysuckle
- Japanese Improvised Armored Train
- Japanese Industrial Standard
- Japanese input methods
- Japanese Instrument of Surrender
- Japanese invasions of Korea (1592-1598)
- Japanese kitchen knives
- Japanese knotweed
- Japanese-Korean disputes
- Japanese language
- Japanese language and computers
- Japanese Language Proficiency Test
- Japanese law
- Japanese literature
- Japanese macaque
- Japanese military aircraft designation systems
- Japanese military yen
- Japanese mythology
- Japanese name
- Japanese National Railways
- Japanese nationalism
- Japanese New Year
- Japanese numerals
- Japanese Orthodox Church
- Japanese Peace Bell
- Japanese people
- Japanese pottery
- Japanese proverbs
- Japanese Red Army
- Japanese Red Cross
- Japanese red pine
- Japanese robin
- Japanese rose
- Japanese ryō
- Japanese saw
- Japanese school uniform
- Japanese sea lion
- Japanese ship naming conventions
- Japanese sports
- Japanese submarine I-400
- Japanese submarine I-52 (1943)
- Japanese tea ceremony
- Japanese television programs
- Japanese titles
- Japanese toilet
- Japanese traditional dance
- Japanese TV dramas
- Japanese urban legends
- Japanese veterans in overseas interventions (1894–1927)
- Japanese war crimes
- Japanese white pine
- Japanese Wikipedia
- Japanese writing system
- Japanese yen
- Japonic languages

== Je ==
- Jean-François de Galaup, comte de La Pérouse
- Milia Fallyna Jenius
- JET Programme

== Ji ==
- Jidai Matsuri
- Jigglypuff
- Jigoro Kano
- Jikininki
- Jim Breen
- Jimi's Book of Japanese: A Motivating Method to Learn Japanese
- Jimokuji, Aichi
- Jingū-ji
- Jingū of Japan
- Jingū taima
- Jinseki District, Hiroshima
- Jinseki, Hiroshima
- Jirachi
- Jiro Watanabe
- JIS encoding
- Jito
- Jizo

== Jo ==
- Jō
- Jobo District, Okayama
- Jōchō
- Jōdō
- Jōdo-ji (Matsuyama)
- Jōdo-ji (Ono)
- Jōdo-ji (Onomichi)
- Jodo Shinshu
- Jōdo-shū
- Jōetsu
- Joetsu, Niigata
- Jōetsu Shinkansen
- Jōge, Hiroshima
- Jōhen, Ehime
- John Zegrus
- Joint Communiqué of the Government of Japan and the Government of the People's Republic of China
- Jojima, Fukuoka
- JoJo's Bizarre Adventure
- Jōkei (sculptor)
- Jōkyū War
- Jōmon period
- Jōnan, Kumamoto
- Josei
- Joseph Hardy Neesima
- Joso, Ibaraki
- Joyo, Fukuoka
- Joyo, Kyoto
- Jōyō kanji

== Jr ==
- JR Kobe Line
- JR Kyoto Line
- JR Namba Station

== Js ==
- JSL romanization

== Ju ==
- Ju-on
- Judo
- Jufuku-ji
- Jugemu
- Jujutsu
- Bishin Jumonji
- Jusenkyo
- Jushiyama, Aichi
- Jūsō Station
- Just In Time (business)
- Justice (short film)
- Juromaru

== Jv ==
- JVC
