= Mary King =

Mary King may refer to:

- Mary King (merchant) (c. 1590–1644), Scottish merchant and burgess
  - Mary King's Close, street in Edinburgh, Scotland, named after the above
- Mary King, née Alsop (1769–1819), American wife of Rufus King
- Mary King, white bride of African-American professor William G. Allen (1853)
- Mary Ward (scientist) (née King, 1827–1869), Irish naturalist, astronomer, microscopist, author, and artist
- Mary Alsop King Waddington (née King, 1833–1923), American author
- Mary King (teacher) (1884–1967), New Zealand teacher, principal, businesswoman, and political activist
- Mary King (news editor) (1885–1975), American news editor
- Mollie King (actress) (Mary Josephine King, 1895–1981), American actress
- Mary Lou King (born 1929), American environmental activist, educator, and writer
- Mary King (political scientist) (born 1940), American professor at the University of Peace, author, and non-violence activist
- Mary King (basketball) (fl. 1973–1982), American college basketball and tennis coach
- Mary King (equestrian) (born 1961), British equestrian and three-time Olympic medallist
- Mary King (economist), Trinidad and Tobago economist and senator
- Mary King, British participant in Japan on Foot
