= Mary Elizabeth King =

Mary Elizabeth King may refer to:

- Mary King (equestrian) (born 1961), British equestrian and three-time Olympic medallist
- Mary King (political scientist) (born 1940), American professor at the University of Peace, author, and non-violence activist

== See also ==
- Mary King (disambiguation)
