= Japanese aircraft carrier Shōhō =

Zuihō-class aircraft carrier

Coordinates: 16°07′14.17″S 151°54′47.02″E

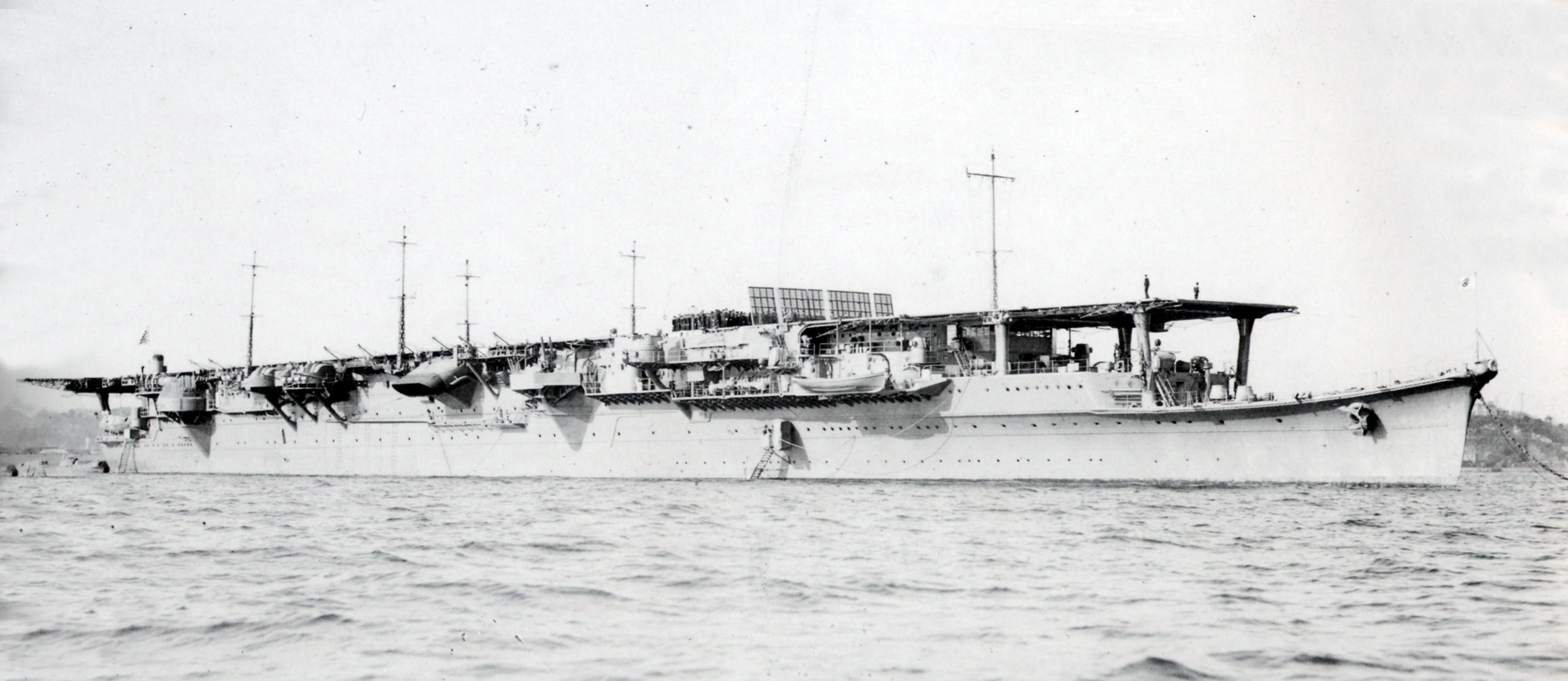
- Shōhō, 20 December 1941

History

Japan
- Name: Shōhō
- Namesake: Japanese: 祥鳳, "Auspicious Phoenix', or "Happy Phoenix"
- Builder: Yokosuka Naval Arsenal
- Laid down: 3 December 1934
- Launched: 1 June 1935
- Commissioned: 30 November 1941
- Fate: Sunk by air attack during the Battle of the Coral Sea, 7 May 1942

General characteristics (as converted)
- Class & type: Zuihō-class aircraft carrier
- Displacement: 11,443 t (11,262 long tons) (standard)
- Length: 205.5 m (674 ft 2 in)
- Beam: 18.2 m (59 ft 8 in)
- Draft: 6.6 m (21 ft 7 in)
- Installed power: 4 × boilers; 52,000 shp (39,000 kW)
- Propulsion: 2 × shafts; 2 × geared steam turbines
- Speed: 28 knots (52 km/h; 32 mph)
- Range: 7,800 nmi (14,400 km; 9,000 mi) at 18 knots (33 km/h; 21 mph)
- Complement: 785
- Armament: 4 × twin 12.7 cm/40 Type 89 guns; 4 × twin Type 96 25 mm anti-aircraft guns
- Aircraft carried: 30
- Aviation facilities: 2 × Aircraft elevators

Shōhō (Japanese: 祥鳳, "Auspicious Phoenix") was a light aircraft carrier of the Imperial Japanese Navy. Originally built as the submarine support ship Tsurugizaki (Japanese: 剣埼, "Sword Cape") in the late 1930s, she was converted before the Pacific War into an aircraft carrier and renamed. Completed in early 1942, the ship supported the invasion forces in Operation MO, the invasion of Port Moresby, New Guinea, and was sunk by American carrier aircraft on her first combat operation during the Battle of the Coral Sea on 7 May. Shōhō was the first Japanese aircraft carrier to be sunk during World War II.

== Design, construction and conversion ==
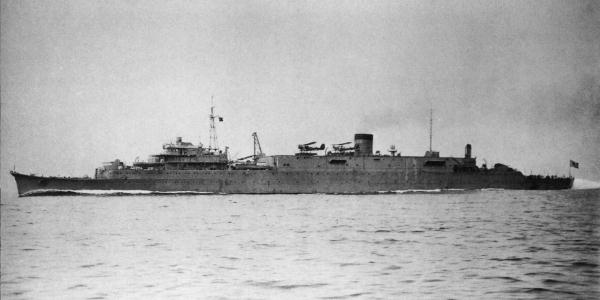
Tsurugisaki in 1939

Shōhō and her sister Zuihō were designed to be easily modified as an oil tanker, submarine tender, or aircraft carrier as needed. Shōhō was laid down by the Yokosuka Naval Arsenal on 3 December 1934 as the submarine tender Tsurugizaki. She was launched on 1 June 1935 and completed on 15 January 1939. Not long after the ship was initially completed, she began reconstruction as an aircraft carrier in 1941. Her superstructure was removed and replaced by a flight deck with a hangar for her aircraft below. Renamed Shōhō, the conversion was finished on 26 January 1942.

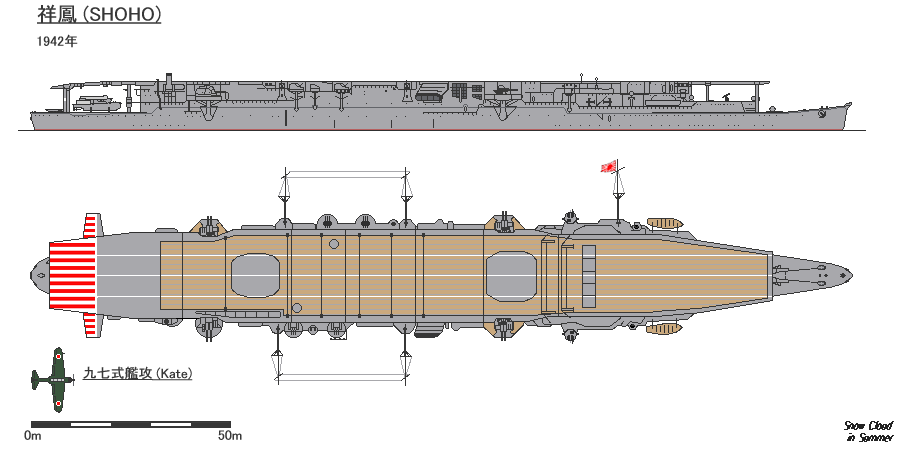
Schematic of Shōhō

After her conversion, Shōhō had a length of 205.5 meters (674 ft 2 in) overall. She had a beam of 18.2 meters (59 ft 8 in) and a draft of 6.58 meters (21 ft 7 in). She displaced 11,443 tonnes (11,262 long tons) at standard load. As part of her conversion, her original diesel engines, which had given her a top speed of 29 knots (54 km/h; 33 mph), were replaced by a pair of destroyer-type geared steam turbine sets with a total of 52,000 shaft horsepower (39,000 kW), each driving one propeller. Steam was provided by four Kampon water-tube boilers and Shōhō now had a maximum speed of 28 knots (52 km/h; 32 mph). The boilers exhausted through a single downturned starboard funnel and she carried 2,642 tonnes (2,600 long tons) of fuel oil, giving her a range of 7,800 nautical miles (14,400 km; 9,000 mi) at a speed of 18 knots (33 km/h; 21 mph). Her crew numbered 785 officers and men.

Shōhō's flight deck was 180 meters (590 ft 6 in) long and had a maximum width of 23 meters (75 ft 6 in). The ship was designed with a single hangar 124 meters (406 ft 10 in) long and 18 meters (59 ft) wide. The hangar was served by two octagonal centerline aircraft elevators. The forward elevator was 13 by 12 metres (42 ft 8 in by 39 ft 4 in) in size and the smaller rear elevator measured 12 by 10.8 metres (39 ft 4 in by 35 ft 5 in). She had arresting gear with six cables, but she was not fitted with an aircraft catapult. Shōhō was a flush-deck design and lacked an island superstructure. She was designed to operate 30 aircraft.

The ship's primary armament consisted of eight 40-caliber 12.7 cm Type 89 anti-aircraft (AA) guns in twin mounts on sponsons along the sides of the hull. Shōhō was also initially equipped with four twin 25 mm Type 96 light AA guns, also in sponsons along the sides of the hull.

== Service history ==
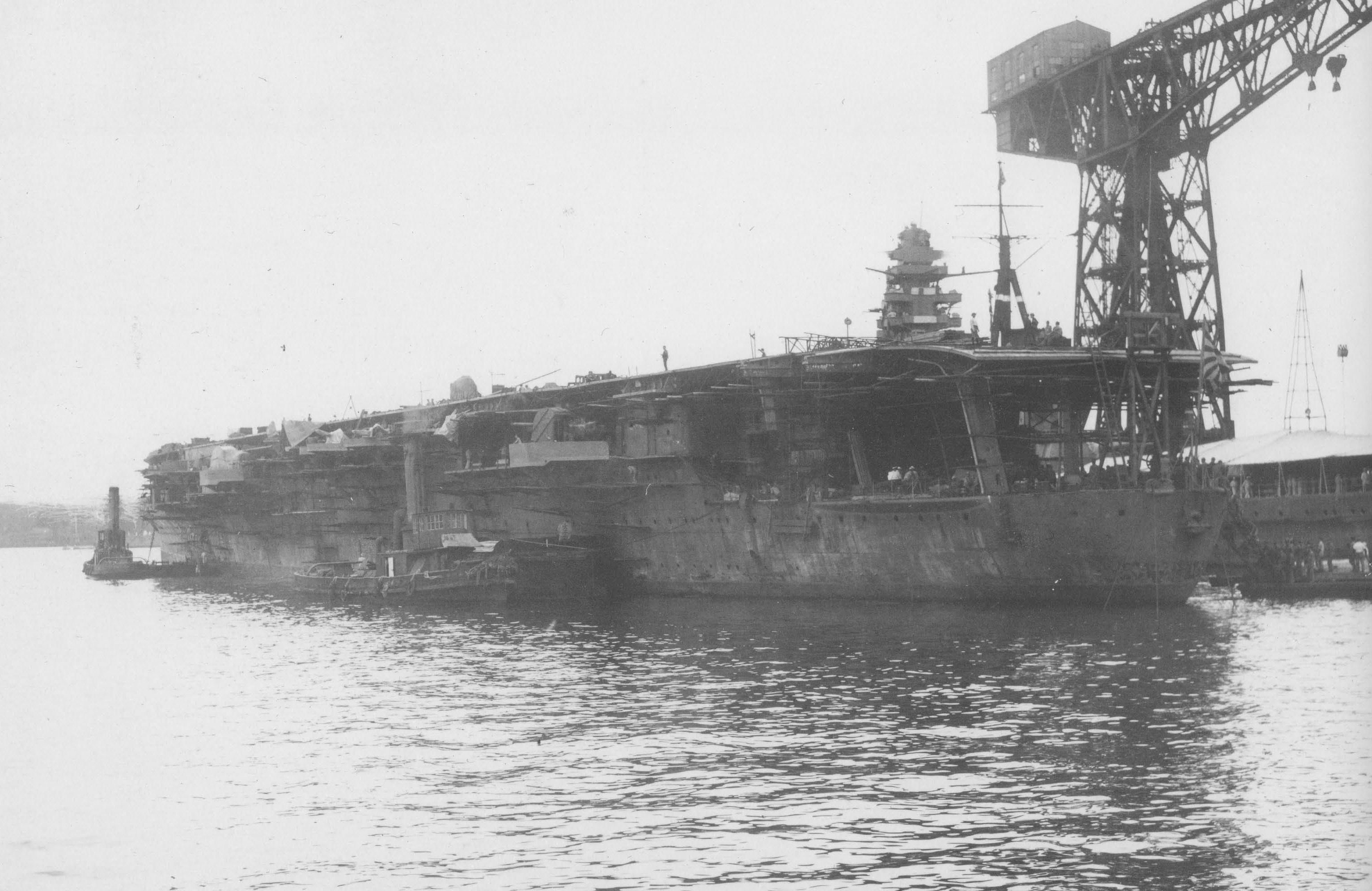
Shōhō undergoing conversion into a light carrier, 2 September 1941

Shōhō was commissioned on 30 November 1941 and Captain Ishinosuke Izawa became her commanding officer. While still fitting-out, the ship was assigned to the Fourth Carrier Division of the 1st Air Fleet on 22 December. On 4 February 1942, she ferried aircraft to Truk, where she remained until 11 April before returning to Yokosuka.

In late April 1942, Shōhō was assigned to Operation MO and arrived in Truk on 29 April. The following day, she departed Truk with the cruisers Aoba, Kinugasa, Furutaka, and Kako of Cruiser Division 6 under the command of Rear Admiral Aritomo Gotō. They formed the Main Force of the operation. Due to aircraft shortages, her aircraft complement consisted of only four obsolete Mitsubishi A5M4 "Claude" and eight modern Mitsubishi A6M2 "Zero" fighters plus six Nakajima B5N2 "Kate" torpedo bombers. Covering the other elements of Operation MO was the Striking Force that consisted of the fleet carriers Shōkaku and Zuikaku.

=== Battle of the Coral Sea ===
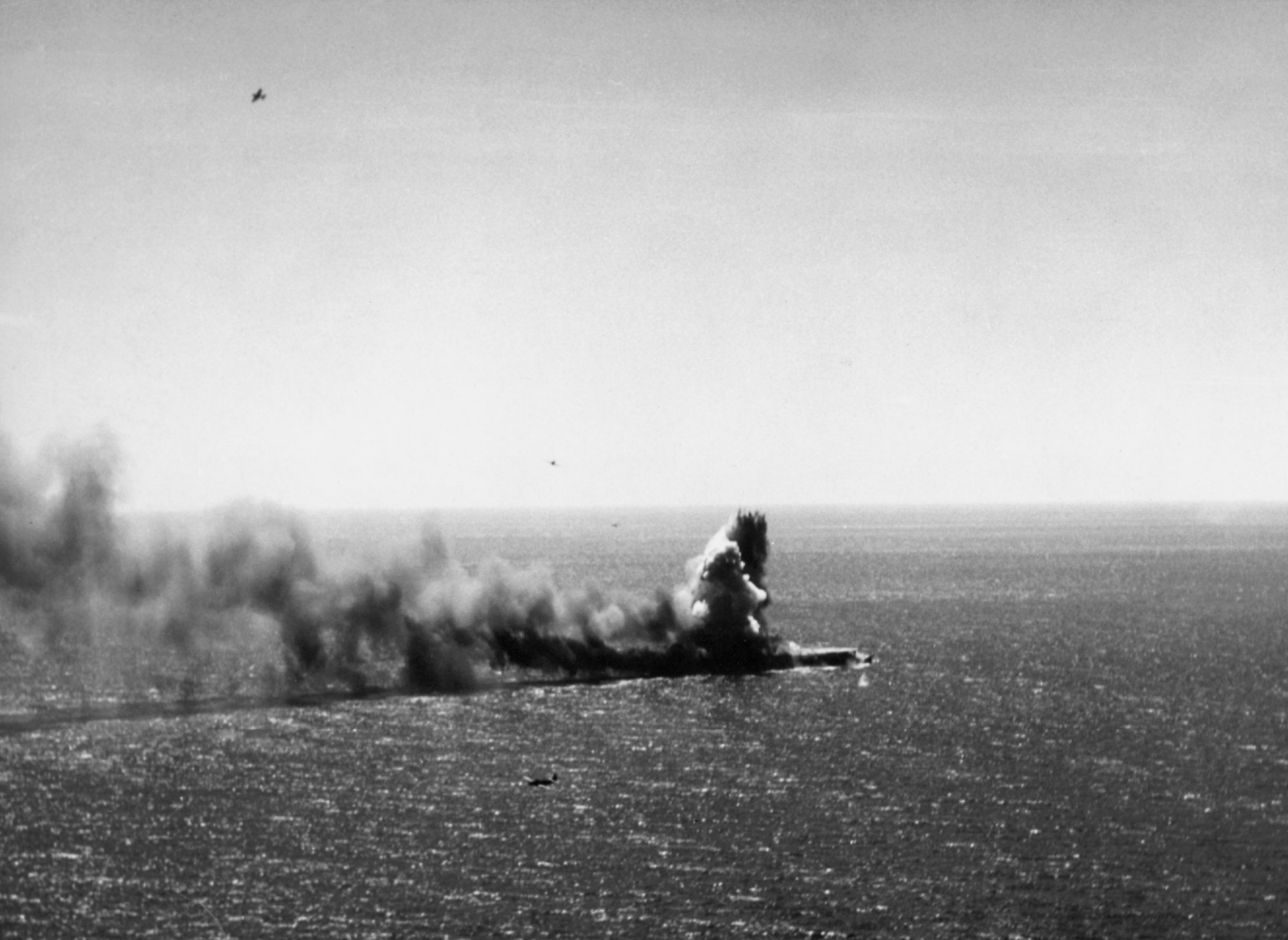
A 1,000-pound (450 kg) bomb detonates on Shōhō during the Battle of the Coral Sea

After covering the landings on Tulagi on 3 May, Shōhō headed north to cover the invasion convoy the next day and was not present when aircraft from the American carrier Yorktown attacked Japanese shipping at Tulagi. This air strike confirmed that at least one American carrier was in the vicinity, but the Japanese had no idea of its location. They launched a number of reconnaissance aircraft the following day to search for the Americans, but without result. One Kawanishi H6K "Mavis" flying boat spotted Yorktown, but was shot down by one of Yorktown's Grumman F4F Wildcat fighters before she could radio a report. US Army Air Forces (USAAF) aircraft spotted Shōhō (Note: Her name was mistransliterated by the Americans as Ryukaku.) southwest of Bougainville Island on 5 May, but she was too far north to be attacked by the American carriers, which were refueling. That day, Rear Admiral Frank Jack Fletcher received Magic intelligence that placed the three Japanese carriers known to be involved in Operation MO near Bougainville, and predicted 10 May as the date of the invasion. It also predicted airstrikes by the Japanese carriers in support of the invasion several days before 10 May. Based on this information, Fletcher planned to complete refuelling his ships on 6 May and move closer to the eastern tip of New Guinea to be in a position to locate and attack Japanese forces on 7 May.

Another H6K spotted the Americans during the morning of 6 May and successfully shadowed them until 14:00. The Japanese, however, were unwilling or unable to launch air strikes in poor weather or without updated spot reports. Both sides believed they knew where the other force was, and expected to fight the next day. The Japanese were the first to spot the Americans when one aircraft found the oiler Neosho escorted by the destroyer Sims at 0722, south of the Strike Force. These ships were misidentified as a carrier and a cruiser and the carriers Shōkaku and Zuikaku launched an airstrike 40 minutes later that sank Sims and damaged Neosho badly enough that she had to be scuttled a few days later. The American carriers were west of the Strike Force, not south, and they were spotted by other Japanese aircraft shortly after the carriers had launched their attack on Neosho and Sims.

American reconnaissance aircraft reported two Japanese heavy cruisers northeast of Misima Island in the Louisiade Archipelago off the eastern tip of New Guinea at 07:35 and two carriers at 08:15. An hour later, Fletcher ordered an airstrike launched, believing that the two carriers reported were Shōkaku and Zuikaku. Lexington and Yorktown launched a total of 53 Douglas SBD Dauntless dive bombers and 22 Douglas TBD Devastator torpedo planes escorted by 18 F4F Wildcats. The 0815 report turned out to be miscoded, as the pilot had intended to report two heavy cruisers, but USAAF aircraft had spotted Shōhō, her escorts and the invasion convoy in the meantime. As the latest spot report plotted only 30 nautical miles (56 km; 35 mi) away from the 0815 report, the aircraft en route were diverted to this new target.

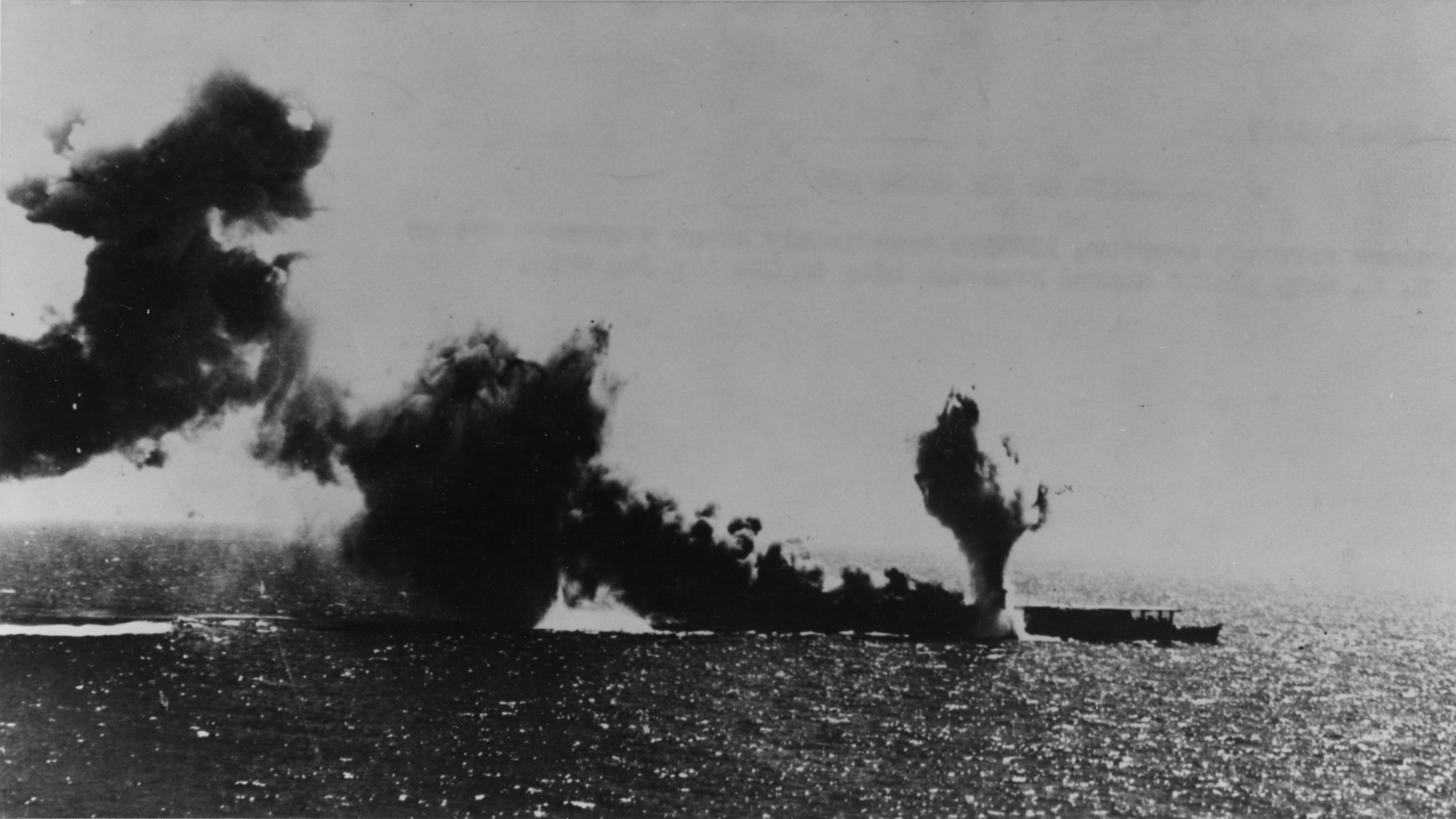
Shōhō hit by a torpedo launched by a Devastator from Lexington

Shōhō and the rest of the Main Force were spotted by aircraft from Lexington at 10:40. At this time, Shōhō's combat air patrol (CAP) consisted of two A5Ms and one A6M Zero. The Dauntlesses began their attack at 11:10 as the three Japanese fighters attacked them in their dive. None of the dive bombers hit Shōhō, which was maneuvering to avoid their bombs; one Dauntless was shot down by the Zero after it had pulled out of its dive and several others were damaged. The carrier launched three more Zeros immediately after this attack to reinforce its CAP. The second wave of Dauntlesses began their attack at 11:18 and they hit Shōhō twice with 1,000-pound (450 kg) bombs. These penetrated the ship's flight deck and burst inside her hangars, setting the fuelled and armed aircraft there on fire. A minute later, the Devastators began dropping their torpedoes from both sides of the ship. They hit Shōhō five times and the damage from the hits knocked out her steering and power and flooded both engine and boiler rooms. Yorktown's aircraft trailed those from Lexington, and the former's Dauntlesses began their attacks at 11:25, hitting Shōhō with another eleven 1,000-pound bombs by Japanese accounts and the carrier came to a complete stop. Yorktown's Devastators trailed the rest of her aircraft and attacked at 11:29. They claimed ten hits, although Japanese accounts acknowledge only two. As the Devastators were exiting the area, they were attacked by the CAP, but the Wildcats protecting the torpedo bombers shot down two A5Ms and an A6M Zero. Total American losses to all causes were three Dauntlesses. After his attack, Lieutenant Commander Robert E. Dixon, commander of Lexington's dive bombers, radioed his famous message to the American carriers: "Scratch one flat top!"

With Shōhō hit by no fewer than 13 bombs and 7 torpedoes, Captain Izawa ordered the ship abandoned at 11:31. She sank four minutes later. Some 300 men successfully abandoned the ship, but they had to wait to be rescued as Gotō ordered his remaining ships to head north at high speed to avoid any further airstrikes. Around 14:00, he ordered the destroyer Sazanami to return to the scene and rescue the survivors. She found only 203, including Captain Izawa. The rest of her crew of 834 died during the attack or in the water awaiting rescue. Shōhō was the first Japanese aircraft carrier lost during the war.
