= Zuihō-class aircraft carrier =

Japanese light aircraft carriers class

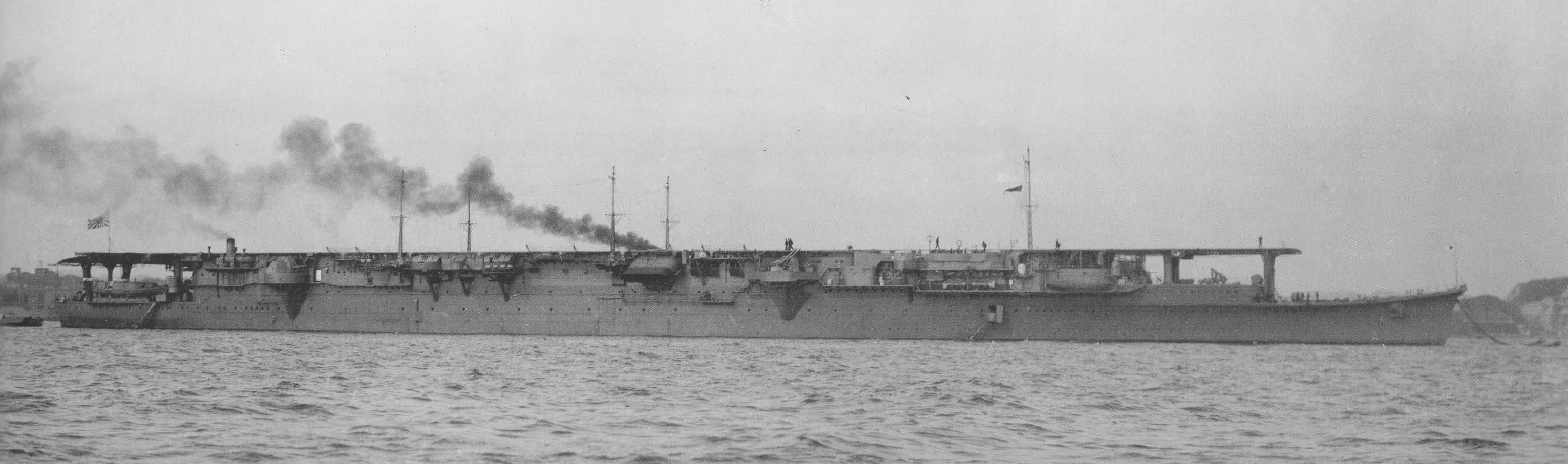
- Shōhō at anchor at Yokosuka, December 1941

Class overview
- Name: Zuihō-class aircraft carrier
- Operators: Imperial Japanese Navy
- In commission: 30 September 1937–mid-1941 (as submarine tenders); 27 December 1940 – 25 October 1944 (as aircraft carriers)
- Completed: 2
- Lost: 2

General characteristics (as built)
- Type: Light aircraft carrier
- Displacement: 11,443 tonnes (11,262 long tons) (standard)
- Length: 205.5 m (674 ft 2 in)
- Beam: 18.2 m (59 ft 8 in)
- Draft: 6.58 m (21 ft 7 in)
- Installed power: 52,000 shp (39,000 kW); 4 × boilers
- Propulsion: 2 × shafts; 2 × geared steam turbines
- Speed: 28 knots (52 km/h; 32 mph)
- Range: 7,800 nmi (14,400 km; 9,000 mi) at 18 knots (33 km/h; 21 mph)
- Complement: 785
- Armament: 4 × twin 12.7 cm (5 in) AA guns; 4 × twin 25 mm (1 in) AA guns
- Aircraft carried: 30

The Zuihō class (瑞鳳型), also known as the Shōhō class (祥鳳型), consisted of two aircraft carriers built for the Imperial Japanese Navy (IJN) before World War II, the Zuihō and Shōhō. Both ships were originally built as submarine tenders, but were subsequently converted into carriers. Completed in early 1942, Shōhō supported the invasion forces in Operation MO, the invasion of Port Moresby, New Guinea, and was sunk by American carrier aircraft on her first combat operation during the Battle of the Coral Sea on 7 May. Shōhō was the first Japanese aircraft carrier to be sunk during World War II. Zuihō played a secondary role in the Battle of Midway in mid-1942 and did not engage any American aircraft or ships during the battle. The ship participated in the Guadalcanal campaign during the rest of 1942. She was lightly damaged during the Battle of the Santa Cruz Islands during this campaign and covered the evacuation of Japanese forces from the island in early 1943 after repairs.

Afterwards, her aircraft were disembarked several times in mid to late 1943 and used from land bases in a number of battles in the South West Pacific. Zuihō participated in the Philippine Sea and Leyte Gulf in mid-1944. In this last battle, Zuihō mainly served as a decoy for the main striking forces and she was finally sunk by American aircraft fulfilling her task. In between engagements, the ship served as a ferry carrier and a training ship.

== Design, construction and conversion ==
In the mid-1930s, the Imperial Japanese Navy decided to build a class of two submarine tenders which could be converted into light aircraft carriers or fleet oilers. The first ship, Tsurugizaki, was commissioned into service in 1939. Construction of the second, Takasaki, was stopped soon after launch and she was completed as an aircraft carrier. The ship was commissioned as Zuiho in December 1940. In early 1941, Tsurugizaki was taken out of service, converted to an aircraft carrier, and recommissioned as Shōhō in early 1942.

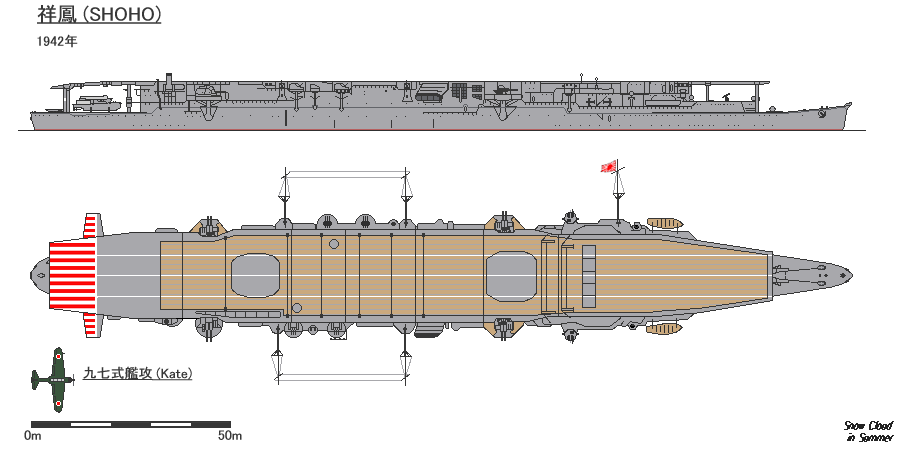
Schematic of Shōhō

After their conversion, the ships had a length of 205.5 meters (674 ft 2 in) overall. They had a beam of 18.2 m (59 ft 8 in) and a draft of 6.58 m (21 ft 7 in). They displaced 11,443 tonnes (11,262 long tons) at standard load. As part of their conversion, their original diesel engines, which had given them a top speed of 29 knots (54 km/h; 33 mph), were replaced by a pair of destroyer-type geared steam turbine sets with a total of 52,000 shaft horsepower (39,000 kW), each driving one propeller. Steam was provided by four Kampon water-tube boilers and they now had a maximum speed of 28 knots (52 km/h; 32 mph). The boilers exhausted through a single downturned starboard funnel and the ships carried 2,642 tonnes (2,600 long tons) of fuel oil, giving them a range of 7,800 nautical miles (14,400 km; 9,000 mi) at a speed of 18 knots (33 km/h; 21 mph). Their crew numbered 785 officers and men.

Their flight deck was 180 m (590 ft 6 in) long and had a maximum width of 23 m (75 ft 6 in). The ships were designed with a single hangar 124 m (406 ft 10 in) long and 18 m (59 ft) wide. The hangar was served by two octagonal centerline aircraft elevators. The forward elevator was 13 by 12 meters (42 ft 8 in × 39 ft 4 in) in size and the smaller rear elevator measured 12 by 10.8 meters (39 ft 4 in × 35 ft 5 in). The ships had arresting gear with six cables, but they were not fitted with an aircraft catapult. The Zuihō-class carriers were a flush-deck design and lacked an island superstructure. They were designed to operate 30 aircraft.

The primary armament consisted of eight 40-caliber 12.7 cm Type 89 anti-aircraft (AA) guns in twin mounts on sponsons along the sides of the hull. They fired 23.45-kilogram (51.7 lb) projectiles at a rate between 8 and 14 rounds per minute at a muzzle velocity of 700–725 m/s (2,300–2,380 ft/s); at 45°, this provided a maximum range of 14,800 meters (16,200 yd), and a maximum ceiling of 9,400 meters (30,800 ft). The ships were also initially equipped with four twin 25 mm Type 96 light AA guns, also in sponsons along the sides of the hull. They fired .25-kilogram (0.55 lb) projectiles at a muzzle velocity of 900 m/s (3,000 ft/s); at 50°, this provided a maximum range of 7,500 meters (8,202 yd), and an effective ceiling of 5,500 meters (18,000 ft). The maximum effective rate of fire was only between 110 and 120 rounds per minute due to the frequent need to change the fifteen-round magazines. In 1943, Zuihō's light AA armament was increased to 48 twenty-five mm guns. The following year, an additional twenty 25 mm guns were added in addition to six 28-round AA rocket launchers. Each 12-centimeter (4.7 in) rocket weighed 22.5 kilograms (50 lb) and had a maximum velocity of 200 m/s (660 ft/s). Their maximum range was 4,800 meters (5,200 yd).

== Ships ==
Construction data
Name	Builder	Laid down	Launched	Commissioned	Fate
Zuihō (瑞鳳)	Yokosuka Naval Arsenal	20 June 1935	19 June 1936	27 December 1940	Sunk during the Battle off Cape Engaño, 25 October 1944
Shōhō (祥鳳)	Yokosuka Naval Arsenal	3 December 1934	1 June 1935	15 January 1939	Sunk during the Battle of the Coral Sea, 7 May 1942

== Service ==
After commissioning, Zuihō remained in Japanese waters until late 1941, becoming the flagship of the Third Carrier Division on 30 September. Together with the carrier Hōshō and eight battleships, Zuihō covered the return of the ships of the 1st Air Fleet as they returned from the attack on Pearl Harbor in mid-December. Aside from one trip to transport aircraft to the Philippines, she remained in Japanese waters until June 1942.

While still fitting-out, Shōhō was assigned to the Fourth Carrier Division of the 1st Air Fleet on 22 December 1941. On 4 February 1942, she ferried aircraft to Truk, where she remained until 11 April before returning to Yokosuka. In late April 1942, Shōhō was assigned to Operation MO and arrived in Truk on 29 April. The following day, she departed Truk in company with four heavy cruisers and they formed the Main Force of the operation. Due to aircraft shortages, her aircraft complement consisted of only four obsolete Mitsubishi A5M "Claude" and eight modern Mitsubishi A6M2 "Zero" fighters plus six Nakajima B5N2 "Kate" torpedo bombers. Covering the other elements of Operation MO was the Striking Force that consisted of the fleet carriers Shōkaku and Zuikaku.

=== Coral Sea, Midway, and Guadalcanal ===
After covering the landings on Tulagi on 3 May, Shōhō headed north to cover the invasion convoy the next day and was not present when aircraft from the American carrier Yorktown attacked Japanese shipping at Tulagi. This air strike confirmed that at least one American carrier was in the vicinity, but the Japanese had no idea of its location. They launched a number of reconnaissance aircraft the following day to search for the Americans, but without result. US Army Air Force (USAAF) aircraft spotted Shōhō (Note: Her name was mistransliterated by the Americans as Ryukaku.) southwest of Bougainville Island on 5 May, but she was too far north to be attacked by the American carriers, which were refueling. That day, Rear Admiral Frank Jack Fletcher received Magic intelligence that placed the three Japanese carriers known to be involved in Operation MO near Bougainville, and predicted 10 May as the date of the invasion. It also predicted airstrikes by the Japanese carriers in support of the invasion several days before 10 May. Based on this information, Fletcher planned to complete refueling his ships on 6 May and move closer to the eastern tip of New Guinea to be in a position to locate and attack Japanese forces on 7 May.

American reconnaissance aircraft reported two Japanese heavy cruisers northeast of Misima Island in the Louisiade Archipelago off the eastern tip of New Guinea at 0735 and two carriers at 0815 on 7 May. An hour later Fletcher ordered an airstrike launched, believing that the two carriers reported were Shōkaku and Zuikaku. Lexington and Yorktown launched a total of 53 Douglas SBD Dauntless dive bombers and 22 Douglas TBD Devastator torpedo bombers escorted by 18 F4F Wildcats. The 0815 report turned out to be miscoded, as the pilot had intended to report two heavy cruisers, but USAAF aircraft had spotted Shōhō, her escorts and the invasion convoy in the meantime. As the latest spot report plotted only 30 nautical miles (56 km; 35 mi) away from the 0815 report, the aircraft en route were diverted to this new target.

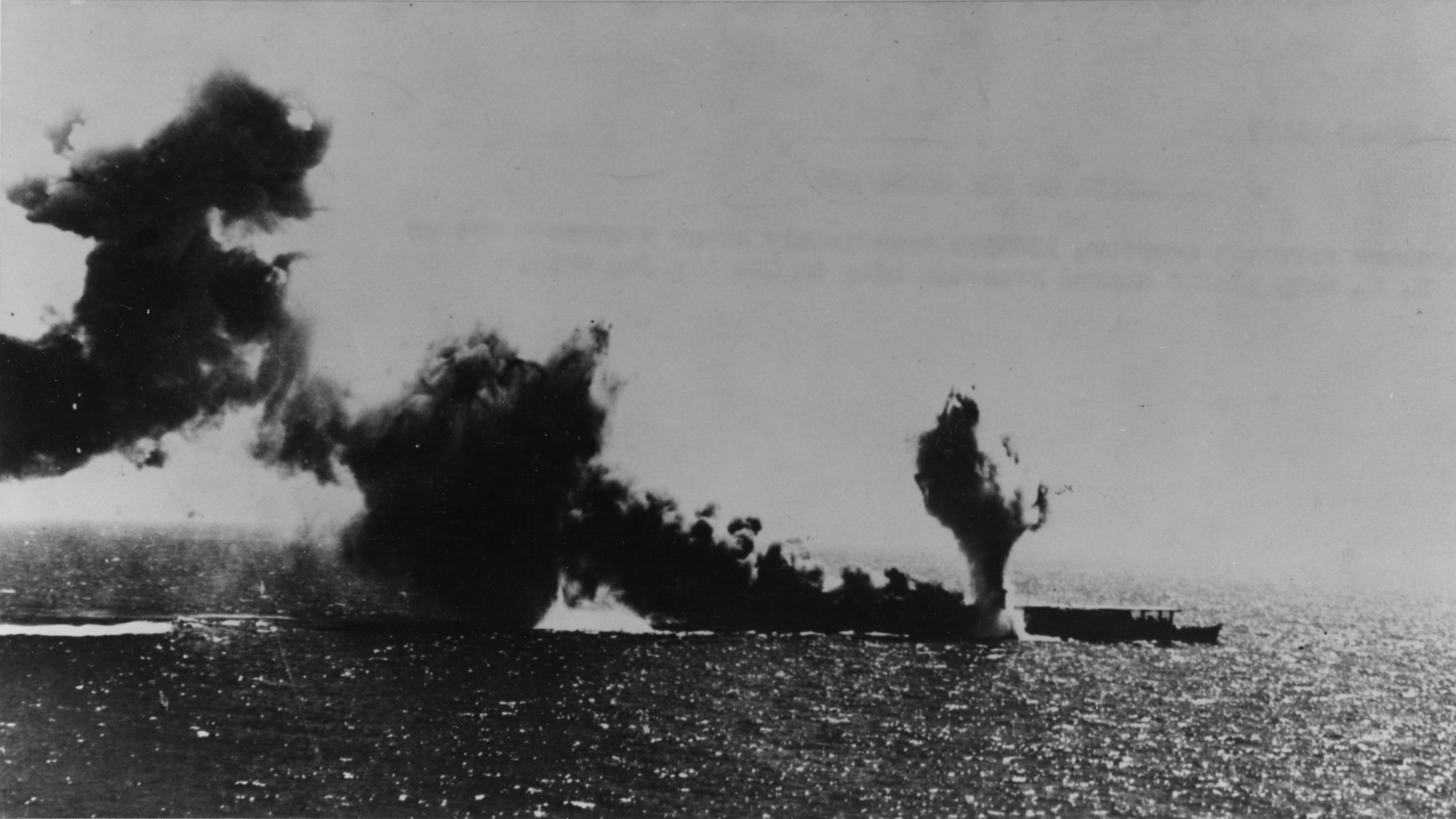
Shōhō hit by a torpedo launched by a Devastator from the Lexington

Shōhō and the rest of the Main Force were spotted by aircraft from Lexington at 1040. At this time, Shōhō's combat air patrol (CAP) consisted of two A5Ms and one A6M Zero. The first dive bomber attacks all missed and the CAP shot down one Dauntless after it had dropped its bomb. The second squadron of Dauntlesses followed shortly afterwards and they hit Shōhō twice with 1,000-pound (450 kg) bombs. These penetrated the ship's flight deck and burst inside her hangars, setting the fueled and armed aircraft there on fire. A minute later the Devastators of VT-2 began dropping their torpedoes from both sides of the ship. They hit Shōhō five times and the damage from the hits knocked out her steering and power. In addition, the hits flooded both engine and boiler rooms. Yorktown's aircraft delivered the coup de grace with another eleven hits from 1000-pound bombs in addition to two more torpedo hits. After his attack, Lieutenant Commander Robert E. Dixon, commander of VS-2, radioed his famous message to the American carriers: "Scratch one flat top!"

Shōhō was ordered abandoned at 1131 and sank four minutes later. Some 300 men successfully abandoned the ship, but they had to await rescue as the remaining ships of the Main Force headed north at high speed to avoid any further airstrikes. Around 1400, the destroyer Sazanami returned to the scene and rescued only 203 survivors, the rest of her crew of 834 died during the attack or in the water awaiting rescue. Shōhō was the first Japanese aircraft carrier lost during the war.

Zuihō led the Support Fleet during the Battle of Midway and did not engage American carriers directly. Her aircraft complement consisted of six Mitsubishi A5M "Claude" and six Mitsubishi A6M2 "Zero" fighters, and twelve Nakajima B5N2 "Kate" torpedo bombers. After a brief refit in July–August, the ship was assigned to First Carrier Division with Shōkaku and Zuikaku on 12 August.

The division sailed to Truk on 1 October to support Japanese forces in the Guadalcanal Campaign and left Truk on 11 October based on the promise of the Japanese Army to capture Henderson Field on Guadalcanal. At this time, Zuihō carried 18 A6Ms and 6 B5Ns. The Japanese and American carrier forces discovered each other in the early morning of 26 October during the Battle of the Santa Cruz Islands and each side launched air strikes. The aircraft passed each other en route and nine of Zuihō's Zeros attacked the aircraft launched by the USS Enterprise. They shot down three each Grumman F4F Wildcat fighters and Grumman TBF Avenger torpedo bombers and damaged one more of each type while losing four of their own. Two of Enterprise's Douglas SBD Dauntless dive bombers hit Zuihō with 500-pound (230 kg) bombs and damaged her flight deck enough that she could not conduct flight operations although she was not seriously damaged otherwise. Together with the damaged Shōkaku, the ship withdrew from the battle and reached Truk two days later. After temporary repairs, the two carriers returned to Japan in early November and Zuihō's repairs were completed on 16 December.

The ship left Kure on 17 January 1943 and sailed for Truk with a load of aircraft. Upon arrival she was assigned to the Second Carrier Division to provide cover for the evacuation of Guadalcanal, along with Jun'yō and Zuikaku, later in the month and in early February. Zuihō arrived at Sasebo on 9 May and received a brief refit in mid-June. She returned to Truk on 15 July and remained in the area until 5 November when she returned to Yokosuka. By this time, Zuihō was assigned to the First Carrier Division with Shōkaku and Zuikaku and they sailed for Eniwetok Atoll on 18 September for training and to be in position to intercept any attacks by American carriers in the vicinity of Wake Island and the Marshall Islands area. That day the American carriers raided the Gilbert Islands and were gone by the time the Japanese reached Eniwetok on 20 September.

On 30 November, Zuihō, together with the escort carriers Chūyō and Unyō, departed Truk for Japan, escorted by four destroyers. The Americans had cracked the Japanese naval codes and positioned several submarines along their route to Yokosuka. Skate unsuccessfully attacked Zuihō on 30 November, while Sailfish torpedoed and sank Chūyō five days later with heavy loss of life. From December to May 1944, Zuihō ferried aircraft and supplies to Truk and Guam although she was reassigned to the Third Carrier Division on 29 January, together with the converted carriers Chitose and Chiyoda. Each of the three carriers was intended to be equipped with 21 fighters and 9 torpedo bombers, but this plan was changed on 15 February to a consolidated air group, the 653rd, that controlled the aircraft of all three carriers. While fully equipped by May with 18 Zero fighters, 45 Zero fighter-bombers, 18 B5Ns, and 9 Nakajima B6N "Jill" torpedo bombers, the air group's pilots were largely drawn from the two most recent classes and lacked experience. The ship sailed for Tawi-Tawi on 11 May in the Philippines. The new base was closer to the oil wells in Borneo on which the Navy relied and also to the Palau and western Caroline Islands where the Japanese expected the next American attack. However, the location lacked an airfield on which to train the green pilots and American submarines were very active in the vicinity which restricted the ships to the anchorage.

=== Battle of the Philippine Sea ===
The 1st Mobile Fleet was en route to Guimares Island in the central Philippines on 13 June, where they intended to practice carrier operations in an area better protected from submarines, when Vice Admiral Jisaburō Ozawa learned of the American attack on the Mariana Islands the previous day. Upon reaching Guimares, the fleet refueled and sortied into the Philippine Sea where they spotted Task Force 58 on 18 June. The Americans failed to locate Ozawa's ships that day and the Japanese turned south to maintain a constant distance between them and the American carriers as Ozawa had decided on launching his air strikes early the following morning. He had deployed his forces in a "T"- shaped formation with the 3rd Carrier Division at the end of the stem, 115 nautical miles (213 km; 132 mi) ahead of the 1st and 2nd Carrier Divisions that formed the crossbar of the "T". Zuihō and her consorts were intended to draw the attentions of the Americans while the other carriers conducted their air strikes without disruption. The first wave of search aircraft spotted one group of four carriers from Task Force 58 at 0734 and the Japanese carriers launched their aircraft an hour later. This consisted of 43 Zero fighter-bombers and 7 B6Ns, escorted by 14 A6M5 fighters; the carriers retained only three fighters, two fighter-bombers, two B6Ns and two B5Ns for self-defense and later searches. While the air strike was still forming up, the second wave of searchers located Task Force 58's battleships and the air strike was diverted to attack them. The Americans detected the incoming Japanese aircraft and had a total of 199 Grumman F6F Hellcat fighters in the air by the time the Japanese aircraft were in range of the American ships. The defending fighters decimated the Japanese aircraft and only 21 survived, doing little damage to the American ships. Some of the surviving Japanese aircraft landed at Guam while others, including the five surviving B6Ns, returned to their carriers where they claimed one carrier definitely damaged and another probably hit.

At dusk, the Japanese turned away to the northwest to regroup and to refuel and the Americans turned west to close the distance. Both sides launched aircraft the next day to locate each other; Zuihō launched three aircraft at 1200 to search east of the fleet, but they did not discover the Americans. The Americans discovered the retiring Japanese fleet during the afternoon and Vice Admiral Marc Mitscher ordered an air strike launched. While they sank one Japanese carrier and damaged two others, Zuihō was not attacked and successfully disengaged that evening. By the end of the battle, Air Group 653 was reduced to two Zero fighters, three Zero fighter-bombers and six torpedo bombers. After reaching Japan on 1 July, the ship remained in Japanese waters until October, training replacements for her air group.

=== Battle of Leyte Gulf ===
After the Americans attacked the Philippines, Formosa and the Ryukyu Islands beginning on 10 October, the Japanese implemented their plan for the defense of these areas that required the transfer of most of Air Group 652 to Formosa and Luzon to attack the American forces, with only a few aircraft retained for carrier operations. Most of these aircraft were lost for little gain as the Americans suppressed Japanese defenses in the Philippines, preparatory to the actual invasion.

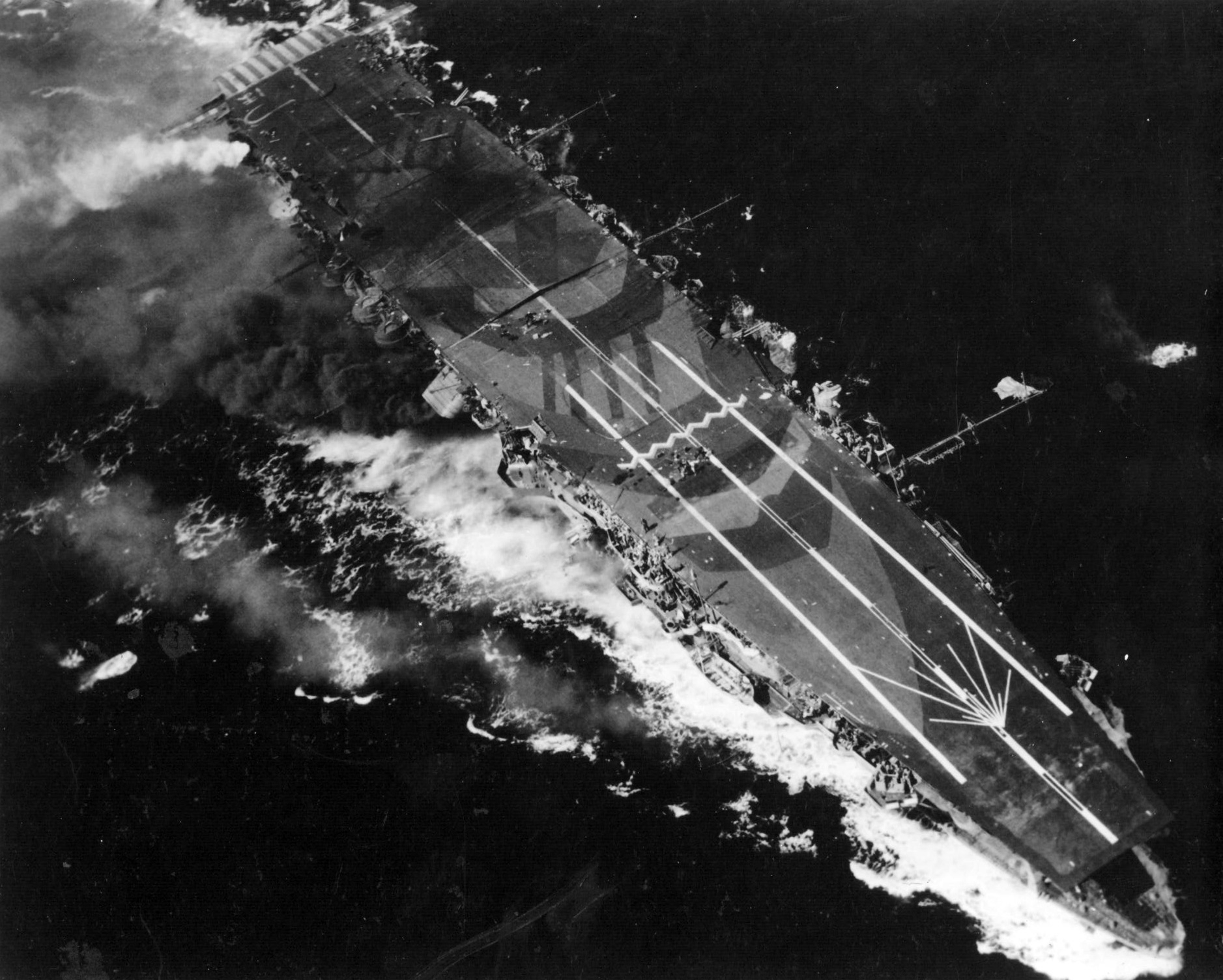
Zuihō under attack during the Battle off Cape Engaño on 25 October 1944

On 18 October, Admiral Soemu Toyoda activated the naval portion of the defense plan after receiving reports of the landings on Leyte. Zuihō's role, together with Chiyoda, Chitose, Zuikaku and the rest of the Main Body of the 1st Mobile Fleet, approaching Leyte Gulf from the north, was to serve as decoys to attraction away from the two other forces approaching from the south and west. All forces were to converge on Leyte Gulf on 25 October and the Main Body left Japan on 20 October. As decoys, the carriers were only provided with a total of 116 aircraft: 52 Zero fighters, 28 Zero fighter-bombers, 7 Yokosuka D4Y "Judy" dive bombers, 26 B6N and 4 B5N torpedo bombers. By the morning of 24 October, the Main Body was within range of the northernmost American carriers of Task Force 38 and Admiral Ozawa ordered an air strike launched to attract the attention of the Americans. This accomplished little else as the Japanese aircraft failed to penetrate past the defending fighters; the survivors landed at airfields on Luzon. The Americans were preoccupied dealing with the other Japanese naval forces and defending themselves from air attacks launched from Luzon and Leyte and could not spare any aircraft to search for the Japanese carriers until the afternoon. They finally found them at 1605, but Admiral William Halsey, Jr., commander of Task Force 38, decided that it was too late in the day to mount an effective strike. He did, however, turn all of his ships north to position himself for a dawn attack on the Japanese carriers the next day in what came to be called the Battle off Cape Engaño.

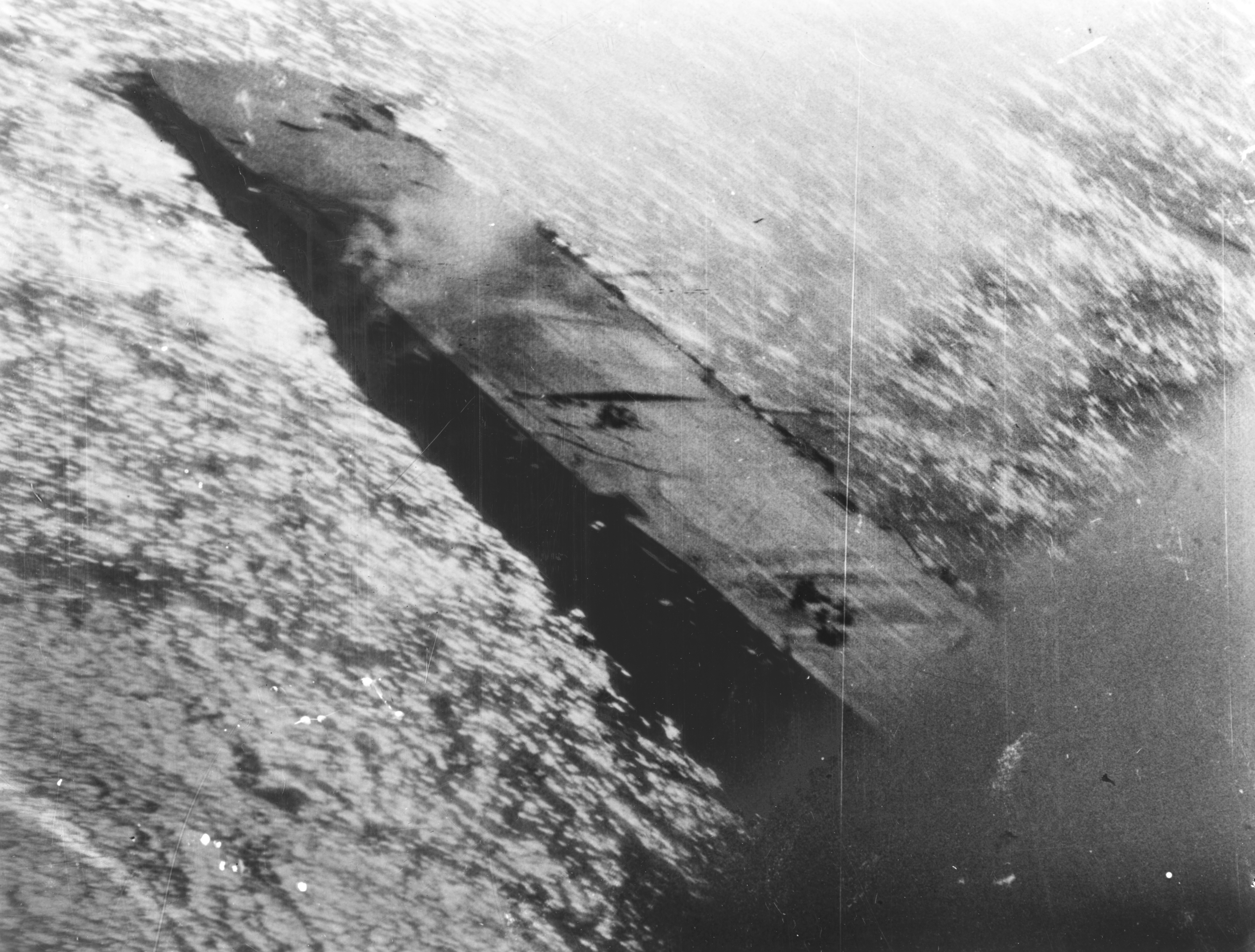
Zuihō sinking

American aircraft were able to track the Japanese ships for most of the night and Halsey ordered an air strike of 60 Hellcat fighters, 65 Helldiver dive bombers and 55 Avenger torpedo bombers launched shortly after dawn in anticipation of locating the Japanese fleet. They spotted it at 0735 and brushed aside the 13 Zeros that the Japanese had retained for self-defense. Zuihō attempted to launch her few remaining aircraft, but was hit by a single bomb on her aft flight deck after a number of torpedo-carrying Avengers missed. The 500-pound (230 kg) bomb started several small fires, lifted the rear elevator, bulged the flight deck, knocked out steering and gave the ship a small list to port. Twenty minutes later, the fires were put out, steering repaired and the list corrected. A second attack an hour later focused on Chiyoda and ignored Zuihō. The third wave arrived around 1300 and badly damaged the ship. She was hit once by a torpedo and twice by small bombs, although fragments from as many as 67 near misses cut steam pipes and caused flooding of both engine rooms and one boiler room. Zuihō was forced to reduce speed to 12 knots (22 km/h; 14 mph) and flooding increased so that all available hands were ordered to man the pumps at 1410. The ship took on a 13° list to starboard and went dead in the water at 1445 when the port engine room fully flooded. A fourth wave of American aircraft attacked ten minutes later, but only damaged her with splinters from another ten near misses. This was enough to increase her list to 23° and she was ordered abandoned at 1510. Zuihō sank at 1526 at position 19°20′N 125°15′E with the loss of 7 officers and 208 men. The destroyer Kuwa and the battleship Ise rescued 58 officers and 701 men between them.
