= Japan Computer Access Network =

Japan Computer Access Network (JCA-NET) is a Tokyo-based group aligned with the progressivism political philosophy that aims at empowering citizen's activities through the Internet.

== History ==
JCA-NET was founded in April 1997 as a member of the Association for Progressive Communications. An earlier group called Japan Computer Access was founded in 1993 in response to the 1990–1991 Gulf War. JCA-NET provides networking tools for non-governmental organizations (NGOs) and social movements, working closely with the Asialink, which is an Asia-wide NGO information and e-mail networks.

== Purpose ==
The group calls itself an "Internet service provider for development by people". This internet service was created for people wishing to publicise their activities, and know of other people's movements and activities across the globe. JCA-NET's main objective is to play the role of a "non-profit Internet provider that internationally links the information released by people and NGOs." It works to take technologies like electronic conference rooms, mailing lists and home pages to the alternate, development and campaign sectors. JCA-NET reported about a thousand subscribers on its mailing list in 2006.

Japan Computer Access For Empowerment (JCAFE) was also founded in 1993. JCAFE provides Internet technology and skills to support NGOs. Hamada 'Taratta' Tadahisa was chairman of JCAFE in 2006 when it joined the Association for Progressive Communications. At the time he reported 100 members, and support for 400 NGOs in Japan.
