= Mary King (economist) =

Trinidad and Tobago economist

Mary King is a Trinidad and Tobago economist, former Senator and former Minister of Planning, Economic and Social Restructuring and Gender Affairs in the People's Partnership Government. She is also an executive member of GOPAC, the Global Organisation of Parliamentarians Against Corruption, a former head of the Trinidad and Tobago chapter of Transparency International and is chairman of Mary King & Associates Ltd., a marketing research and business consulting company.

Mary King's appointment as Government Senator and Minister of Planning, Restructuring and Gender Affairs, was revoked by president Maxwell Richards on May 10, 2011, after a meeting with Prime Minister Kamla Persad-Bissessar. King was implicated in the inappropriate awarding of a $100,000 contract to a company, Ixanos, in which Mary King, and her husband, Dr St Clair King, have an interest. This is ironic, as King is involved in Transparency International. Mary King, the chairman of Mary King & Associates Ltd, established a market research firm six years ago to help businesses thrive in Trinidad and Tobago's changing culture and economy.
