= Jimi's Book of Japanese: A Motivating Method to Learn Japanese =

Jimi's Book of Japanese: A Motivating Method to Learn Japanese is a multi-book series published by David Voggenthaler, written by Peter X. Takahashi with illustrations by Yumie Toka. Two of three planned books have been published to date. The collective series teaches basic Japanese through a patents-pending "Triple Bubble" method that incorporates reading, writing and pronunciation guidance in a series of interconnected bubbles. The first book, "Jimi's Book of Japanese: A Motivating Method to Learn Japanese (Hiragana)" (ISBN 0972324704; ISBN 978-0972324700) teaches readers 46 basic Japanese Hiragana syllabary with more than 250 essential Japanese vocabulary. The second book, "Jimi's Book of Japanese: A Motivating Method to Learn Japanese (Katakana) teaches readers 46 Katakana syllabary plus essential Japanese vocabulary (ISBN 0972324720, ISBN 978-0972324724). Both books contain interactive exercises to improve basic Japanese comprehension.

The books are aimed at a broader audience in North America and at a grade school audience in the rest of the world. In 2003, Takahashi & Black/PBJ Omnimedia (imprint) won a Parents' Choice Award for category "Doing and Learning." and an IPPY (Independent Publisher Book Award) in the category for Academic books.
