= List of Japanese veterans in overseas interventions (1894–1927) =

Japanese Interventions between 1894 and 1927

This is a list of Japanese veterans (Navy or Army) who took part in overseas interventions from 1894 to 1927.

== Chinese-Japanese War (1894–95) ==
- Kantarō Suzuki: commanded a torpedo boat during Sino-Japanese War; participated in night torpedo assault on Wei-hai-wei (Lt)
- Aritomo Yamagata: Commanding General, First Army, Sino-Japanese War

== Russo-Japanese War (1904–05) ==
- Sadao Araki: Company Commander, 1st Infantry Regiment, Imperial Guard Division during Russo-Japanese War
- Prince Kuni Kuniyoshi: during the Russo-Japanese War, he served as a major in the infantry assigned to the staff of General Kuroki Tamemoto, commander of the First Army
- Jirō Minami: Company Commander, 1st Cavalry Regiment, Russo-Japanese War (took part in assault on Port Arthur)
- Toshizō Nishio: participated in Russo-Japanese War, infantry battalion adjutant, 40th Infantry Regiment
- Kantarō Suzuki: commanded 4th Destroyer Division, which picked up survivors of the Port Arthur Blockade Squadron, during Russo-Japanese War (Commander)
- Jun Ushiroku: 53d Infantry Regiment (Russo-Japanese War)
- Otozō Yamada: participated in Russo-Japanese War; captured by the Soviet Army at the end of World War II and accused of involvement with human experimentation performed by the Japanese Army in Manchuria

== Japanese Intervention in Siberia (1918–1927) ==
- Korechika Anami: Staff Officer, Sakhalin Expeditionary Army
- Sadao Araki: Staff Officer, Expeditionary Army Headquarters, Vladivostok
- Kitsuju Ayabe: Siberian Expeditionary Army (Cavalry)
- Shōjirō Iida: participated in Siberian Expedition
- Koreshige Inuzuka: naval officer
- Shigenori Kuroda: Amur Railway Detachment Headquarters
- Masutaro Nakai: Siberian Expedition, 1919–20
- General Ohi: Japanese commander in Amur-Vladivostok area in the period of the Russian Far East administration
- Jun Ushiroku: Staff Officer, 5th Division (Vladivostok)
- Norihiro Yasue: Siberian Expeditionary Army
