= Japanese Improvised armored train =

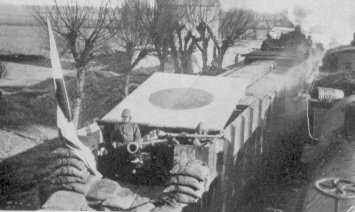
Improvised armored train of the IJA in Manchuria

The Japanese Improvised armored train was a series of armored trains converted from normal passenger trains during the 1920s. They were used to guard the Japanese controlled railways in Manchuria.
