= Jōetsu =

Jōetsu (上越) may refer to:

- as Kami-Echigo (上越後):
  - Jōetsu region, a geographical region in Niigata Prefecture
  - Jōetsu, Niigata, a city in Niigata Prefecture, Japan
- as Kōzuke (上野) and Echigo (越後):
  - Jōetsu Line, a major rail line in Japan
  - Jōetsu Shinkansen, a high-speed shinkansen railway line connecting Tokyo and Niigata
