= Japan on Foot =

"Japan on Foot" is the name of a walking project that was undertaken by Etsuko Shimabukuro of Okinawa and Mary King, a British citizen.

The two women spent 16 months walking a zigzag route through Japan. The 7,494-kilometre walk started from Cape Sōya, Japan's northernmost point on the island of Hokkaidō and ended on Yonaguni Island, Japan's westernmost point. The women's walk took in Honshū, Shikoku, Kyūshū, Okinawa (including Japan's southernmost inhabited island). It was a "roving reporter" walk. Shimabukuro and King wrote various newspaper, magazine, and website articles from the road. A book of the walk was published in 2011 by Fine Line Press.
