= Japanese aircraft carrier Zuihō =

Japanese lead ship of Zuiho-class

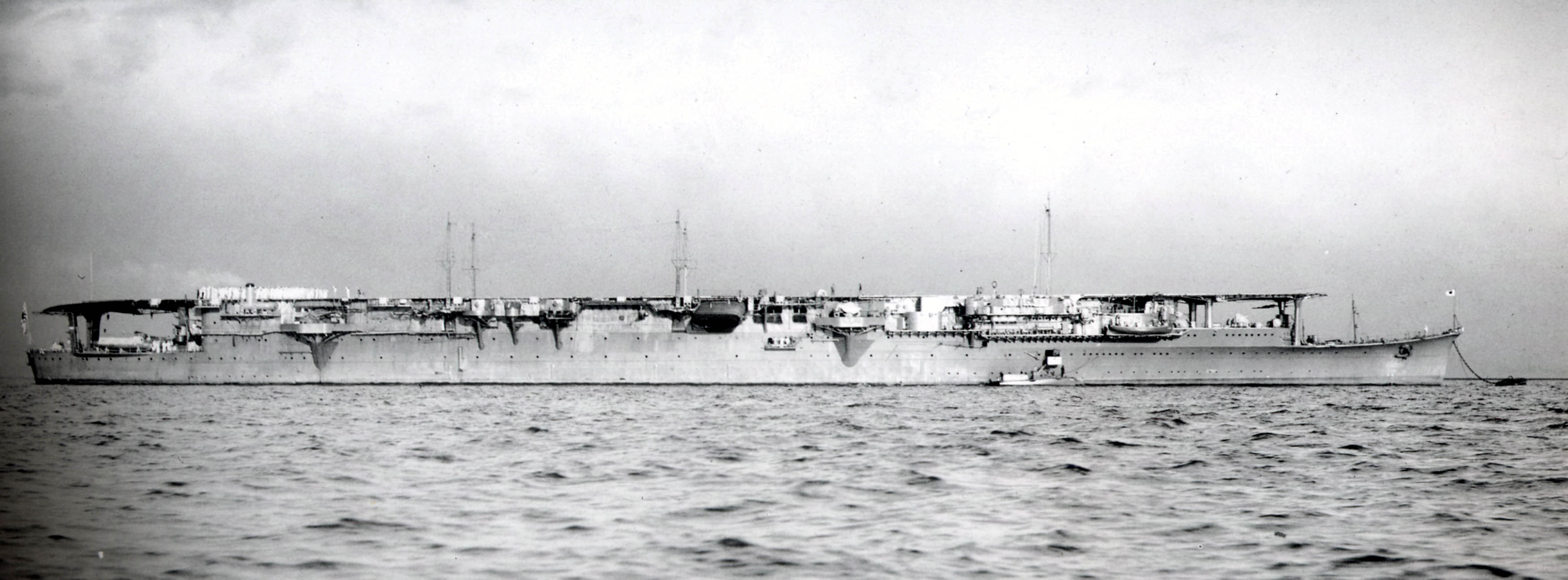
- Zuihō at anchor, 28 December 1940

History

Empire of Japan
- Name: Zuihō
- Namesake: Auspicious or Fortunate Phoenix
- Builder: Yokosuka Naval Arsenal
- Laid down: 20 June 1935
- Launched: 19 June 1936
- Commissioned: 27 December 1940
- Renamed: from Takasaki, 15 December 1940
- Fate: Sunk by air attack during the Battle off Cape Engaño, 25 October 1944

General characteristics (as converted)
- Class & type: Zuihō-class aircraft carrier
- Displacement: 11,443 t (11,262 long tons) (standard)
- Length: 205.5 m (674 ft 2 in) (o/a)
- Beam: 18.2 m (59 ft 8 in)
- Draft: 6.6 m (21 ft 7 in)
- Installed power: 4 water-tube boilers; 52,000 shp (39,000 kW)
- Propulsion: 2 shafts; 2 geared steam turbines
- Speed: 28 knots (52 km/h; 32 mph)
- Range: 7,800 nmi (14,400 km; 9,000 mi) at 18 knots (33 km/h; 21 mph)
- Complement: 785
- Armament: 4 × twin 12.7 cm (5 in) DP guns; 4 × twin 25 mm (1 in) AA guns
- Aircraft carried: 30

Zuihō (瑞鳳; "Auspicious Phoenix" or "Fortunate Phoenix") was the name ship of her class of two light aircraft carriers built for the Imperial Japanese Navy. Originally laid down as the submarine tender Takasaki (Japanese: 高崎, "Tall Cape"), she was renamed and converted while under construction into an aircraft carrier. The ship was completed during the first year of World War II and played a minor role in the Battle of Midway in mid-1942. She participated in the Guadalcanal Campaign during the rest of 1942. Significantly damaged during the Battle of the Santa Cruz Islands in that campaign, after repairs Zuihō covered the evacuation of Japanese forces from Guadalcanal in early 1943.

Her aircraft were disembarked several times in mid- to late-1943 and used from land bases in a series of battles in the Southwest Pacific. Zuihō participated in the Battles of the Philippine Sea and Leyte Gulf in mid-1944. In this last engagement, she mainly served as a decoy for the main striking forces and was sunk by American aircraft. In between battles, the ship served as an aircraft ferry and a training ship.

== Design and conversion ==
The submarine support ship Takasaki was laid down on 20 June 1935 at the Yokosuka Naval Arsenal and was designed to be converted to either a fleet oiler or a light aircraft carrier as needed. She was launched on 19 June 1936 and began a lengthy conversion into a carrier while fitting-out. The ship was renamed Zuihō during the process which was not completed until 27 December 1940 when she was commissioned.

After her conversion, Zuihō had a length of 205.5 meters (674 ft 2 in) overall. She had a beam of 18.2 meters (59 ft 8 in) and a draft of 6.6 meters (21 ft 7 in). She displaced 11,443 metric tons (11,262 long tons) at standard load. Her original diesel engines were intended to give her a top speed of 29 knots (54 km/h; 33 mph), but they were replaced by a pair of geared steam turbine sets as part of her conversion. Each turbine set drove one propeller using steam provided by four water-tube boilers. The turbines produced a total of 52,000 shaft horsepower (39,000 kW) which gave Zuihō a maximum speed of 28 knots (52 km/h; 32 mph). She carried enough fuel oil to give her a range of 7,800 nautical miles (14,400 km; 9,000 mi) at a speed of 18 knots (33 km/h; 21 mph). Her crew numbered 785 officers and men.

Zuihō was a flush-deck design and lacked an island superstructure. Her flight deck was 180 meters (590 ft 6 in) long and had a maximum width of 23 meters (75 ft 6 in). The ship was built with a single hangar 120 meters (406 ft 10 in) long and 18 meters (59 ft) wide, intended to house 30 aircraft. The hangar was served by two octagonal centerline aircraft elevators. She had arresting gear with six cables, but was not fitted with an aircraft catapult.

The ship's primary armament consisted of eight 12.7-centimeter (5 in) Type 89 dual-purpose guns in twin mounts on sponsons along the sides of the hull. Zuihō was also initially equipped with four twin 25-millimeter (1 in) Type 96 light anti-aircraft (AA) guns, also in sponsons along the sides of the hull. In 1943, her light AA armament was increased to forty-eight 25 mm guns. The following year, an additional twenty 25 mm guns were added in addition to six 28-round AA rocket launchers.

== Service ==
After commissioning, Zuihō remained in Japanese waters until late 1941. Captain Sueo Ōbayashi assumed command on 20 September and Zuihō became flagship of the Third Carrier Division ten days later. She was briefly assigned to the 11th Air Fleet in Formosa on 13 October and arrived in Takao the following day. The ship returned to Japan in early November, rejoining the Third Carrier Division, and was given a brief refit later in the month. Together with the carrier Hōshō and six battleships, Zuihō covered the return of the ships of the 1st Air Fleet (Kido Butai) as they returned from the attack on Pearl Harbor in mid-December.

In February 1942, the ship ferried Mitsubishi A6M "Zero" fighters to Davao City, Philippines for the 11th Air Fleet. Transferred to the First Fleet after the Third Carrier Division was disbanded on 1 April, Zuihō remained in Japanese waters until June when she participated in the Battle of Midway. She was assigned to the Main Body of the invasion force and her aircraft complement consisted of six Mitsubishi A5M "Claude" and six A6M2 "Zero" fighters, and twelve Nakajima B5N2 "Kate" torpedo bombers. After the initial American airstrikes that sank three Japanese carriers, the Main Body was ordered to rendezvous with the Kido Butai at high speed, but this order was cancelled later that evening. Late on 5 June, the fighters of her combat air patrol drove off an American Consolidated PBY Catalina reconnaissance aircraft of VP-44 that had spotted the Main Body. Zuihō was ordered the following afternoon to prepare to launch an airstrike, together with aircraft from the seaplane tender Nisshin, on the carriers that the Japanese imagined were pursuing them, but this was cancelled on the morning of 7 June when it became clear that there was no pursuit. After a brief refit in July–August in Sasebo, the ship was assigned to the First Carrier Division with the carriers Shōkaku and Zuikaku on 12 August.

The division sailed to Truk on 1 October to support Japanese forces in the Guadalcanal Campaign and departed from Truk 10 days later based on the promise of the Imperial Japanese Army to capture Henderson Field on Guadalcanal. At this time, Zuihō carried eighteen A6Ms and six B5Ns. The Japanese and American carrier forces discovered each other in the early morning of 26 October at the opening of the Battle of the Santa Cruz Islands and each side launched airstrikes. The aircraft passed each other en route and nine of Zuihō's Zeros attacked the aircraft launched by the aircraft carrier Enterprise. They shot down three Grumman F4F Wildcat fighters and three Grumman TBF Avenger torpedo bombers and damaged one more of each type while losing four of their own. Two of Enterprise's Douglas SBD Dauntless dive bombers operating as armed scouts hit Zuihō with 500-pound (230 kg) bombs while the fleet was launching the first and second wave against the American carriers. This put her flight deck out of action, although she was not seriously damaged otherwise. Together with the damaged Shōkaku, the ship withdrew from the battle and reached Truk two days later. After temporary repairs, the two carriers returned to Japan in early November and Zuihō's repairs were completed on 16 December. In the meantime, Captain Bunjiro Yamaguchi assumed command.

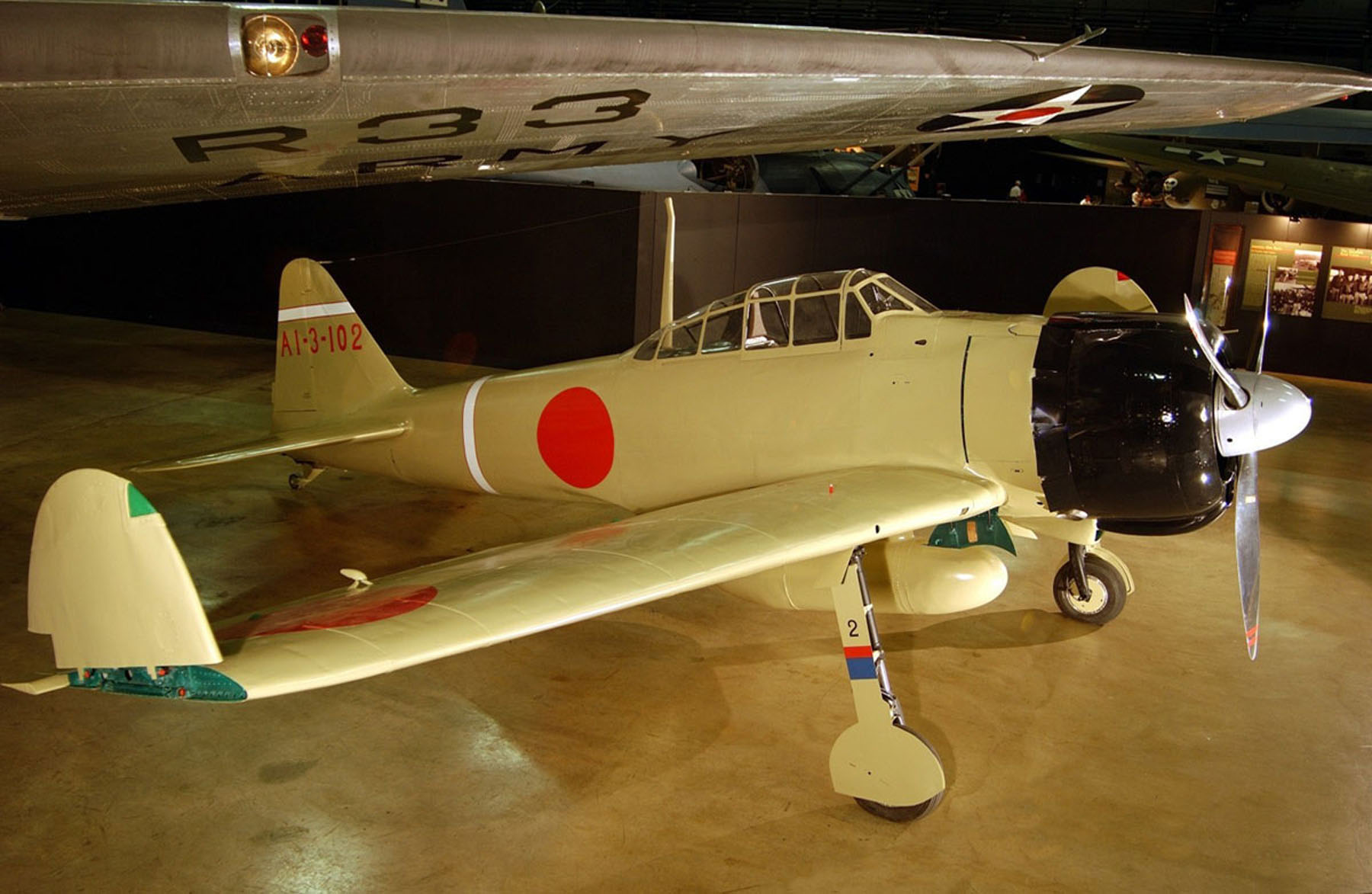
A Mitsubishi A6M Zero, painted to represent a section leader's aircraft from Zuihō during the Battle of the Bismarck Sea

The ship left Kure on 17 January 1943 and sailed for Truk with a load of aircraft. Upon arrival she was assigned to the Second Carrier Division with the carriers Jun'yō and Zuikaku to provide cover for the evacuation of Guadalcanal. Zuihō's fighters were transferred to Wewak, New Guinea, in mid-February and then to Kavieng in early March, although the ship remained at Truk. They flew to Rabaul on mid-March to participate in Operation I-Go, a land-based aerial offensive against Allied bases in the Solomon Islands and New Guinea. The fighters returned to Truk on 18 March after claiming 18 Allied aircraft shot down. Zuihō arrived at Sasebo on 9 May and received a brief refit in mid-June. She returned to Truk on 15 July and remained in the area until 5 November when she returned to Yokosuka. Her air group, 18 Zeros and 8 D3As, was briefly deployed to Kavieng in late August – early September before returning to Truk. By this time, Zuihō was assigned to the First Carrier Division with Shōkaku and Zuikaku and they sailed for Eniwetok Atoll on 18 September for training; a secondary objective was to be in position to intercept any attacks by American carriers in the vicinity of Wake Island and the Marshall Islands area. That day the American carriers raided the Gilbert Islands and were gone by the time the Japanese reached Eniwetok on 20 September. Japanese intelligence reports pointed to another American attack in the Wake-Marshall Islands area in mid-October and Admiral Mineichi Koga sortied the Combined Fleet, including the First Carrier Division, on 17 October. They arrived at Eniwetok two days later and waited for reports of American activity until 23 October. They then sailed for Wake Island and then returned to Truk on 26 October without encountering any American ships.

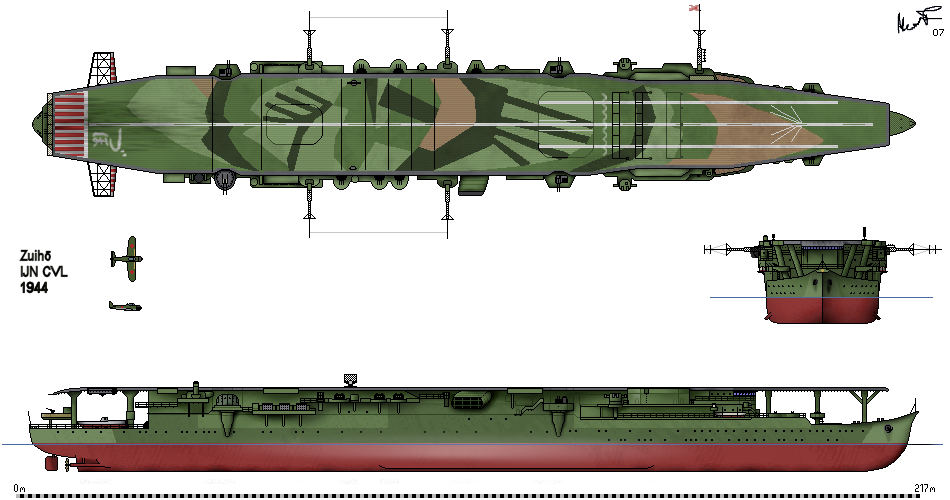
Plan and right elevation drawing of Zuihō in 1944

Zuihō's air group was transferred to Rabaul at the beginning of November, just in time to participate in the raid on Rabaul a few days later. The fighters claimed to have shot down 25 American aircraft at the cost of eight pilots; the survivors flew back to Truk and remained ashore. On 30 November, Zuihō, together with the escort carriers Chūyō and Unyō, departed Truk for Japan, escorted by four destroyers. The Americans had cracked the Japanese naval codes and positioned several submarines along their route to Yokosuka. Skate unsuccessfully attacked Zuihō on 30 November, while Sailfish torpedoed and sank Chūyō five days later with heavy loss of life. From December to May 1944, Zuihō ferried aircraft and supplies to Truk and Guam although she was reassigned to the Third Carrier Division on 29 January, together with the converted carriers Chitose and Chiyoda. Each of the three carriers was intended to be equipped with 21 fighters and 9 torpedo bombers, but this plan was changed on 15 February to a consolidated air group, the 653rd, that controlled the aircraft of all three carriers. While fully equipped with 18 Zero fighters, 45 Zero fighter-bombers, 18 B5Ns, and 9 Nakajima B6N "Jill" torpedo bombers by May, the air group's pilots were largely drawn from the two most recent classes of flight school graduates and lacked experience. The ship sailed for Tawi-Tawi on 11 May in the Philippines. The new base was closer to the oil wells in Borneo on which the Navy relied and also to the Palau and western Caroline Islands where the Japanese expected the next American attack. However, the location lacked an airfield on which to train the green pilots and American submarines were very active in the vicinity which restricted the ships to the anchorage.

=== Battle of the Philippine Sea ===
The 1st Mobile Fleet was en route to Guimares Island in the central Philippines on 13 June, where they intended to practice carrier operations in an area better protected from submarines, when Vice Admiral Jisaburō Ozawa learned of the American attack on the Mariana Islands the previous day. Upon reaching Guimares, the fleet refueled and sortied into the Philippine Sea where they spotted Task Force 58 on 18 June. The Americans failed to locate Ozawa's ships that day and the Japanese turned south to maintain a constant distance between them and the American carriers as Ozawa had decided on launching his airstrikes early the following morning. He had deployed his forces in a "T"- shaped formation with the Third Carrier Division at the end of the stem, 115 nautical miles (213 km; 132 mi) ahead of the First and Second Carrier Divisions that formed the crossbar of the "T". Zuihō and her consorts were intended to draw the attention of the Americans while the other carriers conducted their airstrikes without disruption.

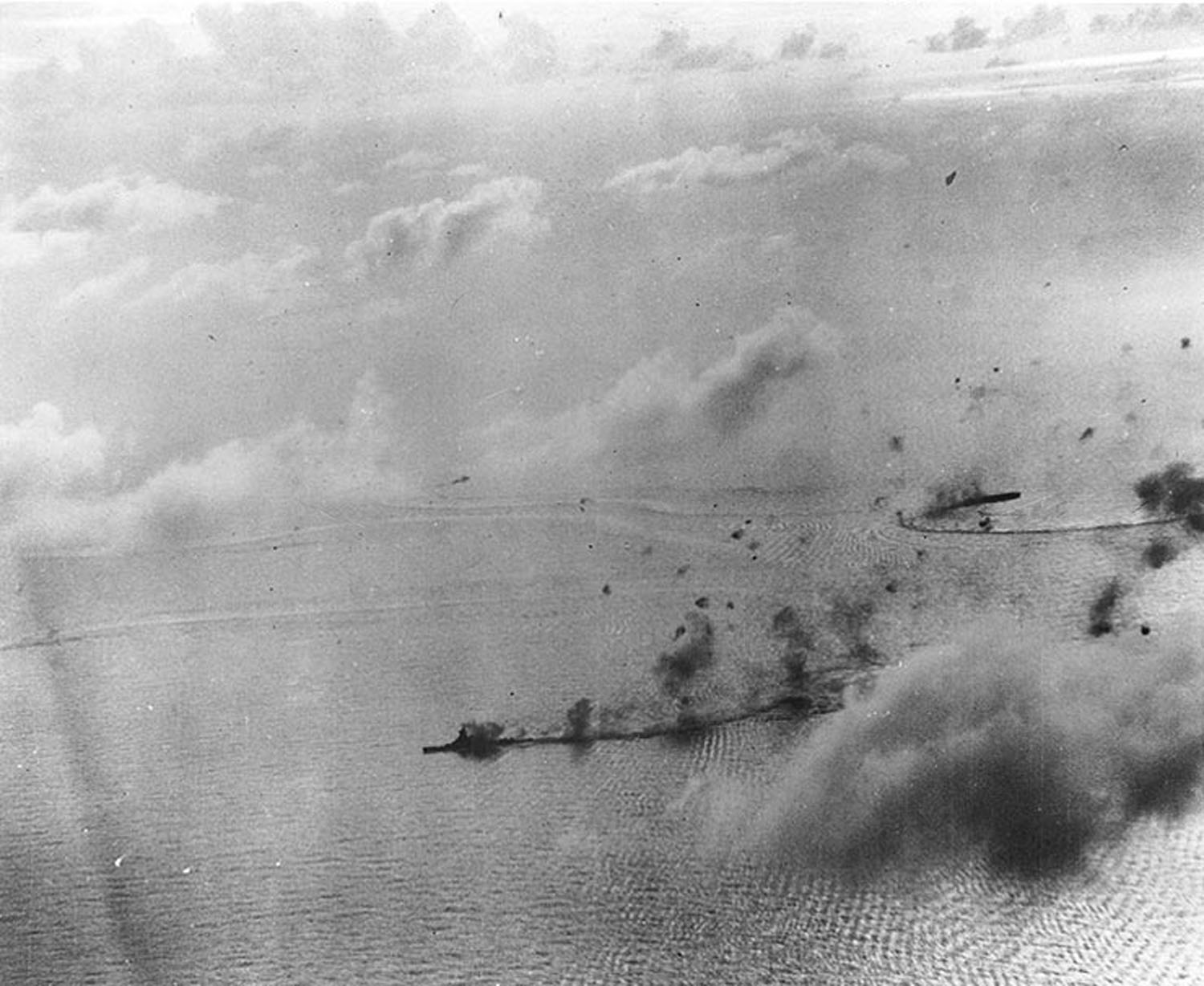
The Third Carrier Division under attack. A Kongō-class battleship is at center and Chiyoda is at right.

Sixteen Aichi E13A floatplanes were launched by the heavy cruisers accompanying the carriers at 04:30 to search for the Americans; the three carriers launched a follow-up wave of 13 B5Ns at 05:20. The first wave spotted one group of four carriers from Task Force 58 at 07:34 and the Japanese carriers launched their aircraft an hour later. This consisted of 43 Zero fighter-bombers and 7 B6Ns, escorted by 14 A6M5 fighters; the carriers retained only 3 fighters, 2 fighter-bombers, 2 B6Ns and 2 B5Ns for self-defense and later searches. While the airstrike was still forming up, the second wave of searchers located Task Force 58's battleships and the airstrike was diverted to attack them. The Americans detected the incoming Japanese aircraft at 09:59 and had a total of 199 Grumman F6F Hellcat fighters in the air by the time the Japanese aircraft were in range of the American ships. The defending fighters decimated the Japanese aircraft and only 21 survived. The only damage inflicted was from one A6M2 that hit the battleship South Dakota in her superstructure with a single 250-kilogram (550 lb) bomb that wounded 50 crewmen, but did little other damage. Only 3 Hellcats were lost in the affair, 1 to a B6N, although the Japanese claimed four victories. Some of the surviving Japanese aircraft landed at Guam while others, including the 5 surviving B6Ns, returned to their carriers where they claimed one carrier definitely damaged and another probably hit.

At dusk, the Japanese turned away to the northwest to regroup and to refuel, while the Americans turned west to close the distance. Both sides launched aircraft the next day to locate each other; Zuihō launched three aircraft at 12:00 to search east of the fleet, but they did not find the Americans. The Americans discovered the retiring Japanese fleet during the afternoon and Vice Admiral Marc Mitscher ordered an airstrike launched. While their attack sank the carrier Hiyō and damaged two others, Zuihō escaped unscathed and successfully disengaged that evening. By the end of the battle, Ozawa had only 34 intact aircraft. After reaching Japan on 1 July, the ship remained in Japanese waters until October, training replacements for her air group.

=== Battle of Leyte Gulf ===
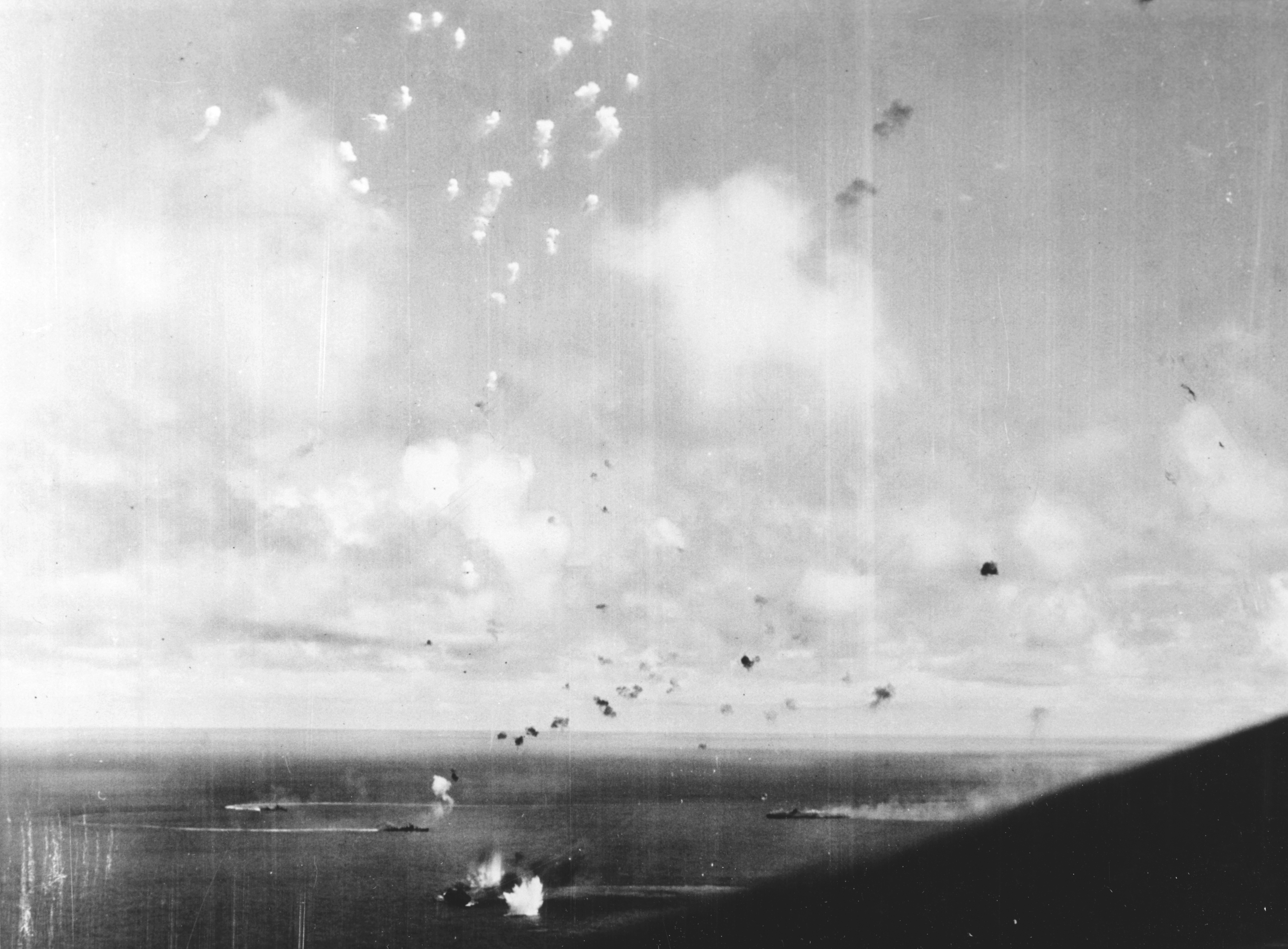
Zuihō under attack bottom center; Zuikaku is on fire at right center

After the Battle of the Philippine Sea, the commander of the Combined Fleet, Admiral Soemu Toyoda, prepared various contingency plans: Shō-Gō 1 (捷１号作戦 Shō ichigō sakusen) was a major naval operation in the Philippines, while Shō-Gō 2 was intended to defend Formosa, the Ryukyu Islands and southern Kyushu. He activated Shō-Gō 2 after the Americans attacked the Philippines, Formosa and the Ryukyu Islands beginning on 10 October. This required the transfer of most of the 653rd Naval Air Group to Formosa and Luzon to attack the American forces, with only a few aircraft retained for carrier operations. Most of the 653rd's aircraft were fruitlessly destroyed when the Americans suppressed Japanese defenses in the Philippines, preparatory to the actual invasion.

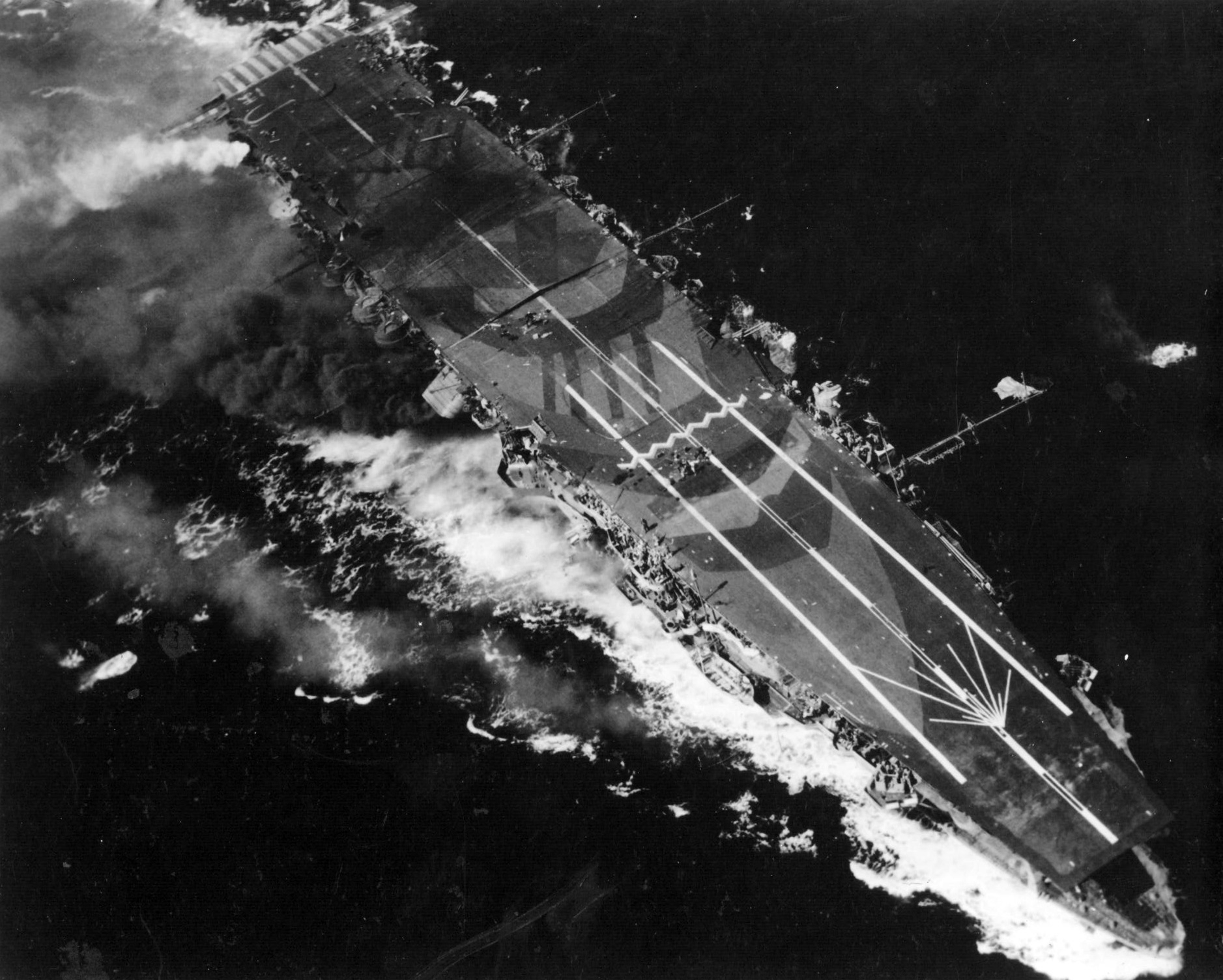
Zuihō showing damage on her flight deck aft

On 17 October Toyoda alerted the fleet that Shō-Gō 1 was imminent and activated the plan the following day after receiving reports of the landings on Leyte. Under the plan, Zuihō and the rest of Ozawa's carrier force were to approach Leyte Gulf from the north as a diversion from two other forces approaching from the south and west, with all three forces converging on the gulf on 25 October; the Main Body left Japan on 20 October. As decoys, the carriers were only provided with a total of 116 aircraft: 52 A6M5 fighters, 28 A6M2 fighter-bombers, 7 Yokosuka D4Y "Judy" dive bombers, 26 B6Ns and 4 B5Ns. By the morning of 24 October, the Main Body was within range of the northernmost American carriers of Task Force 38 and Ozawa ordered an airstrike launched to attract the attention of the Americans. This accomplished little else as the Japanese aircraft failed to penetrate past the defending fighters; the survivors landed at airfields on Luzon. Preoccupied with the other Japanese naval forces and land-based air attacks, the Americans could not spare any aircraft to search for the Japanese carriers until the afternoon. They were spotted at 16:05, but Admiral William Halsey, Jr., commander of Task Force 38, decided that it was too late in the day to mount an effective strike. He did, however, turn all of his ships north to position himself for a dawn attack on the Japanese carriers the next day in what came to be called the Battle off Cape Engaño.

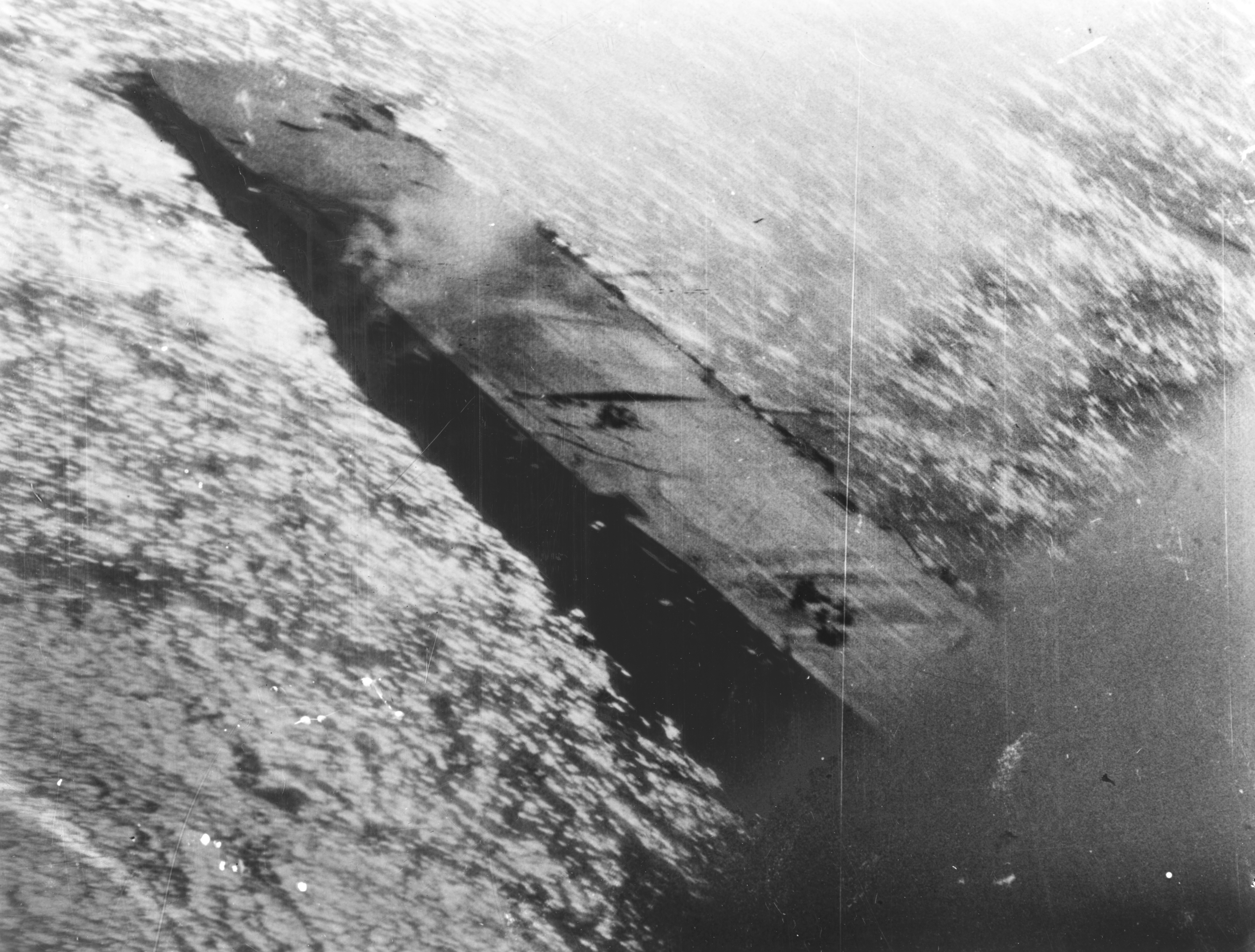
Zuihō sinking during the afternoon

Aircraft from the light carrier Independence were able to track the Japanese ships for most of the night and Halsey ordered an airstrike of 60 Hellcats, 65 Curtiss SB2C Helldiver dive bombers and 55 Avengers launched shortly after dawn in anticipation of locating the Japanese fleet. They spotted them at 07:35 and brushed aside the 13 Zeros that the Japanese had retained for self-defense. Zuihō attempted to launch her few remaining aircraft, but was hit by a single bomb on her aft flight deck after a number of torpedo-carrying Avengers missed. The 500-pound (230 kg) bomb started several small fires, lifted the rear elevator, bulged the flight deck, knocked out steering and gave the ship a small list to port. Twenty minutes later, the fires were put out, steering repaired and the list corrected. A second attack an hour later focused on Chiyoda and ignored Zuihō. The third wave arrived around 13:00 and badly damaged the ship. She was hit once by a torpedo and twice by small bombs, although fragments from as many as 67 near misses cut steam pipes and caused flooding of both engine rooms and one boiler room. Zuihō was forced to reduce speed to 12 knots (22 km/h; 14 mph) and flooding increased so that all available hands were ordered to man the pumps at 14:10. The ship took on a 13° list to starboard and went dead in the water at 14:45 when the port engine room fully flooded. The fourth wave of American aircraft attacked ten minutes later, but only damaged her with splinters from another ten near misses. This was enough to increase her list to 23° and she was ordered abandoned at 15:10. Zuihō sank at 15:26 at position 19°20′N 125°15′E with the loss of 7 officers and 208 men. The destroyer Kuwa and the battleship Ise rescued 58 officers and 701 men between them.

== Bibliography ==
- Brown, David (1977). WWII Fact Files: Aircraft Carriers. New York: Arco Publishing. ISBN 0-668-04164-1.
- Brown, J. D. (2009). Carrier Operations in World War II. Annapolis, Maryland: Naval Institute Press. ISBN 978-1-59114-108-2.
- Hata, Ikuhiko; Yasuho, Izawa & Shores, Christopher (2011). Japanese Naval Air Force Fighter Units and Their Aces 1932–1945. London: Grub Street. ISBN 978-1-906502-84-3.
- Jentschura, Hansgeorg; Jung, Dieter & Mickel, Peter (1977). Warships of the Imperial Japanese Navy, 1869–1945. Annapolis, Maryland: United States Naval Institute. ISBN 0-87021-893-X.
- Lengerer, Hans (2023). The Aircraft Carriers of the Imperial Japanese Navy and Army: Technical and Operational History. Vol. II. Katowice, Poland: Model Hobby. ISBN 978-83-60041-71-0.
- Parshall, Jonathan & Tully, Anthony (2005). Shattered Sword: The Untold Story of the Battle of Midway. Dulles, Virginia: Potomac Books. ISBN 1-57488-923-0.
- Peattie, Mark (2001). Sunburst: The Rise of Japanese Naval Air Power 1909–1941. Annapolis, Maryland: Naval Institute Press. ISBN 1-55750-432-6.
- Polmar, Norman & Genda, Minoru (2006). Aircraft Carriers: A History of Carrier Aviation and Its Influence on World Events. Vol. 1, 1909–1945. Washington, D.C.: Potomac Books. ISBN 1-57488-663-0.
- Tully, Anthony P. (2007). "IJN Zuiho: Tabular Record of Movement". Kido Butai. Combinedfleet.com.
