= 6th Air Group =

Unit of the Imperial Japanese Navy Air Service (IJNAS) during the Pacific War

- Active: 1 April 1942 – 1 November 1942
- Country: Empire of Japan
- Branch: (Empire of Japan) Imperial Japanese Navy
- Type: Naval aviation unit
- Role: Fighter
- Part of: 26th Air Flotilla, 11th Air Fleet
- Garrison/HQ: Kisarazu; Midway Island (intended); Rabaul; Buin
- Aircraft flown: Mitsubishi A6M Zero
- Engagements: World War II: Doolittle Raid; Battle of Midway; Guadalcanal Campaign; Solomon Islands Campaign; Naval Battle of Guadalcanal (Note: As 204th Air Group.); Operation KE; Battle of Bismarck Sea; Operation SO and SE; Defence of Rabaul

Commanders
- Notable commanders: Hideki Shingō; Tadashi Kaneko; Mitsugi Kofukuda; Zenjirō Miyano; Saburō Shindō; Kiyokuma Okajima

The 6th Air Group (第六航空隊, Dai-roku Kōkūtai) was a unit of the Imperial Japanese Navy Air Service (IJNAS) during the Pacific War that was involved in Battle of Midway and then extensively in the Guadalcanal Campaign and Solomon Islands Campaign. The air group was redesignated as the 204th Air Group on 1 November 1942.

== History ==
The unit was formed on 1 April 1942 in Kisarazu, Japan, and was initially equipped with only six Mitsubishi A6M Zero fighters, under the command of Lieutenant Hideki Shingō. The group made an unsuccessful interception attempt during the Doolittle Raid on 18 April. By 30 May, the group's fighter strength increased to 33 Zeros and Lieutenant Tadashi Kaneko was appointed as its commander (Hikōtaichō). It was intended to serve as a garrison for Midway Island after it would be captured in the upcoming Operation MI in June. Six fighters were embarked on the carrier Akagi, nine Kaga, three each on Hiryū and Sōryū, while 12 were on Jun'yō. Some of the fighters were involved in the Battle of Midway under Lieutenant Kaneko, and in Attack on Dutch Harbor under Lieutenant Zenjirō Miyano.

The disaster at Midway meant that the intended plan for the 6th Air Group was now infeasible. At the end of August 1942, the group was sent to Rabaul on New Britain to be used in operations in New Guinea and the Solomon Islands. Its new Hikōtaichō, Lieutenant Mitsugi Kofukuda, led a 5,000-kilometer over-water ferry flight of 18 Zero fighters from Kisarazu to Rabaul via island bases (Iwo Jima, Saipan, Truk and Kavieng), which was unprecedented for a single-seat aircraft at the time. (Note: Lundstorm (2005b) states that only 13 Zeros eventually made it to Rabaul. However, both Kofukuda (2004) and Hata, et al. (2011) state that all arrived safely.)

Initially, the 6th Air Group was assigned to provide air defence for the Rabaul base and air cover for ship convoys in the area. Their first operation against Guadalcanal came on 11 September 1942 and from then on they regularly flew missions from Rabaul to Guadalcanal. In one such mission on 28 September, Lieutenant Kofukuda led 27 Zeros to escort 27 Mitsubishi G4M bombers. The US forces from Henderson Field scrambled 35 Grumman F4F Wildcat fighters to intercept the strike, after receiving an early warning from coastwatchers and radar. During the ensuing air battle, 6th Air Group Zeros were unsuccessful at protecting the Japanese bombers and eight of them were lost. As a consequence, the Japanese changed the tactics and Lieutenant Kofukuda led a fighter sweep of 28 Zeros (18 from 6th Air Group and ten from Tainan Air Group) ahead of nine G4M bombers and eight Zeros. The latter acted as a decoy and turned back before reaching Guadalcanal, while Kofukuda' Zeros continued on. After arriving above Guadalcanal, they managed to surprise the intercepting 36 Wildcats and shot down six of them for the loss of one Zero. In addition, when they withdrew, they found and destroyed two Douglas SBD Dauntless dive bombers above Savo Island.

On 8 October 1942, the 6th Air Group under Lieutenant Kofukuda moved from Rabaul to a newly completed airstrip at Buin on Bougainville. The day before, Lieutenant Miyano (6th Air Group Buntaichō) ferried 30 Model 32 Zeros from the carrier Zuihō. From Buin, the group was able to operate the new Model 32 Zero fighters, which previously did not have the combat range to reach Guadalcanal from Rabaul. There they provided air cover for high-speed resupply convoys bound for Guadalcanal. While doing so, they lost five Zeros to bad weather on 11 October and six Zeros to ditching on 14 October when they were sent on an evening patrol. On 16 October, nine 6th Air Group Zeros under Lieutenant (jg) Katsutoshi Kawamata escorted a strike of nine Aichi D3A dive bombers from 31st Air Group against Allied ships off Guadalcanal. On 22 October, nine 6th Air Group Zeros under Lieutenant Kufukuda escorted a strike of 12 Aichi D3A dive bombers from 31st and 2nd Air Group in a similar anti-shipping mission. The next day they provided a standard fighter sweep of 12 Zeros under Kufukuda went ahead of G4M bombers and attacked Henderson Field.

On 1 November 1942, 6th Air group was redesignated as the 204th Air Group. Under the new name, the air group continued to participate in Guadalcanal Campaign. In another classic engagement over Guadalcanal, a combination of 18 Zeros from Hiyō Air Group (operating from Buin) and 204th Air Group, under the command of Lieutenant Commander Kaneko (ex-6th Air Group Hikōtaichō, now with Hiyō) and Lieutenant Miyano, respectively, fought with 21 F4F Wildcats and shot down six of them for the loss of two zeros. The group then participated in the Naval Battle of Guadalcanal, where they protected the crippled battleship Hiei on 13 November. The next day, Lieutenant Miyano and Lieutenant Commander Kofukuda led two separate patrols that included six Zero fighters each in order to cover Rear Admiral Raizō Tanaka's transports carrying fresh troops and supplies to Guadalcanal. Afterwards it was involved in covering the evacuation of Japanese troops from Guadalcanal in February 1943, and the convoy to reinforce Lae on New Guinea in March 1943.

In March 1943, Lieutenant Commander Kofukuda was replaced by Lieutenant Miyano as the group's Hikōtaichō. Having noticed in previous missions that friendly dive bombers were often shot down after they released their bombs, Lieutenant Miyano proposed that his group should go to low altitude and provide fighter cover after the bomb release point. They tested this on 16 June during the Operation SE, when the group's 24 Zeros covered Lieutenant Tamotsu Ema's 24 Aichi D3A dive bombers that attacked the Allied ships off the coast of Guadalcanal. While this helped to better protect the dive bombers, Lieutenant Miyano was killed during the action.

Later, the air group saw extensive action during Operation RO and the defence of Rabaul from late 1943 to early 1944, before being disbanded on 4 March 1944. During that period, the famous aces Tetsuzō Iwamoto and Sadamu Komachi were its members.

== Sources ==
- Hata, Ikuhiko; Izawa, Yasuho; Shores, Christopher (2011). Japanese Naval Air Force Fighter Units and their aces, 1932-1945. London, UK: Grub Street. ISBN 9781906502843.
- Lundstrom, John B. (2005a). The First Team: Pacific Naval Air Combat from Pearl Harbor to Midway (New ed.). Annapolis, Maryland: Naval Institute Press. ISBN 1-59114-471-X.
- Lundstrom, John B. (2005b). First Team and the Guadalcanal Campaign: Naval Fighter Combat from August to November 1942 (New ed.). Annapolis, Maryland: Naval Institute Press. ISBN 1-59114-472-8.
- Parshall, Jonathan; Tully, Anthony (2005). Shattered Sword: The Untold Story of the Battle of Midway. Dulles, Virginia: Potomac Books. ISBN 1-57488-923-0.
- Stille, Mark (2019). Guadalcanal 1942–43: Japan's Bid to Knock Out Henderson Field and the Cactus Air Force. Air Campaign. Osprey Publishing. ISBN 1472835514.
- Millman, Nicholas (2019). A6M Zero-sen Aces 1940-42. Aircraft of the Aces #137. Osprey Publishing. ISBN 1472821440.
- 江間, 保 (1991). 急降下爆撃隊—日本海軍のヘルダイバー (in Japanese). 今日の話題社. ISBN 4875651384.
- 川崎, 浹 (2003). ある零戦パイロットの軌跡 (in Japanese). トランスビュー. ISBN 4901510177.
- 小福田, 晧文 (2004). 指揮官空戦記—ある零戦隊長のリポート (光人社NF文庫) (in Japanese). 光人社; 新装. ISBN 4769820445.

=== Combat reports ===
- 海軍大臣官房. 6空飛行機隊戦闘行動調書 (Report). Japan Center for Asian Historical Records.
- 海軍大臣官房. 204空飛行機隊戦闘行動調書 (Report). Japan Center for Asian Historical Records.
