= 2nd Air Group =

Unit of the Imperial Japanese Navy Air Service (IJNAS) during the Pacific War

- Active: 31 May 1942 – 1 November 1942
- Country: Empire of Japan
- Branch: (Empire of Japan) Imperial Japanese Navy
- Type: Naval aviation unit
- Role: Dive Bomber; Fighter; Torpedo Bomber (Note: Only as 582nd Air Group.)
- Part of: 8th Fleet; 25th Air Flotilla, 11th Air Fleet
- Garrison/HQ: Yokosuka; New Caledonia (intended); Rabaul; Buka; Buin
- Aircraft flown: Aichi D3A; Mitsubishi A6M Zero; Nakajima B5N; Nakajima B6N
- Engagements: World War II: Guadalcanal Campaign; Solomon Islands Campaign; New Guinea Campaign; Naval Battle of Guadalcanal (Note: As 582nd Air Group.); Battle of Buna–Gona; Operation KE; Operation I-Go; Operation SO and SE; Landings on Rendova; Battle of Vella Lavella; New Georgia campaign; Landing at Lae; Battle of Arawe; Landing at Finschhafen; Landings at Cape Torokina

Commanders
- Notable commanders: Fumito Inoue; Akira Kurakane; Saburō Shindō; Tamotsu Ema

The 2nd Air Group (第二航空隊, Dai-ni Kōkūtai) was a unit of the Imperial Japanese Navy Air Service (IJNAS) during the Pacific War that was involved in the Guadalcanal Campaign, Solomon Islands Campaign and New Guinea Campaign. The air group was redesignated as the 582nd Air Group on 1 November 1942.

== History ==
The group was formed on 31 May 1942 in Yokosuka, Empire of Japan as a mixed fighter and dive bomber unit, where initial strength included 16 Aichi D3A dive bombers and 16 Mitsubishi A6M Zero (Model 32) fighters. The group was commanded by Lieutenant Fumito Inoue as Hikōtaichō, who also led the dive bomber squadron within the group. The fighter squadron was commanded by Lieutenant Akira Kurakane as Buntaichō. It was intended to serve as a garrison for New Caledonia after it would be captured in the planned Operation FS. After the disaster at Midway, the plan for Operation FS was canceled and the unit was ordered to move to Rabaul on New Britain. They embarked on the converted carrier Yawata Maru (later it became Un'yō) and were ferried to Rabaul. During the reorganization of the Imperial Japanese Navy on 14 July, the group was first assigned under the 8th Fleet, before it was transferred to the 25th Air Flotilla of 11th Air Fleet. They arrived at Rabaul on 6 August with 16 D3A dive bombers and 15 A6M3 Zero fighters, just one day prior to the unexpected Allied invasion of Guadalcanal and Tulagi. Prior to that, on 29 July, tanker No. 2 Nisshin Maru delivered further 20 Model 32 Zeros to be used by the group.

Since the 2nd Air Group possessed the new Model 32 Zeros with a reduced range compared to the older Model 21, they could not reach Guadalcanal and return to Rabaul, and neither could the dive bombers. Nevertheless, after being shocked by the unexpected invasion on 7 August, Rear Admiral Sadayoshi Yamada sent nine unescorted D3A dive bombers under the command of Lieutenant Inoue to strike the Allied shipping near Tulagi. This meant that each dive bomber carried only two 60 kg bombs, instead of a standing load of one 250 kg bomb, and more importantly, that they had to ditch near the Shortland Islands after the strike. Inoue's bombers attacked US destroyer Mugford off Tulagi and scored a single hit. However, they were intercepted by a dozen VF-5 and VF-6 Grumman F4F Wildcat fighters from US carriers that were covering the invasion force, where five D3A dive bombers were lost. The surviving four (including Inoue) then ditched near the Shortland Islands where they were picked up by the seaplane tender Akitsushima and one Kawanishi H8K flying boat.

The fighter squadron under Lieutenant Kurakane mainly served as Rabaul air defence until 22 August, after which they moved to temporarily support the Japanese operations around New Guinea; first, they operated from Lae and then from Buna airfields. Eight dive bombers under Lieutenant Inoue followed to Buna on 24 August. The group covered unsuccessful invasion of Milne Bay, before returning to Rabaul via Lae: bombers on 28 August and fighters on 8 September, respectively. When the airfield at Buka was available to stage from, 21 Model 32 Zeros and five D3A moved there on 29 September to cover the build-up of Shortland harbor and to provide air cover for resupply convoys bound for Guadalcanal. For example, they covered high-speed transport Nisshin when it delivered heavy equipment to Guadalcanal on 3 and 8 October, after which they withdrew to Rabaul and 6th Air Group took over the Buka–Bougainville area.

In the meantime, the rest of the group used borrowed Model 21 Zeros to escort periodic raids against Guadalcanal. On 12 September, Lieutenant Kurakane led 15 Zero fighters (including three from 6th Air Group) to escort 26 Mitsubishi G4M medium bombers to Rabaul. The ensuing air combat with 28 Wildcat fighters from Henderson Field resulted in six bombers and one Zero lost, while two Wildcats crashed. Two days later, on 14 September, Lieutenant Kurakane made a reconnaissance sweep over Guadalcanal to see if the ground forces under Major General Kiyotake Kawaguchi managed to capture Henderson Field. Another fighter sweep was made on 27 September but Lieutenant Kurakane's 12 Zeros missed the combat. On 11 October, Lieutenant (jg) Tokitane Futagami led eight 2nd Air Group fighters in a large strike consisting of 45 G4M bombers and 29 Zeros against Guadalcanal. On 14 October, Lieutenant Kurakane led 15 Zeros to escort 26 G4M bombers in a periodic raid against Rabaul, where the ensuing air combat resulted in the loss of three bombers and one Wildcat. On 20 October, Lieutenant (jg) Futagami led 13 Zeros (including six of Tainan Air Group) to escort nine G4M bombers to Guadalcanal, while the next day 2nd Air Group Zeros participated in a similar raid.

On 22 October, the group's dive bombers operating from Buin took part in an anti-shipping strike against Guadalcanal, where six D3A under Reserve Lieutenant (jg) Ekai Yoshikawa joined another six from 31st Air Group under Reserve Lieutenant Norimasa Kitamura. The dive bombers attacked the destroyer Nicholas but failed to score any hits. The escorting Zero fighters under Lieutenant Mitsugi Kofukuda from the 6th Air Group failed to protect them against the intercepting Wildcat fighters, which resulted in the loss of two dive bombers.

On 1 November 1942, the 2nd Air group was redesignated as the 582nd Air Group. Under the new name, the air group continued to participate in Guadalcanal Campaign. The group was involved in the Naval Battle of Guadalcanal, where they first protected the crippled battleship Hiei and then Rear Admiral Raizō Tanaka's transports carrying fresh troops and supplies to Guadalcanal. In both cases, the patrols consisted of Zero fighters and were led by Warrant Officer Kazuo Tsunoda. Lieutenant Kurakane was injured in a landing accident on 11 November after leading 582nd fighters to escort medium bombers to Guadalcanal

By mid-November, the 582nd Air Group incorporated aircrew and aircraft from other dive bomber units, i.e., the 954th (ex-31st) Air Group and 956th (ex-35th) Air Group. The aircraft strength was increased to 24 dive bombers and 36 fighters. Newly promoted Lieutenant Commander Inoue remained the group's Hikōtaichō and commanded the dive bomber squadron, while Lieutenant Saburō Shindō (Kurakane's replacement) commanded the fighter squadron. Lieutenant Tatsuo Takahata (ex-35th) and Reserve Lieutenant Kitamura (ex-31st) became Buntaichō in the dive bomber squadron, while Lieutenant (jg) Usaburō Suzuki was Buntaichō in the fighter squadron. When Allies started the offensive against Buna–Gona on 16 November 1942, Lieutenant Commander Inoue led nine dive bombers from Rabaul to attack Allied supply ships east of Buna on New Guinea. Afterwards, the 582nd Air Group moved to Lae and on 17 November made another attack on the ships. From there, they made several raids with D3A dive bombers and Zeros against Allied ground forces. They returned to Rabaul on 28 November but continued to conduct attacks on Buna until the end of December. Lieutenant Commander Inoue and Reserve Lieutenant Kitamura led most of the missions.

In February 1943, the group was involved in covering the evacuation of Japanese troops from Guadalcanal. While leading 15 dive bombers in an attack on Allied ships near Savo Island on 1 February, Lieutenant Kitamura was shot down and killed in action, along with four other dive bombers. However, they sank one destroyer and damaged another one. The escorting Zeros under Lieutenants Shindō and Suzuki managed to shoot down three Wildcats for the loss of three of their own.

In April 1943, the group participated in Operation I-Go. On 7 April, the group's new Hikōtaichō, Lieutenant Tatsuo Takahata, led 17 dive bombers against Allied shipping around Tulagi, which were escorted by Suzuki's 21 Zeros. The intercepting Allied fighters accounted for four dive bombers (including Takahata) and one Zero shot down. The group's fighters escorted medium bombers in raids against Port Morseby and Milne Bay on 12 and 14 April, respectively. During the Operation SE on 16 June, the group's 24 D3A dive bombers under Lieutenant Tamotsu Ema made a strike against Allied shipping around Guadalcanal, where the group's new Hikōtaichō, Lieutenant Commander Saburō Shindō, led 16 Zeros to escort them. They lost 13 dive bombers and four Zeros in the attack.

Finally, the group's fighter unit was disbanded on 1 August 1943 and some pilots were transferred to 201st and 204th Air Groups. The group then became a fully bomber unit and later on also absorbed Aichi D3A dive bombers and Nakajima B5N and B6N torpedo bombers from other units, such as from Ryūhō and Jun'yō Air Groups on 1 September. It continued to participate in the Solomon Islands campaign and New Guinea campaign, including in attacking Allied ships during landings on Rendova, on New Georgia, on Vella Lavella, at Lae, at Arawe, at Finschhafen and finally at Cape Torokina.

== Sources ==
- Caidin, Martin; Okumiya, Masatake; Hirokoshi, Jiro (2014). Zero!. Verdun Press. ASIN B06XGL1T5Z.
- Chambers, Mark (2017). Nakajima B5N 'Kate' and B6N 'Jill' Units. Combat Aircraft Book #119. Osprey Publishing. ISBN 978-1-4728-1874-4.
- Frank, Richard B. (1990). Guadalcanal: The Definitive Account of the Landmark Battle. New York: Penguin Group. ISBN 0-14-016561-4.
- Hata, Ikuhiko; Izawa, Yasuho; Shores, Christopher (2011). Japanese Naval Air Force Fighter Units and their aces, 1932-1945. London, UK: Grub Street. ISBN 978-1-906502-84-3.
- Lundstrom, John B. (2005b). First Team and the Guadalcanal Campaign: Naval Fighter Combat from August to November 1942 (New ed.). Annapolis, Maryland: Naval Institute Press. ISBN 1-59114-472-8.
- Millman, Nicholas (2019). A6M Zero-sen Aces 1940-42. Aircraft of the Aces #137. Osprey Publishing. ISBN 978-1-4728-2144-7.
- Morison, Samuel Eliot (2001). Breaking the Bismarcks Barrier. History of United States Naval Operations in World War II. Vol. 6 (Reprint ed.). Boston: Little Brown and Company. ISBN 0-7858-1307-1. OCLC 10310299.
- Stille, Mark (2019). Guadalcanal 1942–43: Japan's bid to knock out Henderson Field and the Cactus Air Force. Air Campaign. Osprey Publishing. ISBN 978-1-4728-3551-2.
- 江間, 保 (1991). 急降下爆撃隊—日本海軍のヘルダイバー (in Japanese). 今日の話題社. ISBN 4-87565-138-4.
- 小福田, 晧文 (2004). 指揮官空戦記―ある零戦隊長のリポート (光人社NF文庫) (in Japanese). 光人社; 新装. ISBN 4-7698-2044-5.
- 松浪, 清 (2014). ラバウル艦爆隊始末記―ソロモン航空戦の全貌 (光人社NF文庫) (New ed.). 潮書房光人新社. ISBN 978-4-7698-2848-8.

=== Combat reports ===
- 海軍大臣官房. 2空飛行機隊戦闘行動調書 (Report). Japan Center for Asian Historical Records.
- 海軍大臣官房. 582空飛行機隊戦闘行動調書 (Report). Japan Center for Asian Historical Records.
