= Sadamu Komachi =

Japanese World War II flying ace

- 小町 定
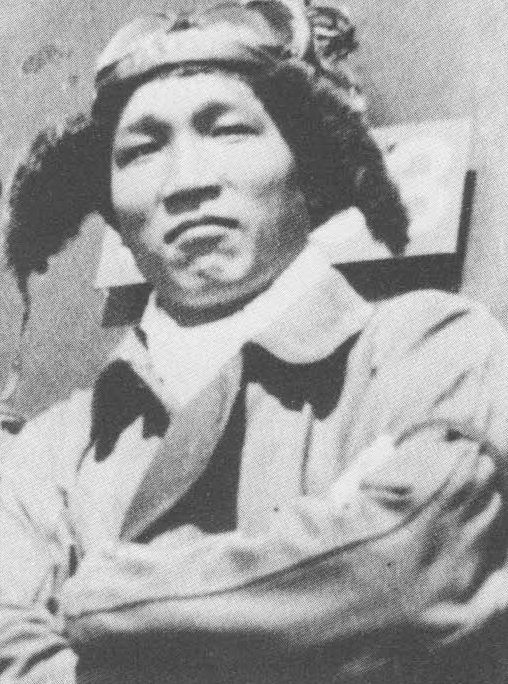
- Komachi aboard the carrier Shōkaku in early 1942.
- Born: 18 April 1920; Ishikawa, Japan
- Died: 15 July 2012 (aged 92)
- Military career
- Allegiance: Empire of Japan
- Branch: Imperial Japanese Navy Air Service (IJN)
- Rank: Warrant Officer
- Units: Shōkaku; 204th Air Group; 253rd Air Group; Yokosuka Air Group
- Conflicts: World War II; Attack on Pearl Harbor; Indian Ocean raid; Battle of the Coral Sea; Solomon Islands Campaign; Battle of the Eastern Solomons; Battle of the Santa Cruz Islands; Defence of Rabaul; Battle of the Philippine Sea; Bombing of Tokyo

Sadamu Komachi (小町 定, Komachi Sadamu; 18 April 1920 – 15 July 2012) was an ace fighter pilot in the Imperial Japanese Navy (IJN) during World War II. Participating in many of the Pacific War battles and campaigns as a member of several units, Komachi was officially credited with having destroyed 18 enemy aircraft.

== Early life ==
Sadamu Komachi was born in 1920 in Ishikawa Prefecture, Japan. He was the third son of a part-farmer, part-merchant family. In 1938, he enlisted into the navy and was trained for six months at the Kure Kaiheidan. He was then briefly stationed on the battleship Fusō before he applied and was accepted for the enlisted pilot training program. In June 1940, he graduated from the 49th class and was selected for a fighter specialisation, which took place at Ōmura Air Group on Kyushu. He first flew the A6M Zero fighter in the autumn of 1940.

He was reassigned to the aircraft carrier Akagi in October 1940 for carrier-based fighter specialization. In May 1941 he was assigned to the fighter squadron of the newly built aircraft carrier Shōkaku and in the autumn of the same year took part in naval exercises around Kyushu in preparation for the Attack on Pearl Harbor.

== Pacific War ==
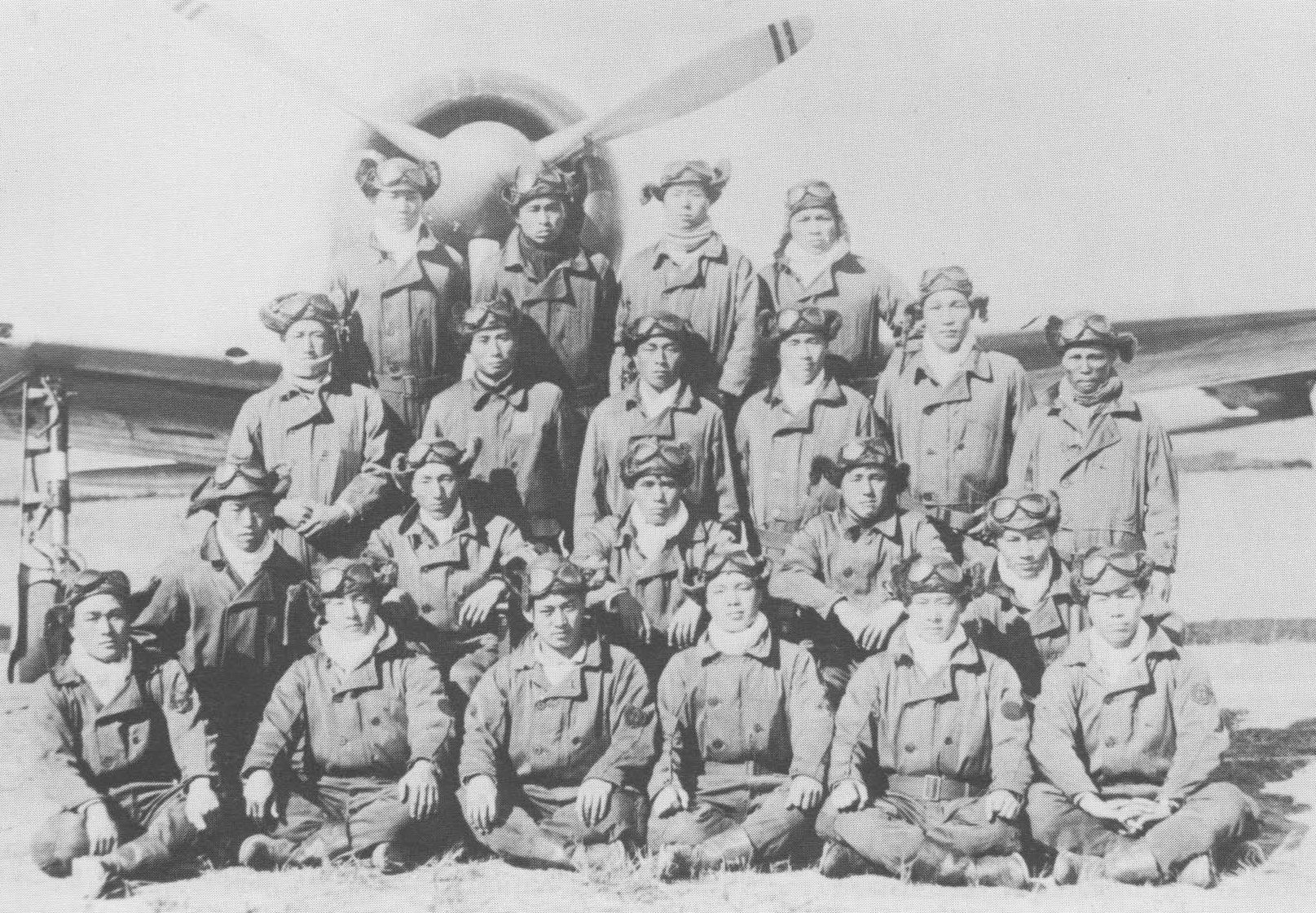
Sadamu Komachi (second row from the top, second from the right) in a Shōkaku fighter squadron group photo prior to the Attack on Pearl Harbor.

During the Attack on Pearl Harbor he was assigned to cover the carrier fleet as part of the combat air patrol (CAP) and therefore did not see any combat. During the Indian Ocean Raid, he was again assigned to cover the carrier fleet. There he saw air combat for the first time and had a dogfight with a British Hurricane fighter. While he managed to hit the enemy fighter, which started to emit smoke, he could not confirm the crash and was therefore not officially credited with the kill.

In May 1942, Petty Officer Third Class Komachi participated in Operation MO that resulted in the Battle of the Coral Sea. He was assigned to CAP that was protecting the IJN carrier fleet. He first defended the carriers against the strike force from Yorktown and half an hour later against the strike force from Lexington. He was credited with shooting down one SBD Dauntless dive bomber and one F4F Wildcat fighter, and additionally with four shared probables. Since the flight deck of his carrier Shōkaku was damaged in the battle, he was forced to land on Zuikaku instead. After the battle, Shōkaku was sent to be repaired and therefore IJN 5th Carrier Division did not participate in the subsequent Battle of Midway.

During the Battle of the Eastern Solomons in late August 1942, Petty Officer Komachi was assigned to cover the strike force that attacked US carriers. The escort of nine Zeros was led by Lieutenant Yasuhiro Shigematsu. When they spotted US Navy (USN) aircraft approaching the IJN fleet, five of them broke away from the strike force to attack the enemy. Komachi did not break away with his section leader Petty Officer First Class Shigetaka Ōmori but stayed with the strike force leader Shigematsu. However, this left only four escorting Zeros with the strike force.

As a result of the five other Zeros abandoning the escort duty, when the remaining four arrived over the US fleet, they were outnumbered by the enemy CAP. While engaged in a lengthy dogfight near USN carriers, Petty Officer Komachi hit a couple of Wildcats, however, he did not have the time to confirm their crashes. At one point he countered a surprise attack by a Wildcat by dropping his Zero into an intentional spin, from which he recovered at low altitude. Komachi survived the dogfight and proceeded to the meeting point where the dive and torpedo bombers would wait for the fighters in order to lead them back to the friendly carriers. However, when he arrived at the meeting point, the strike force had already left and he was forced to navigate back to the friendly carriers on his own during the late afternoon. He could not manage to locate the carriers before sunset and was forced to make an emergency landing on water. He was later picked up by one of the friendly destroyers.

During the Battle of the Santa Cruz Islands in late October 1942, Petty Officer Komachi was involved in defending the IJN fleet against US aircraft, while the Japanese strike force eventually sank the carrier Hornet and badly damaged the carrier Enterprise. During the CAP, he and his section leader Petty Officer Ōmori attacked the USN strike group led by Lieutenant Commander Gus Widhelm that was approaching IJN carriers. They managed to shoot down two SBD Dauntless dive bombers (including that of Widhelm) and damage two more to an extent that they were forced to abort. Nevertheless, the rest passed through the CAP and attacked Shōkaku; causing severe damage to the carrier.

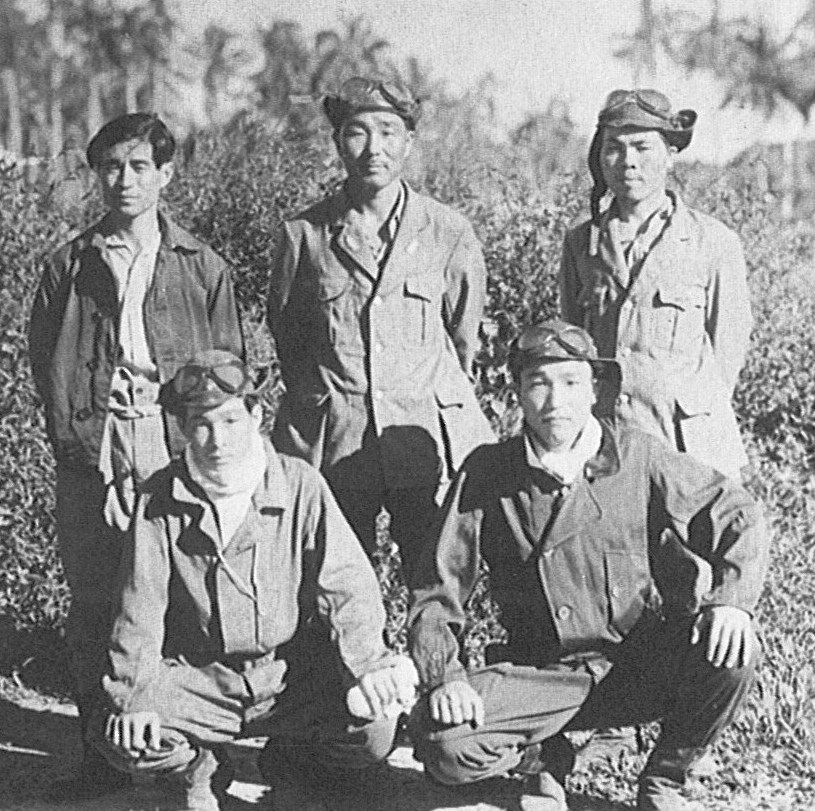
Sadamu Komachi (bottom right) as part of the 253rd Air Group in February 1944.

In the autumn of 1942, he returned to Ōmura airbase on Kyushu and served as an instructor for fighter pilot specialization. There he married Katsumi Furuta; a woman he met during his training. In August 1943 he was transferred to Rabaul airbase in the South Pacific, where he saw extensive air combat for several months. There he served with 204th Air Group and 253rd Air Group, and fought alongside Tetsuzō Iwamoto in the defence of Rabaul, where they faced almost daily Allied raids that typically consisted of 100 or more aircraft. During the defence of Rabaul, he also helped to develop methods for using Type 3 air-bursting phosphorus bombs against enemy bomber formations, which were dropped from a Zero fighter above them.

In February 1944, he was moved to Truk. He left Truk in June 1944 in order to participate in the Battle of the Philippine Sea. While he was about to land on an airfield on Guam, his fighter was shot down by USN F6F Hellcat fighters. He made an emergency landing on the coast and was afterwards evacuated to Japan as he sustained a severe burn injury.

Komachi participated in the last air engagement of World War II on 18 August 1945, when he attacked two B-32 Dominators on a photo-reconnaissance mission over Tokyo. One bomber received damage and suffered one crew fatality, but both aircraft returned to Yontan Airfield, Okinawa.

== Later life ==
In 1992 Komachi attended a symposium at Naval Air Station Pensacola, Florida about the Battle of the Coral Sea, as a guest panelist. Komachi died of natural causes on 15 July 2012. He was 92.
