= Fumito =

- Gender: Male

Origin
- Origin: Japanese
- Meaning: Different meanings depending on the kanji used

Fumito (written: 文人, 史人 or 郁人) is a masculine Japanese given name. Notable people with the name include:

- Fumito Inoue (井上 文刀), Japanese dive bomber pilot officer
- Fumito Iwai (岩井 郁人; born 1990), Japanese musician
- Fumito Tomoi (友井 史人; born 1975), Japanese television personality
- Fumito Ueda (上田 文人; born 1970), Japanese video game designer
