= Kazuo Tsunoda =

Japanese flying ace (1918–2013)

- 角田 和男
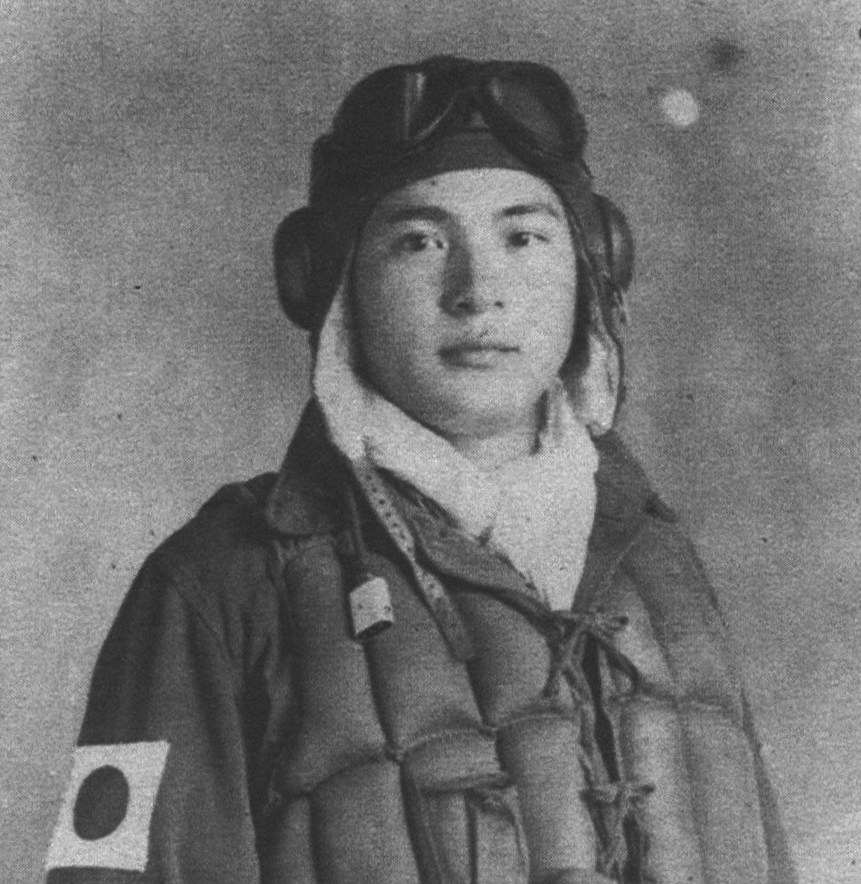
- Tsunoda, immediately after the war, in Taichung
- Born: October 11, 1918; Minamibōsō, Chiba, Japan
- Died: February 14, 2013 (aged 94); Ibaraki Prefecture, Japan
- Military career
- Allegiance: Empire of Japan
- Branch: Imperial Japanese Navy Air Service (IJN)
- Rank: Lieutenant Junior Grade
- Conflicts: Second Sino-Japanese War; World War II; Pacific War

Kazuo Tsunoda (角田 和男, Tsunoda Kazuo; October 11, 1918 – February 14, 2013) was an officer and ace fighter pilot in the Imperial Japanese Navy (IJN) during the Second Sino-Japanese War and Pacific Campaign of World War II. In his combat career, Tsunoda was officially credited with destroying nine enemy aircraft.

From May 1942 to May 1943, Tsunoda participated in the New Guinea Campaign, Solomon Islands and Guadalcanal Campaigns as a member of the 2nd Air Group and 582 Air Group. During the Naval Battle of Guadalcanal on 14 November 1942, Tsunoda was shot down near the Russell Islands while covering an army transport convoy delivering troops to Guadalcanal. Tsunoda was rescued by the destroyer Amagiri.

In November 1944, while stationed at Cebu in the Philippines, Tsunoda volunteered as a kamikaze pilot. He was unable, however, to find any enemy ships to attack. Later, he escaped the Philippines to Japanese-occupied Taiwan after the American landings and survived the war.

He was a farmer in Ibaraki prefecture after the war. He died on February 14, 2013.
