= Tadashi Kaneko =

Japanese flying ace

- 兼子 正
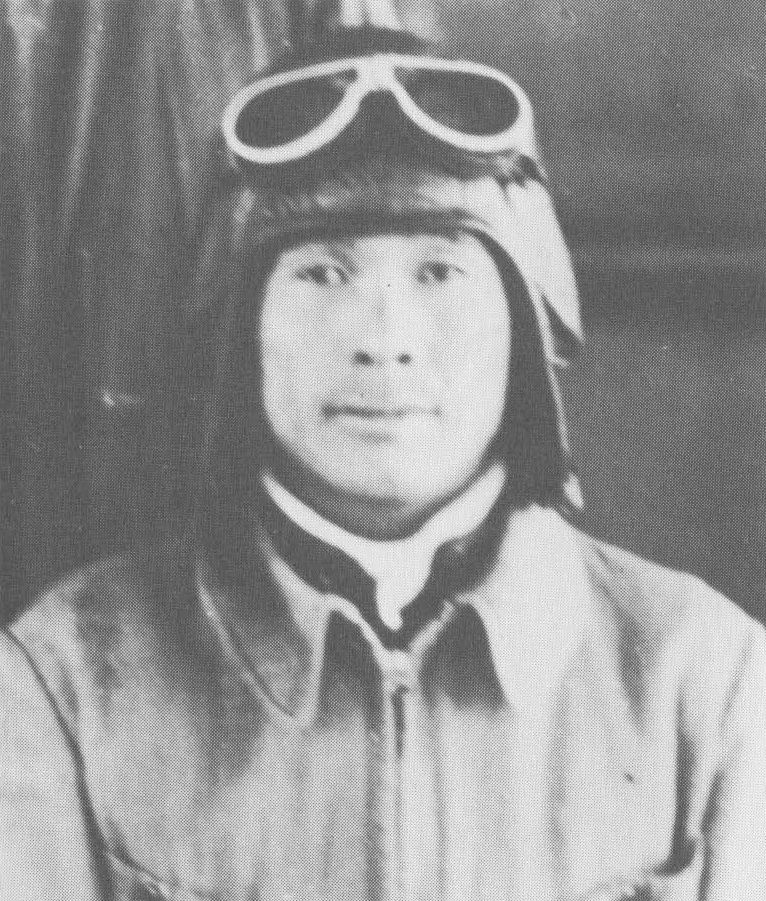
- Kaneko in 1936 or 1937 while serving on the aircraft carrier Ryūjō
- Born: 25 February 1912; Tokyo, Japan
- Died: 14 November 1942 (aged 30); Solomon Islands
- Military career
- Allegiance: Empire of Japan
- Branch: Imperial Japanese Navy Air Service (IJN)
- Rank: Commander
- Units: Ryūjō; 15th Air Group; 12th Air Group; Shōkaku; 6th Air Group; Hiyō
- Conflicts: Second Sino-Japanese War; World War II; Battle of Midway; Guadalcanal Campaign; Naval Battle of Guadalcanal †

Tadashi Kaneko (兼子 正, Kaneko Tadashi; 25 February 1912 – 14 November 1942) was an officer, ace fighter pilot, and leader in the Imperial Japanese Navy (IJN) during the Second Sino-Japanese War and the Pacific War. Before his death in combat, Kaneko was officially credited with destroying eight enemy aircraft.

== Early career ==
He attended Tokyo First Middle School, (now Hibiya High School). He entered the Imperial Japanese Navy Academy and graduated from the 60th class in November 1932. At the outbreak of the Second Sino-Japanese War in 1937, Lieutenant (jg) Kaneko was posted as a section leader (Shōtaichō) in the carrier Ryūjō's fighter group. On 22 August, he led four Nakajima A4N fighters on patrol near Shanghai, where they encountered and engaged 18 Chinese Air Force Hawk III fighter-attack planes. During the surprise attack, his section claimed six shot down, including that of acting 4th Pursuit Group commanding officer Captain Wang Tien-Hsiang (standing-in for the wounded Colonel Gao Zhihang); two of the Hawks which were credited to him.

In August 1938, Lieutenant Kaneko was posted as a division leader (Buntaichō) in the 15th Air Group in Central China, where his unit mainly provided base defense and support for the ground forces. In April 1939, he was assigned as a buntaichō of the 12th Air Group that was based in Hankou, but saw no further combat. He then served in a couple of units based in Japan, before being appointed as a fighter squadron commander of the newly commissioned carrier Shōkaku in September 1941.

== Pacific War ==
Lieutenant Kaneko participated in the attack on Pearl Harbor in December 1941 and the Indian Ocean Raid in April 1942. During the Indian Ocean Raid, he claimed shooting down three British Hawker Hurricane fighters and therefore achieved the status of ace. In May, he was transferred to the 6th Air Group and became its commander. The unit was intended to be the airbase garrison unit on Midway Atoll after its capture in the upcoming Operation MI. Taking passage aboard the carrier Akagi, Lieutenant Kaneko participated in the Battle of Midway, where he defended the carriers against the attacks from Midway-based bombers. He claimed to have shot down two American bombers before his carrier Akagi got hit and set ablaze. Nevertheless, He was rescued and returned to Japan.

Following the Battle of Midway, Lieutenant Kaneko was assigned as the group leader (Hikōtaichō) of the carrier Hiyō. In October 1942, the carrier was sent to the Solomon Islands. On 17 October, Lieutenant Kaneko led the fighter escort for the combined Hiyō and Jun'yō strike against the Henderson Field. The strike did very little damage in exchange for most of the Nakajima B5N bomber lost. His fighters shot down one Grumman F4F Wildcat fighter, but lost Hiyō ace Petty Officer Kaname Harada, who had to crash-land.

Several days later, Hiyō experienced a mechanical failure and its air group was transferred to a land base at Buin through Rabaul. The group operated from Buin where Lieutenant Kaneko led almost daily missions against the Cactus Air Force. During one of the raids on 11 November, he claimed shooting down three enemy Wildcat fighters. On 1 November, he was promoted to lieutenant commander. On 14 November, during the Naval Battle of Guadalcanal, he and his squadron flew a Combat Air Patrol over the convoy of cargo ships that were delivering Imperial Japanese Army troops and supplies to Guadalcanal. While attacking the enemy dive bombers that were about to bomb the ships, he was killed by one of the rear gunners. In return, he and his group managed to shoot down three dive bombers and badly damaged two more.
