= Heinkel He 113 =

German deception involving prototype aircraft during WW2

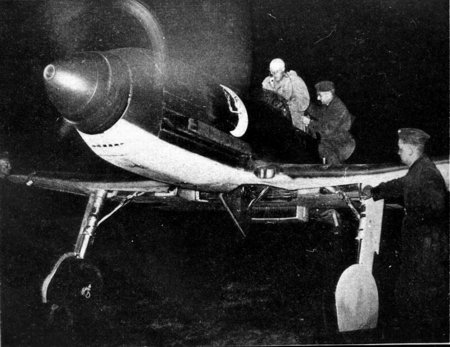
The fictitious He 113 (in reality an He 100 D-1) in a spurious night fighter unit

The Heinkel He 113 was a fictitious German fighter aircraft of World War II, invented as a propaganda and possibly disinformation exercise.

== Development ==
In 1940, Nazi Minister of Propaganda Joseph Goebbels publicised the fact that a new fighter was entering service with the Luftwaffe. The plan involved taking pictures of Heinkel He 100 D-1s at different air bases around Germany, each time sporting a new paint job for various fictional fighter groups. The pictures were then published in the press with the He 113 name, sometimes billed as night fighters (despite lacking even a landing light).

The aircraft also appeared in a series of "action shot" photographs in various magazines such as Der Adler, including claims that it had proven itself in combat in Denmark and Norway. One source claims that the aircraft were on loan to the one Luftwaffe Staffel in Norway for a time, but this might be a case of the same misinformation working many years later.

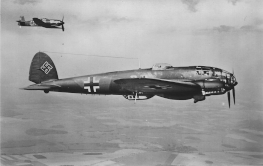
A Heinkel He 111 escorted by a He 113 on a postcard photo

He 113 illustrations from Air Publication AP1764 published March 1940

It is unclear even today exactly whom this effort was intended to impress—foreign air forces or Germany's public—but it seems to have been a successful deception. British intelligence featured the aircraft in AIR 40/237, a report on the Luftwaffe that was completed in 1940. There the top speed was listed as 628 km/h (390 mph). It also states the wing was 15.5 m^{2} (167 ft²) and it noted that the aircraft was in production. Reports of 113s encountered and shot down were listed throughout the early years of the war, including citations in The London Gazette.

== Specifications (He 100D-1 {He 113}) ==
He 113 silhouette used by aircraft spotters in 1940

Data from The Complete Book of Fighters

General characteristics

- Crew: 1
- Length: 8.2 m (26 ft 11 in)
- Wingspan: 9.42 m (30 ft 11 in)
- Height: 3.6 m (11 ft 10 in) tail raised to flying attitude
- Wing area: 14.6 m^{2} (157 sq ft)
- Empty weight: 1,810 kg (3,990 lb)
- Gross weight: 2,500 kg (5,512 lb)
- Powerplant: 1 × Daimler-Benz DB 601M inverted V-12 direct-injection super-charged liquid-cooled piston engine, 876 kW (1,175 hp)
- Propellers: 3-bladed constant-speed propeller

Performance

- Maximum speed: 670 km/h (420 mph, 360 kn) at 5,000 m (16,000 ft)
- Range: 1,010 km (630 mi, 550 nmi)
- Service ceiling: 11,000 m (36,000 ft)
- Time to altitude: 2,000 m (6,600 ft) in 2.2 minutes

Armament

- Guns:
  - 1 × 20 mm (0.787 in) MG FF cannon, engine mounted as a Motorkanone
  - 2 × 7.92 mm (0.312 in) MG 17 machine guns
