= Terufumi Kofukuda =

Fighter pilot in the Imperial Japanese Navy (IJN) during World War II

- 小福田 晧文
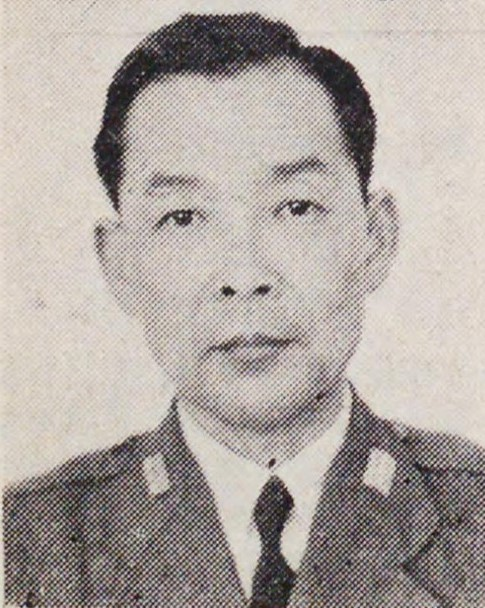
- Born: February 1909; Tsuyama, Okayama, Japan
- Died: 29 July 1995 (aged 86)
- Military career
- Allegiance: Empire of Japan; Japan
- Branch: Imperial Japanese Navy Air Service (IJNAS); Japan Air Self-Defense Force (JASDF)
- Rank: Commander (IJNAS); Lieutenant General (JASDF)
- Units: Kaga; Ryūjō; 12th Air Group; 14th Air Group; 6th Air Group / 204th Air Group
- Conflicts: Second Sino-Japanese War; Battle of Wuhan; World War II; Solomon Islands Campaign; Naval Battle of Guadalcanal; New Guinea Campaign

Terufumi Kofukuda (小福田 晧文, Kofukuda Terufumi; February 1909 – 29 July 1995), born as Mitsugi Kofukuda (小福田 租, Kofukuda Mitsugi), was an officer and a fighter pilot in the Imperial Japanese Navy (IJN) during World War II. He participated in various battles and campaigns throughout the Pacific War. After the war, he served in the new Japanese Self Defence Force (JSDF) as the commander of the Central Air Defense Force.

== Early career ==
Mitsugi Kofukuda enrolled in the Imperial Japanese Naval Academy in April 1928 and graduated as part of the 59th class in November 1931. In November 1933, he started the navy pilot training program and after completing the basic course in autumn 1934, he was selected for fighter specialisation at Ōmura Air Group. In December 1935, he was assigned to the fighter squadron of the aircraft carrier Kaga. At the beginning of 1937, he was transferred to Ōminato Air Group on the northern tip of Honshu, where he was experimenting with aircraft operating in show and winter conditions. In May 1937, he was posted to Kasumigaura as a flight instructor.

In December 1937, Kofukuda was promoted to full lieutenant and assigned to the carrier Ryūjō as its fighter squadron leader (Buntaichō). In June 1938, he was posted to the 12th Air Group in Central China, which operated from Nanjing at that time, but then gradually moved to Anqing, Jiujiang and finally to Hankou with the Japanese advance up the Yangtze river. He returned to Japan in December 1938 and was assigned to Ōita Air Group. In November 1939, Lieutenant Kofukuda was transferred to 14th Air Group, which moved to Hanoi, Indochina in Autumn 1940. On 7 October, he led six new Mitsubishi A6M Zero fighters to escort a strike of 27 Mitsubishi G3M bombers against Kunming. In the ensuing air battle with Chinese fighters, they claimed 13 enemy aircraft destroyed.

In November 1940, Lieutenant Kofukuda was sent to Japan to work at the flight test department of Yokosuka Naval Air Technical Arsenal. First, he worked on testing a new aircraft catapult system for the carrier Kaga. At the end of 1940, he was assigned to test the newly acquired Heinkel He 100 prototype that was shipped from Germany along with Heinkel test pilot Gerhard Nitschke. In the middle of 1941, he conducted flight tests with Nakajima J1N. He also participated in the development of the new Mitsubishi interceptor J2M.

== Pacific War ==
In July 1942, Lieutenant Kofukuda was assigned as the Hikōtaichō of the 6th Air Group, which was intended to be the garrison for Midway Island, which was ultimately not captured by Japan. At the time the unit was stationed at Kisarazu in Japan and was then ordered to move to Rabaul on New Britain on 21 August. Lieutenant Kofukuda led a 5,000-kilometer over-water ferry flight of 18 Zero fighters from Japan to Rabaul via island bases (Iwo Jima, Saipan, Truk and Kavieng), which was unprecedented for a single-seat aircraft at the time. (Note: Lundstorm (2005b) states that only 13 Zeros eventually reached to Rabaul, but both Kofukuda (2004) and Hata, et al. (2011) state that all arrived safely.)

Initially, Lieutenant Kofukuda and his Air Group provided air defence for Rabaul base and air cover for ship convoys, then took part in attacks on Guadalcanal from 11 September 1942. In one such attack on 28 September, Lieutenant Kofukuda led 27 Zeros to escort 27 Mitsubishi G4M bombers. Receiving an early warning from coastwatchers and radar, the US forces from Henderson Field scrambled 35 Grumman F4F Wildcat fighters to intercept the strike, destroying eight G4Ms. In response the Japanese changed tactics, and on 2 October Lieutenant Kofukuda led a fighter sweep of 28 Zeros ahead of nine G4M bombers and eight Zeros, acting as a decoy and turning back before reaching Guadalcanal. His unit managed to surprise the intercepting 36 Wildcats and shot down six of them for the loss of one Zero, in addition to destroying two Douglas SBD Dauntless dive bombers on the way back.

On 8 October 1942, Lieutenant Kofukuda and his unit moved from Rabaul to a newly completed airstrip at Buin on Bougainville. His unit could then operate the new Model 32 Zero fighters, which previously did not have the combat range to reach Guadalcanal from Rabaul. On 22 October, he led nine Zeros to escort a strike of six Aichi D3A dive bombers against Allied ships off Guadalcanal and the next day he led a fighter sweep of 12 Zeros ahead of G4M bombers that attacked Henderson Field.

Kofukuda described a typical fighter sweep mission against Guadalcanal:

It would take about one and a half hours to reach the vicinity of Guadalcanal from Buin. About 20 minutes before the target area, they climbed to 6000 meters, made the basic preparations (i.e., check the oxygen system, load the machine guns, remove the gun sight cover, fasten the seat belts) and formed the attack formation. When the enemy was discovered they switched from the external fuel tank to the main fuel tank. His task as the leader was to guide the formation to an advantageous position, preferably slightly above and behind the enemy and attack from the sun. While the formation engaged the enemy, he checked that there were no other enemy groups around that could surprise them. He would position himself in a spot where he could assist the friendly aircraft, if they got into trouble, and at the same time make sure his group did not get scattered too far. After the fight, he gathered the surviving aircraft and set the course for home base. When withdrawing they had to be watchful for the enemy fighters trying to chase them or ambush them for about 30-40 minutes. After that, they would pull their bento out of their flight suit pocket and have lunch (Inari sushi was particularly popular among the airmen).

On 1 November 1942, Kofukuda's unit was renamed to 204th Air Group, and he was promoted to lieutenant commander in the meantime. On 14 November, he participated in the Naval Battle of Guadalcanal, where he protected Rear Admiral Raizō Tanaka's transports carrying fresh troops and supplies to Guadalcanal. However, during his patrol, he lost two of his Zero fighters, and one transport was hit by enemy SBD dive bombers.

== Later career ==
In March 1943, Lieutenant Commander Kofukuda was transferred to Japan where he served in various posts, including in the development and testing of the new Mitsubishi A7M fighter. He was promoted to commander at the end of the war. He served in the national police during the immediate post-war period and eventually changed his given name. In July 1954, he joined the new Japan Air Self-Defense Force. He rose to the rank of lieutenant general in July 1965 and became the commander of the Central Air Defense Force. He retired in March 1967 and died on 29 July 1995 at the age of 86.
