= Fumito Inoue =

Japanese military officer

- 井上 文刀
- Inoue (center, back row) in 1938
- Military career
- Allegiance: Empire of Japan
- Branch: Imperial Japanese Navy Air Service (IJN)
- Rank: Commander
- Units: 2nd Air Group; 582nd Air Group
- Conflicts: Second Sino-Japanese War; World War II; Guadalcanal Campaign; New Guinea Campaign; Battle of Milne Bay; Battle of Buna–Gona

Fumito Inoue (井上 文刀, Inoue Fumito) was a dive bomber pilot officer in the Imperial Japanese Navy (IJN) during World War II. He was the leader of the 2nd Air Group (later redesignated to 582nd Air Group) during Guadalcanal Campaign and New Guinea Campaign and commanded Rabaul-based dive bombers in various battles in 1942.

== Early career ==
Fumito Inoue graduated from Kobe Merchant Marine College. In May 1933, he became Reserve Ensign and entered a reserve pilot training program of the navy, where he specialized in dive bomber aircraft. On 1 August 1934, he was transferred from reserve officer rank to regular officer rank. In 1938, he served with the 15th Air Group during the Second Sino-Japanese War.

== Pacific War ==
Lieutenant Fumito Inoue became the leader (Hikōtaichō) of the 2nd Air Group when it was formed on 31 May 1942 in Yokosuka, Empire of Japan. He and his group embarked on the converted carrier Yawata Maru and were ferried to Rabaul on New Britain. They arrived at Rabaul on 6 August with 16 Aichi D3A dive bombers and 15 Mitsubishi A6M3 Zero fighters.

After the unexpected Allied invasion of Guadalcanal and Tulagi on 7 August, Lieutenant Inoue led nine unescorted dive bombers to strike the shipping near Tulagi. However, Aichi D3A dive bombers did not possess the combat radius necessary to reach Guadalcanal and return to Rabaul. Lieutenant Inoue was instructed to ditch near the Shortland Islands after the strike, while his dive bombers were equipped only with two 60 kg bombs, instead of a standard load of one 250 kg bomb. He led the attack on the US destroyer Mugford off Tulagi, which resulted in a single bomb hit. He lost five dive bombers when they were intercepted by a dozen of Grumman F4F Wildcat fighters from US carriers. Afterwards, he led the surviving four to Shortland Islands, where they ditched and were picked up by the seaplane tender Akitsushima and one Kawanishi H8K flying boat.

On 24 August, Lieutenant Inoue led eight dive bombers to Buna airfield, where they participated unsuccessful invasion of Milne Bay. On 27 August, they attacked Milne Bay and lost two dive bombers. The next day, he led the remaining dive bombers back to Rabaul.

On 1 November 1942, he was promoted to lieutenant commander, while his group was redesignated as the 582nd Air Group. On 16 November, Allies started the offensive against Buna–Gona, and he led nine dive bombers from Rabaul to attack Allied supply ships east of Buna on New Guinea. After the mission, they landed at Lae and for the time being operated from there. The next day, he led five dive bombers in another attack on the ships. His subordinates led several raids against Allied positions around the Buna area throughout November. On 6 December, he resumed leading the raids himself, where he made an attack on Allied ships around Buna with nine dive bombers. The next day, while leading six dive bombers in another raid, he was wounded in his left ankle and was then withdrawn from combat operations. At the end of the war he was promoted to commander.
