= Neutralisation of Rabaul =

Allied recapture of Rabaul, New Guinea, from Japan during World War II

- Part of the Solomon Islands campaign and New Guinea Campaign of World War II
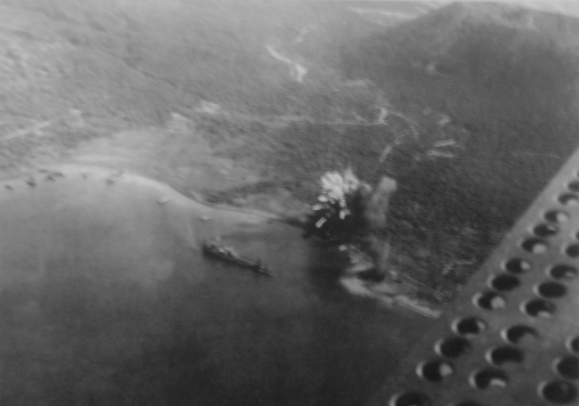
- Photo taken from US Marine SBD dive bomber on 2 August 1944, during an air raid on Rabaul. The aircraft are attacking Rabaul's defenses and a previously sunken cargo ship
Date	17 December 1943 – 8 August 1945
Location	Rabaul, Papua New Guinea
Result	Allied victory

Belligerents
United States; Australia; New Zealand	Japan

Commanders and leaders
George C. Kenney; William Bostock; Frederick C. Sherman	Kumaichi Teramoto

Strength
USMC, USAAF, USN, RAAF, and RNZAF aircraft	IJAAF and IJN aircraft

Casualties and losses
151 aircraft, 25 of them bombers	250 aircraft

The neutralisation of Rabaul was an Allied campaign to render useless the Imperial Japanese base at Rabaul in eastern New Britain, Papua New Guinea. Japanese forces landed on Rabaul on 23 January 1942, capturing it by February 1942, after which the harbor and town were transformed into a major Japanese naval and air installation. The Japanese heavily relied on it, using it as a launching point for Japanese reinforcements to New Guinea and Guadalcanal. Throughout the Solomon Islands campaign, neutralizing Rabaul became the primary objective of the Allied effort in the Solomons.

== Background ==
After its capture by the South Seas Force in February 1942, Rabaul was developed into a major fleet base by the Japanese, eventually becoming the most heavily defended Japanese position in the South Pacific. Rabaul's strategic location, multiple airfields and large natural harbor made it the ideal staging base for ships, aircraft, troops and supplies during the New Guinea and Guadalcanal campaigns. The Japanese Army dug many kilometers of tunnels as shelter from Allied air attacks. They also expanded the facilities by constructing army barracks and support structures. By 1943, there were about 110,000 Japanese troops based in Rabaul.

After the Japanese lost their hold on Guadalcanal in early 1943, Allied forces began the push up the Solomon Islands towards Rabaul. Marine Raiders and United States Army troops landed in the Russell Islands shortly after, and a naval base was established there. U.S. forces then pushed the Japanese out of the New Georgia Islands in August 1943. The Japanese command had invested men and supplies into building an airfield at Munda, all of which proved to be a waste. The U.S. Fifth Air Force aircraft made small attacks in October, and a major Allied air raid on Rabaul took place on 3 November. This raid destroyed 52 Japanese aircraft and 5 warships. Starting on 1 November, U.S. Marines began landing at Cape Torokina on Bougainville Island, where several airfields were constructed by Allied forces. Most of Japan's warships were withdrawn by 6 November.

With the major Japanese possessions around Rabaul captured, Allied air forces could then begin the permanent neutralization of Rabaul. And as part of efforts to isolate the Rabaul base, U.S. Army troops landed at Arawe on western New Britain on 15 December, and the 1st Marine Division landed at Cape Gloucester on 26 December 1943.

== Early air attacks ==
As the major Japanese fleet base in the South Pacific, Rabaul had been under continuous Allied air attack since the first raid by Royal Australian Air Force (RAAF) Catalinas in January 1942. However a lack of resources and the enormous distances involved (Rabaul was 500 miles from the nearest RAAF airfield at Port Moresby) ensured that these attacks remained small and sporadic for nearly two years.

== October – November 1943 bombing raids ==
As a part of Operation Cartwheel the U.S. Fifth Air Force, the Royal Australian Air Force and the Royal New Zealand Air Force (RNAF), all under the command of U.S. General George Kenney, began a sustained bombing campaign against the airfields and port of Rabaul in late 1943. The initial mission was delivered by 349 aircraft on 12 October 1943, but it could not be followed up immediately because of bad weather. A single raid by 50 B-25 Mitchell medium bombers reached the target on 18 October. Sustained attacks resumed on 23 October, culminating in a large raid on 2 November. This series of raids inflicted some negligible damage to Rabaul's facilities and sunk a small number of vessels, but was characterized by massive overclaiming by Kenney and SWPA command, which claimed a very large number of destruction in aircraft, infrastructure and shipping on each raid. Despite the size of the raids, Rabaul retained its air strength, and was greatly bolstered on November 1st after Admiral Koga initiated Operation Ro, transferring nearly the entirety of the Combined Fleet's carrier aircraft, comprising Zuikaku, Shokaku and Zuiho's experienced air groups, totaling 173 carrier aircraft (82 Mitsubishi Type 0 fighters, 45 Type 99 Carrier bombers and 40 Type 97 Carrier Attack planes). This reinforcement package boosted Rabaul's 11th Air Fleet, then possessing around 200 aircraft, and subsequently offered great resistance to the US Fifth Air Force's raid on Rabaul on 2nd November, described as "Putting the toughest fight the 5th Air Force encountered in the whole war". Koga also subsequently ordered the 12th Air Fleet to fly from Japan to reinforce Rabaul.

After the first Japanese attempt to repel the Allied amphibious invasion of Bougainville was thwarted by the United States Navy surface forces at the Battle of Empress Augusta Bay, the Imperial Japanese Navy sent a large naval force from Truk to Rabaul for a second attempt. Lacking a comparable surface force of his own, Admiral William Halsey responded by ordering Rear Admiral Frederick C. Sherman to launch a dawn attack on the Japanese fleet at Rabaul using the airgroups of the aircraft carriers USS Saratoga and USS Princeton, followed up an hour later by a Fifth Air Force raid of B-24 Liberator heavy bombers. These attacks succeeded in damaging six of the seven Japanese cruisers present in Simpson Harbour, ending the Japanese threat to the Bougainville landings. A following raid on 11 November including the three carriers of Task Group 50.3 commanded by Rear Admiral Alfred E. Montgomery inflicted additional damage on the light cruiser Agano and shot down 35 Japanese aircraft.

== Pacification campaign ==
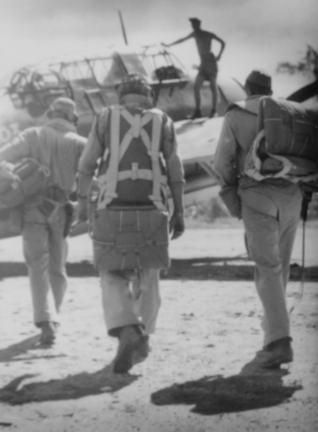
A US Marine TBF Avenger crew prepares for another mission over Rabaul

The capture of Bougainville and Buka brought Rabaul within range of land-based U.S. Navy and Marine Corps tactical bombers, setting the stage for the pacification campaign to follow. Rather than attempt to capture the heavily fortified position, the Allies determined to neutralize Rabaul by isolating it and eliminating its airpower. The first air attack in the pacification campaign was planned for 17 December 1943. It would be based out of Torokina Airfield on Bougainville and consisted of 31 Marine F4U Corsairs, 23 RNZAF P-40 fighters, 22 U.S. Navy F6F Hellcats, and a slightly smaller number of Army Air Forces B-24 bombers. The attack did not receive a large response from the Japanese, so only seven Japanese fighters were lost. Three RNZAF P-40s were lost, two with their pilots. A similar attack took place on 19 December, which cost the Japanese four aircraft, two credited to Marine fighters.

The first "large scale" strike took place on 23 December. Different from previous strikes, the Army Air Forces bombers went in first, and the fighters followed afterwards. Forty Japanese fighters responded this time, with 30 claimed to be destroyed by Allied fighters, though Japanese records do not match the Allied claims. Following another raid on Christmas Eve, U.S. Navy carriers attacked the Japanese force at Kavieng, New Ireland in unison with an air raid on Rabaul. The Navy carriers returned to Kavieng on 1 January 1944.

Throughout January 1944, the Japanese command devoted valuable carrier aircraft and carrier pilots to the defense of Rabaul. The seemingly hopeless situation which the Japanese pilots were being fed into was nicknamed "the sinkhole in the Bismarcks," or the "Bismarcks sinkhole." not including the physical damage done to Rabaul's land defenses. In February, the Japanese command decided to pull all remaining Japanese airmen and their crews from Rabaul. Between 70 and 120 Japanese aircraft flew from Rabaul to Truk (which had recently been raided by U.S. Navy carrier aircraft) on the morning of 19 February. Their valuable mechanics attempted to leave Rabaul by ship on 21 February but their ship, Kokai Maru, was sunk by Allied bombers. This marked the end of Japanese air resistance to Allied planes over Rabaul.

The neutralization of Rabaul was ultimately a disaster for the Japanese. Most of their experienced carrier pilots were lost over Rabaul, large numbers of their sorely needed aviation maintenance personnel were either lost during their attempted evacuation or trapped there, and the Japanese no longer had a base from which they could threaten the Allied presence in the Solomons.

== Isolation and surrender ==
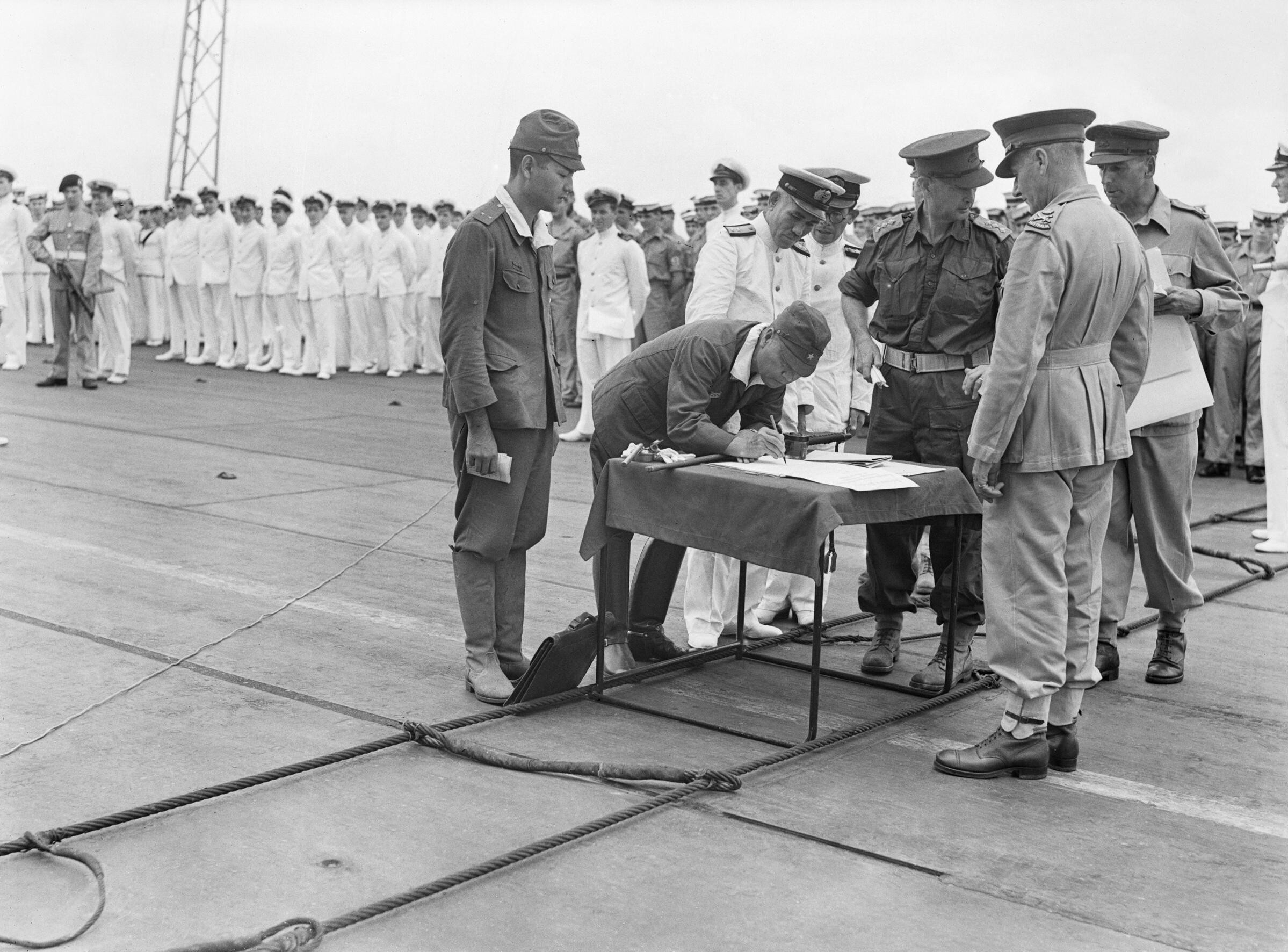
The formal surrender of Japanese forces at Rabaul on 12 September 1945

With Rabaul's offensive capabilities neutralized, the Allies decided to forgo a ground assault, electing instead to reinforce their foothold on the southern coast of New Britain against any potential Japanese counter-attack and resupply, thus allowing the Rabaul garrison to "wither on the vine." By isolating Rabaul, the Allies effectively made its large garrison (which outnumbered the defenders on Okinawa) prisoners of war without having to guard them.

Allied fighters and bombers continued to attack Rabaul through 1944 and 1945. The regular attacks became known as "milk runs" among the Allied air crews. The only opposition over Rabaul was anti-aircraft fire, so attacking became straightforward for Allied airmen and their maintenance crews. Eventually Allied forces came to use Rabaul as a live-fire exercise to give aircrew some taste of combat before committing them elsewhere in the theater. The last Allied airstrike on Rabaul took place on 8 August 1945, only weeks before the Japanese surrender.

Senior officers on Rabaul had a clear picture of the situation, but did not communicate it to the enlisted personnel due to Japanese military doctrine, instead saying that there was order that the men had to hold the position and maintain readiness for an eventual sortie that would be called in the next two years. Regular drills and inspections did maintain discipline in the rank-and-file, in the absence of combat other than defending against occasional Allied air raids. In practice, this meant that most men spent their time farming, raising livestock, or fishing in order to sustain the garrison. These efforts did help reduce starvation somewhat, compared to other Japanese island garrisons in the Pacific that were cut-off from resupply later in the war and never had time to develop a comparable subsistence system of agriculture and foraging. When the Japanese on Rabaul formally surrendered in a ceremony on 12 September 1945, the Australians were astonished at how the Japanese troops still appeared orderly despite years of isolation.
