= 204th Air Group =

The 204 Air Group was a unit of the Imperial Japanese Navy (IJN) during the Pacific campaign of World War II. The unit was formed on 1 November 1942 by re-designating 6th Air Group and served in New Guinea and Rabaul. The air group was disbanded on 4 March 1944.
