= Momo =

Momo may refer to:

== Places ==
- Momo (department), Cameroon, a division of Northwest Province
- Momo, Gabon, a town in the Woleu-Ntem province
- Momo, Piedmont, a town in the province of Novara, Italy
- Joffrey Tower, in Chicago, Illinois, US, originally named the "Modern Momentum Building" and nicknamed "MoMo"

== People ==
=== Given name or nickname ===
==== Athletes ====
- Mohammed Benaziza (1959–1992), Algerian bodybuilder
- Momo Blamo (born 1974), Liberian former football goalkeeper
- Jerónimo Figueroa Cabrera (born 1982), Spanish footballer known as "Momo"
- Momo Cissé (born 2002), Guinean footballer
- Mohamed Diamé (born 1987), French footballer
- Mouhamed Momo Faye (born 2005), Senegalese basketball player in Italy
- Momo Koseki (born 1982), Japanese former professional boxer
- Mamadou Momo Mbaye (born 1998), Senegalese footballer
- Mohamed Sissoko (born 1985), Malian former footballer
- Momo Wandel Soumah (footballer) (1977–2017), Guinean footballer
- Momo Suzuki (born 2007), Japanese snowboarder
- Momo Tamaoki (玉置 桃; born 1994), Japanese judoka
- Momo Yansané (born 1997), Guinean footballer
- Uroš Momić (born 1992), Serbian footballer known as Momo

==== Musicians ====
- Momo (singer) (born Hirai Momo, 1996), Japanese singer
- Momo (Brazilian singer) (born 1979)
- Momo Latiff, also known as "Momo", Malaysian singer of the 1950s
- Momo Kodama (児玉 桃; born 1972), Japanese classical pianist (born 1972)
- Hitomi Momoi (born 1974), J-pop singer, a former member of "I've Sound" and a member of Por
- Momo Wandel Soumah (1926–2003), Guinean singer, composer, and saxophonist
- Momoko Tsugunaga (born 1992), Japanese singer and member of group Berryz Kobo
- Momoe Mori, Japanese entertainer

==== Other people ====
- Momo (artist), American street artist
- Momo (Tonga), the 10th ruler of the Tuʻi Tonga dynasty (south Pacific islands)
- Girolomo Momo Adamo (1895–1956), Italian-American mobster
- Sam Giancana (1908–1975), American mobster nicknamed "Momo"
- Mohamed Henni (born 1989), French-Algerian YouTuber and internet personality
- Momčilo Momo Kapor (1937–2010), Serbian novelist and painter
- Momo Yeung, Chinese actress and ballerina
- Momo Kohgo, ring name of Japanese professional wrestler Shieru Wakana (born 1985)
- Momo Tani, ring name of a Japanese professional wrestler (born 1991)

=== Surname ===
- Epeli Momo (born 1999), Fijian rugby union player
- Giuseppe Momo (1875–1940), Italian architect and engineer
- Romeo Momo (born 1952), Filipino civil engineer and politician

== Arts and entertainment ==
=== Works ===
- Momo (manga), a 2008 Japanese manga by Mayu Sakai
- Momo (novel) (alternatively The Grey Gentlemen), a 1973 novel by Michael Ende
  - Momo (1986 film), based on Ende's novel
  - Momo (2001 film) (Momo alla conquista del tempo), an animated Italian film by Enzo D'Alò based on Ende's novel
  - Momo (2025 film), based on Ende's novel

=== Characters ===
==== In games ====
- Momo (Breath of Fire character), from the video game series Breath of Fire
- MOMO (Xenosaga), from the video game Xenosaga
- Momo, a black cat from the 2016 Google Doodle browser game Magic Cat Academy
- Momo, the female protagonist of Wonder Momo, a Japan-only 1987 arcade game
- Momo Karuizawa, in the video game Project Justice, by Capcom
- Momo Kuzuryū, from Valkyrie Drive- Bhikkhuni

==== In film and television ====
- Momo (Avatar: The Last Airbender), from the animated television series Avatar: The Last Airbender
- MOMO, a main character from the film Madame Rosa, directed by Moshé Mizrahi
- Momo, the heroines of Magical Princess Minky Momo, two different magical-girl anime
- Momo, a main character from the 2003 film Monsieur Ibrahim, directed by François Dupeyron
- Momo, Fuu's pet Japanese dwarf flying squirrel, in the anime series Samurai Champloo
- Momo Kisaragi, a character of mixed media series Kagerou Project
- Momo Kuzuryū, from Valkyrie Drive- Bhikkhuni
- Momo Maruo, from Chouriki Sentai Ohranger
- Momo Minamoto, a main character in the anime Release the Spyce
- Momo Sakura, a minor character in the anime Puella Magi Madoka Magica

==== In manga ====
- Momo, in the manga Parallel Paradise
- Momo Adachi, a main character in the manga series Peach Girl (ピーチガール)
- Momo Ayase, from the manga Dandadan
- Momo Chiyoda, a main character in the manga The Demon Girl Next Door
- Momo Belia Deviluke, from the manga To Love Ru
- Momo Hinamori, in the manga Bleach
- Momo Kisaragi, a character of mixed media series Kagerou Project
- Momo Nishimiya, in the manga Jujutsu Kaisen
- Momo Sohma, from the manga Fruits Basket
- Momo Yaoyorozu, from the manga My Hero Academia
- Takeshi Gouda, nicknamed "Momo", a main character in the manga Tramps Like Us (きみはペット)

==== In novels ====
- Momo, narrator-protagonist of the novel The Life Before Us (La Vie devant soi), by Romain Gary (as Émile Ajar), and the novel's UK title
- Momo, the main character of the 1973 novel of the same name

==== Other characters ====
- Momo the Monster, a legend similar to Bigfoot originating in Missouri in the US
- King Momo (Carnival character), portrayed in numerous Latin American festivities

== Science and technology ==
- Monochorionic-monoamniotic, presentation of identical twins
- MOMO syndrome, a rare genetic disorder
- Momo (software), a Chinese location-based services instant messaging application
- Mozilla Messaging, abbreviated "MoMo"
- MOS-1 (satellite), also known as Momo-1, Japan's first Earth observation satellite
- Momo (rocket), a sounding rocket manufactured by Japanese company Interstellar Technologies

== Transportation ==
=== Ships ===
- Momo-class destroyer, an Imperial Japanese Navy destroyer class
  - Japanese destroyer Momo (1916), the lead ship of the class, commissioned in 1916 and sold in 1940
- Japanese destroyer Momo (1944), a World War II destroyer
- USS Momo (SP-49), a US Navy patrol boat in commission from 1917 to 1919

=== Other uses in transportation ===
- Momo (company), a manufacturer of automotive and racing gear
- Momo Car-Sharing, short for the EU project "more options for energy efficient mobility through Car-Sharing"
- Siemens Modular Metro, a brand of electric train vehicle system

== Other uses ==
- Momo.com, a Taiwanese e-commerce and media company
- Momo (food), a dumpling popular in Tibet, Nepal, Bhutan, and parts of India and Bangladesh
- Momo languages, a group of languages spoken in Cameroon
- Momo Challenge hoax, an urban legend and hoax about a fictitious Internet phenomenon
- Molly Mormon, a stereotype, abbreviated "MoMo"
- Mystery Of Missing Out, a variant of fear of missing out

== See also ==
- Momus or Momos, a Greek god
