= Japanese destroyer Momo =

Two Japanese destroyers have been named Momo (桃, ”peach”):

- Japanese destroyer Momo (1916), the lead ship of the Momo-class destroyer commissioned in 1916 and sold in 1940
- Japanese destroyer Momo (1944), a Matsu-class destroyer launched in March 1944 and sunk in December 1944

== See also ==
- Momo-class destroyer of the Imperial Japanese Navy
- Momo (disambiguation)
