= Japanese ship Hinoki =

Three Japanese ships have been named Hinoki:

- Japanese destroyer Hinoki (1916), a Momo-class destroyer launched in 1916 and broken up in 1940
- Japanese destroyer Hinoki (1944), a Matsu-class destroyer launched in 1944 and sunk in 1945
- JS Hinoki, a Sakura-class patrol ship launched in 2026
