= Transport in Europe =

Transport networks in Europe

E-Road Network over 1990 borders

Operational high-speed railway lines

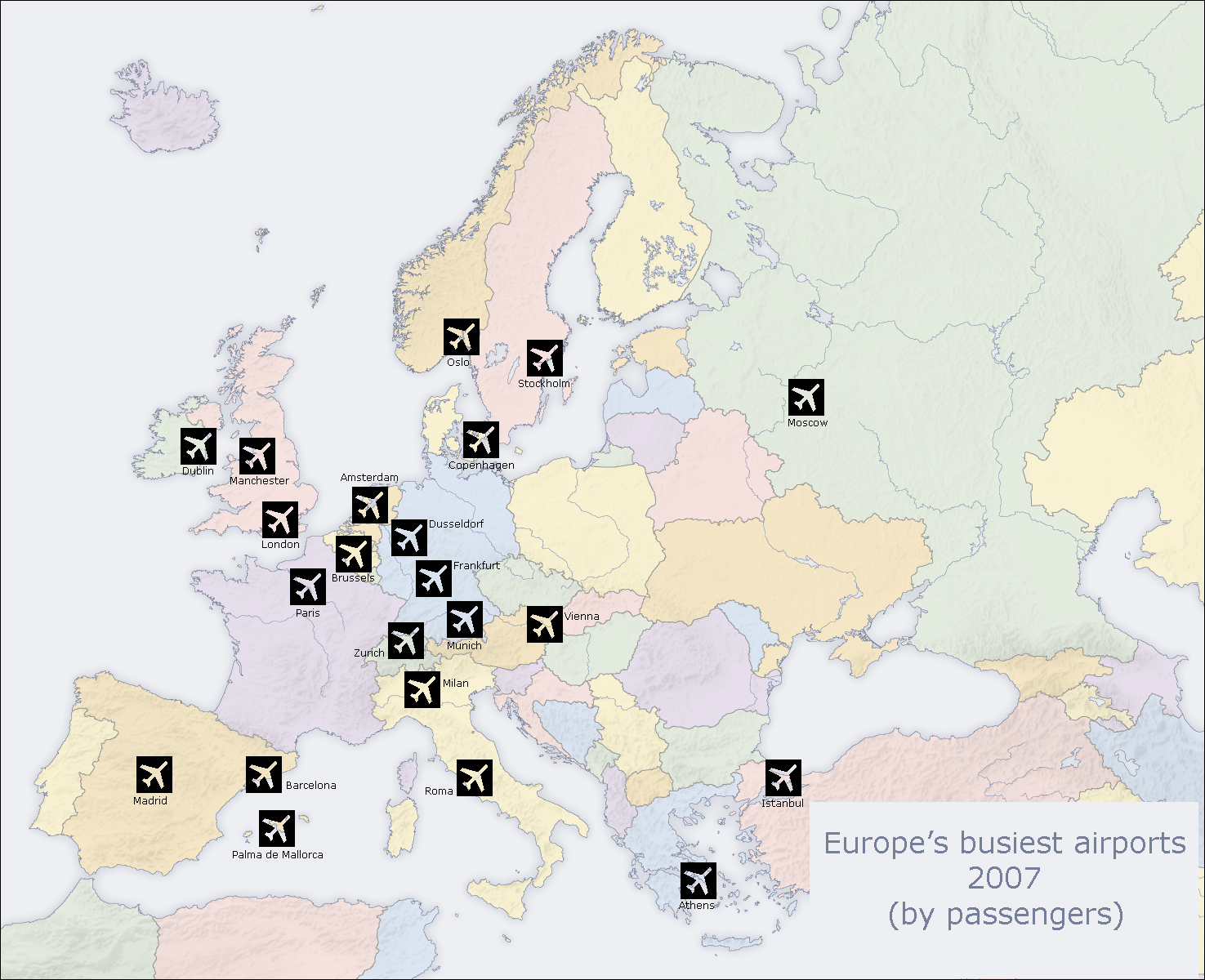
Busiest airports as of 2007

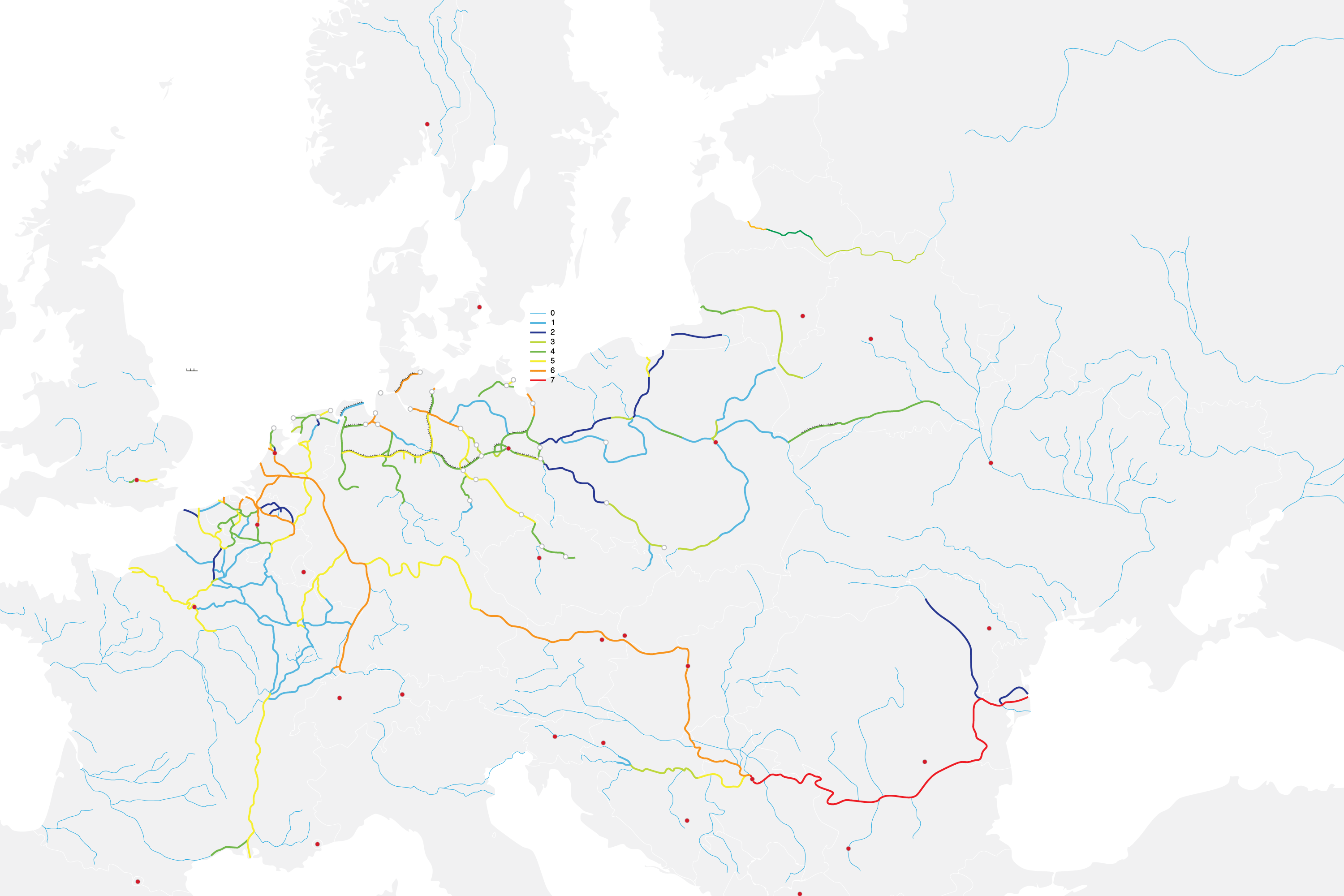
Navigable rivers and canals

Transport in Europe provides for the movement needs of over 700 million people and associated freight.

== Overview ==
The political geography of Europe divides the continent into over 50 sovereign states and territories. This fragmentation, along with increased movement of people since the Industrial Revolution, has led to a high level of cooperation between European countries in developing and maintaining transport networks. Supranational and intergovernmental organisations such as the European Union (EU), Council of Europe and the Organization for Security and Co-operation in Europe have led to the development of international standards and agreements that allow people and freight to cross the borders of Europe, largely with unique levels of freedom and ease.

EU freight transport in 2016
1. Road (51.0%)
2. Sea (33.0%)
3. Rail (12.0%)
4. Inland waterways (4.00%)
5. Air (0.10%)

Road, rail, air and water transportation are all prevalent and important across Europe. Europe was the location of the world's first railways and motorways and is now the location of some of the world's busiest ports and airports. The Schengen Area enables border control-free travel between 26 European countries. Freight transportation has a high level of intermodal compatibility and the European Economic Area allows the free movement of goods across 30 states. Of all tonne-kilometres transported in 2016, 51% were by road, 33% by sea, 12% by rail, 4% by inland waterways, and 0.1% by air.

A review of critical success factors for the delivery of transport infrastructure projects in Europe is presented in a 2017 report.

In October 1998 AccesRail, a Canadian company, launched a solution on the airline industry's Global Distribution Systems (GDS) that allowed major airlines, travel agents, and other online booking websites to book and ticket intermodal travel arrangements, such as flights, railways, and/or buses on the GDS primary screens together in one common booking.

== Rail transport ==
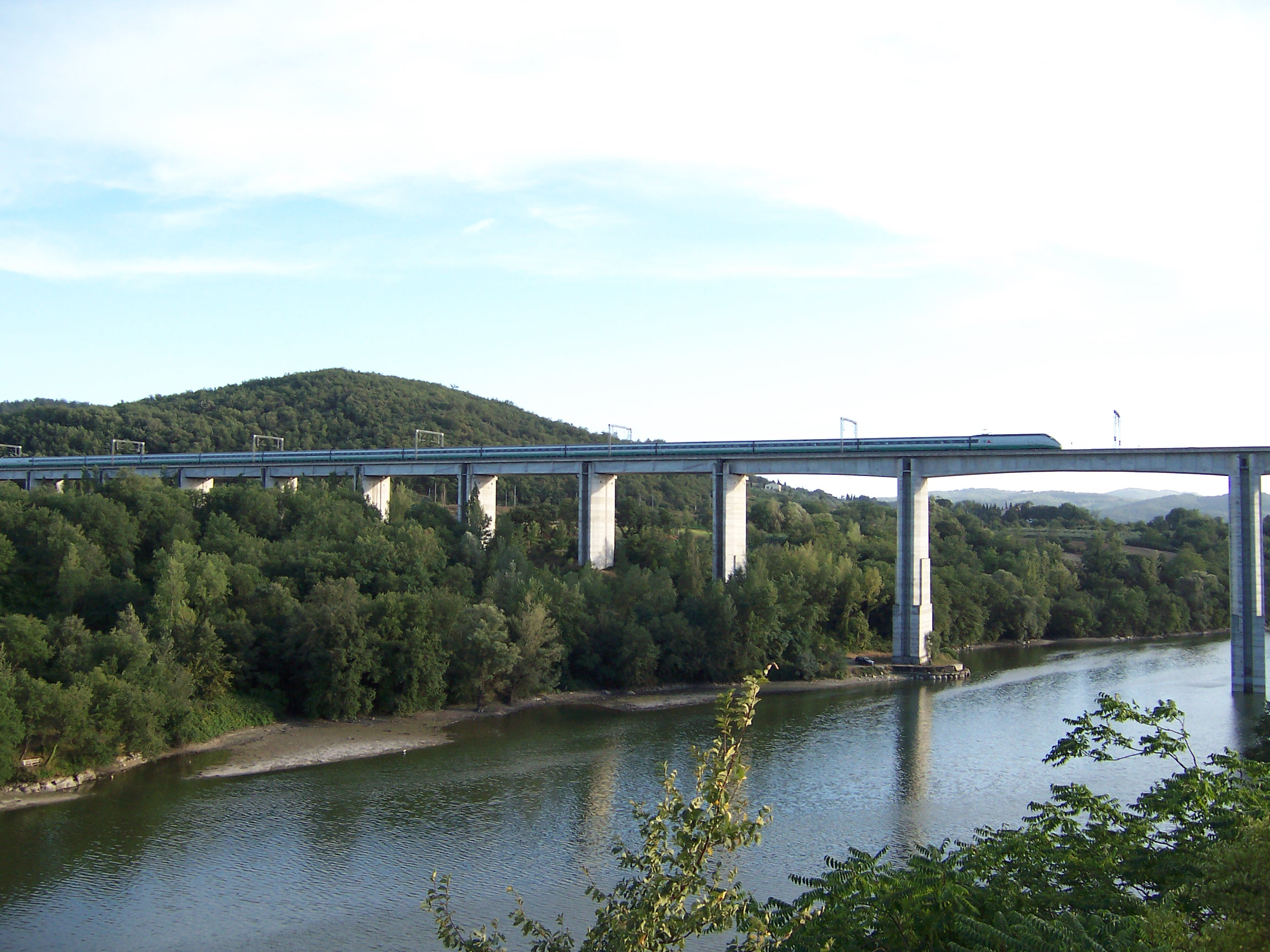
An ETR 500 train running on the Florence–Rome high-speed line near Arezzo, the first high-speed railway opened in Europe

Powered rail transport began in England in the early 19th century with the invention of the speed train. The modern European rail network spans almost the entire continent, with the exception of Andorra, Cyprus, Iceland, Malta, and San Marino. It provides movement of passengers and freight. There are significant high-speed rail passenger networks, such as the TGV in France and the LAV in Spain. The Channel Tunnel connects the United Kingdom with France and thus the whole of the European rail system, and it was called one of the seven wonders of the modern world by the American Society of Civil Engineers. The longest railway tunnel in the world, the Gotthard Base Tunnel, crosses the Alps in Switzerland.

Various method of rail electrification are used as well as much unelectrified track. Multi system locomotives and EMUs allow for cross-border services. Standard gauge is widespread in Central and Western Europe, Russian gauge predominates in parts of Eastern Europe, and mainline services on the Iberian Peninsula and the island of Ireland use the rarer Iberian gauge and Irish gauge, respectively. In mountainous areas, narrow-gauge railways are common. The European Rail Traffic Management System is an EU initiative to create a Europe-wide standard for train signalling.

Rail infrastructure, freight transport and passenger services are provided by a combination of local and national governments and private companies. Passenger ticketing varies from country to country and service to service. The Eurail Pass, a rail pass for 18 European countries, is available only for persons who do not live in Europe, Morocco, Algeria or Tunisia. Interrail passes allow multi-journey travel around Europe for people living in Europe and surrounding countries.

Rail transport in Europe has diverse technological standards, operating concepts, and infrastructures. Common features are the widespread use of standard-gauge rail, high operational safety and a high proportion of electrification. Electrified railway networks in Europe operate at many different voltages, both AC and DC, varying from 750 to 25,000 volts, and signaling systems vary from country to country, complicating cross-border traffic.

The European Union (EU) aims to make cross-border operations easier as well as to introduce competition to national rail networks. EU member states were empowered to separate the provision of transport services and the management of the infrastructure by the Single European Railway Directive 2012. Usually, national railway companies were split into separate divisions or independent companies for infrastructure, passenger and freight operations. The passenger operations may be further divided into long-distance and regional services, because regional services often operate under public service obligations (which maintain services which are not economically interesting to private companies but nonetheless produce societal benefit), while long-distance services usually operate without subsidies.

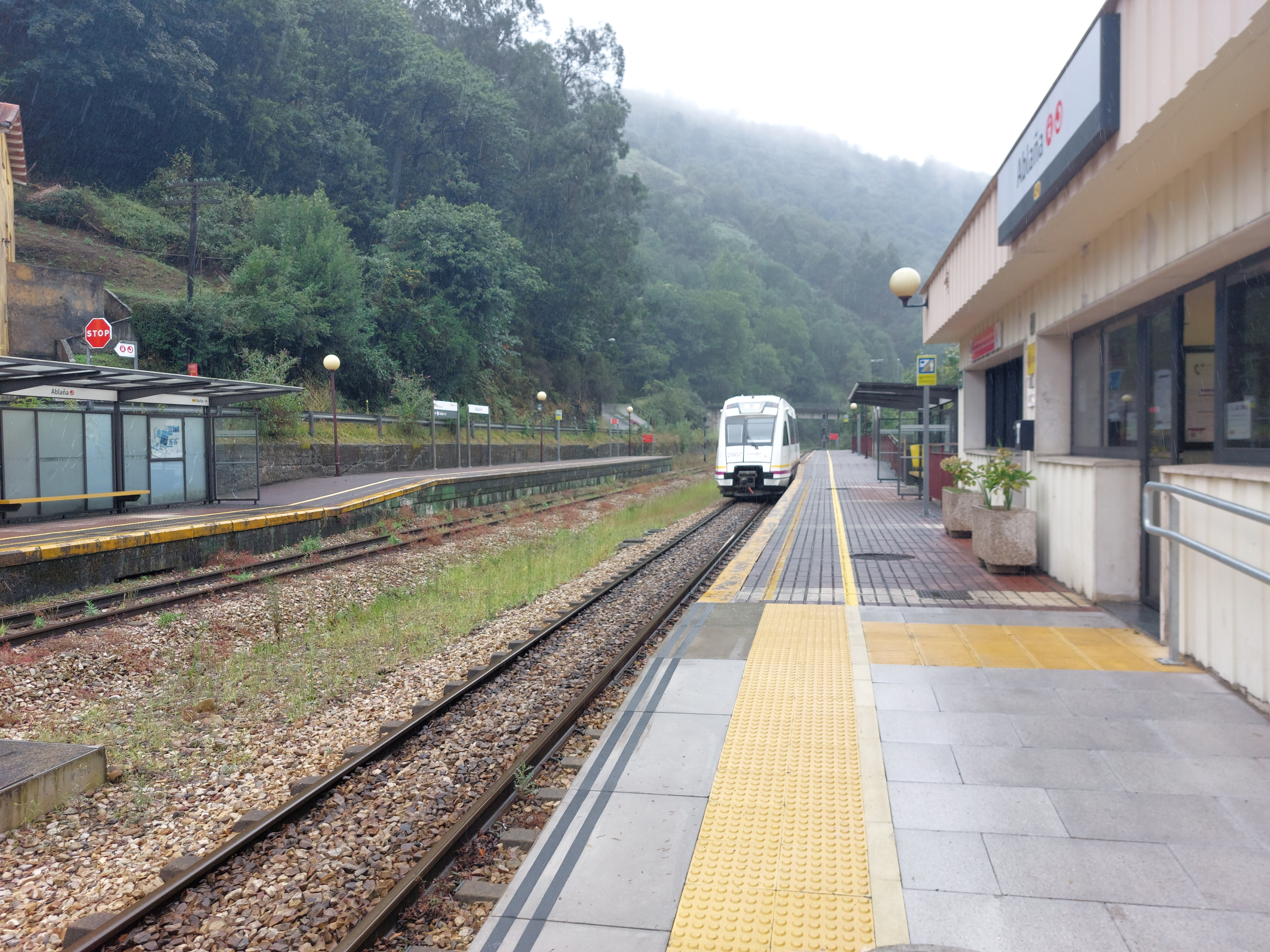
A narrow-gauge train at a station in Spain

Across the EU, passenger rail transport saw a 50% increase between 2021 and 2022, with the 2022 passenger-kilometers figure being slightly under that of 2019 (i.e. before the COVID-19 pandemic). The trend is expected to continue and rapid investments in European Union railways are under way.

Switzerland is the European leader in kilometres traveled by rail per inhabitant and year, followed by Austria and France among EU countries. Switzerland was also ranked first among national European rail systems in the 2017 European Railway Performance Index, followed by Denmark, Finland and Germany.

Nearly all European countries have operational railway lines, the only exceptions being Iceland, Cyprus and the microstates of Andorra (which never had one) and Malta and San Marino (whose single railway lines were either entirely or mostly dismantled). Russia, Germany and France have the longest railway networks in Europe. Apart from the islands of Great Britain, Ireland and Denmark, operational island railways are also present on Corsica, Isle of Man, Mallorca, Sardinia, Sicily and Wangerooge.

Public transport timetables, including rail, are amended yearly, usually on the second Sunday of December and June, respectively. The European Rail Timetable publishes rail schedules for all European countries.

Eurail and Interrail are both rail passes for international rail travel in Europe for tourists.

=== Rapid transit ===
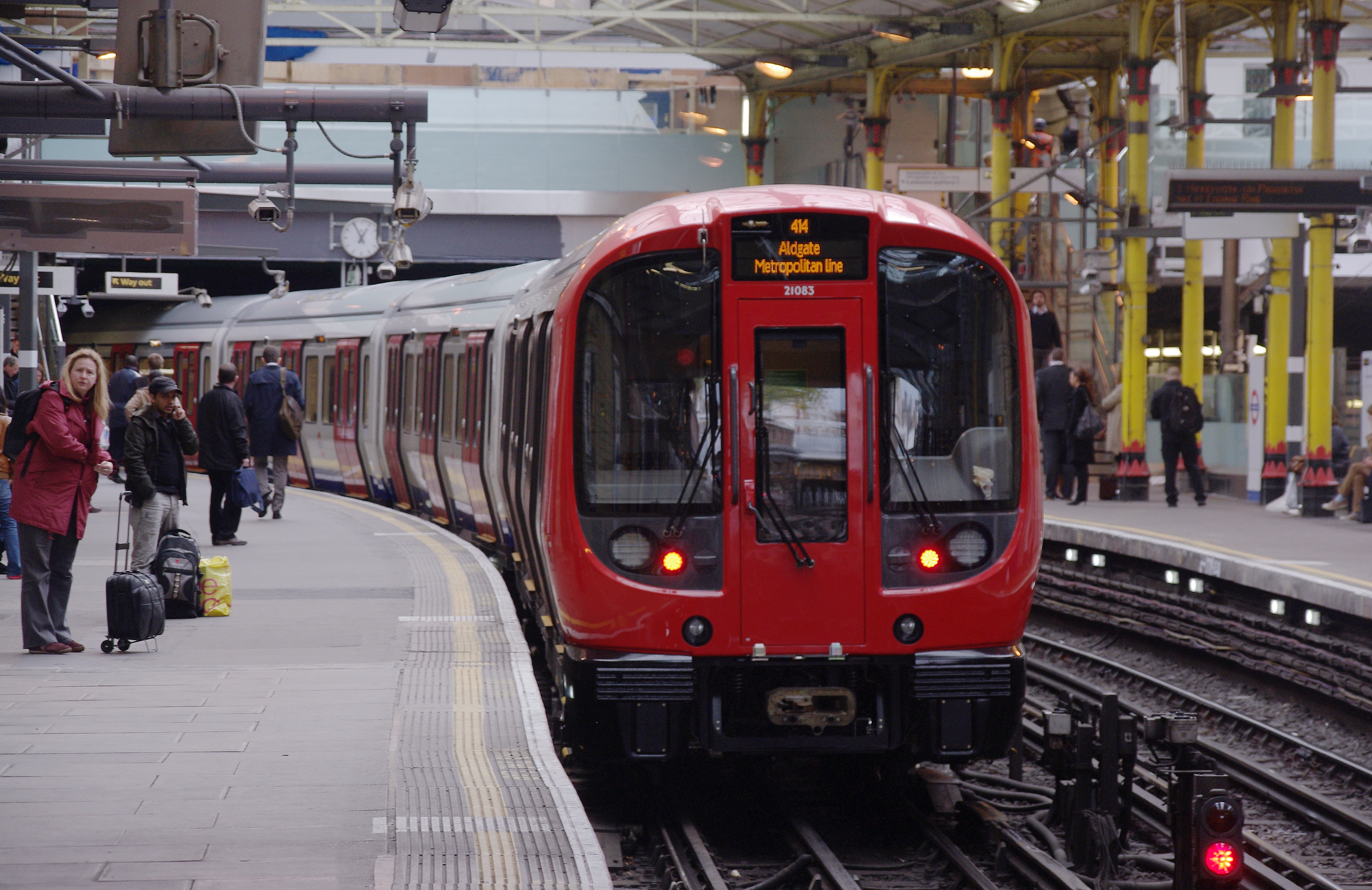
A sub-surface Metropolitan line train (S8 Stock) at Farringdon of the London Underground.

Many cities across Europe have a rapid transit system, commonly referred to as a metro, which is an electric railway. The world's first underground railway, the Metropolitan Railway, was opened in London in 1863. It is now part of London's rapid transit system that referred to as the London Underground, the longest such system in Europe. After London, the largest European metro systems by track length are in Moscow, Madrid and Paris.

== Roads ==
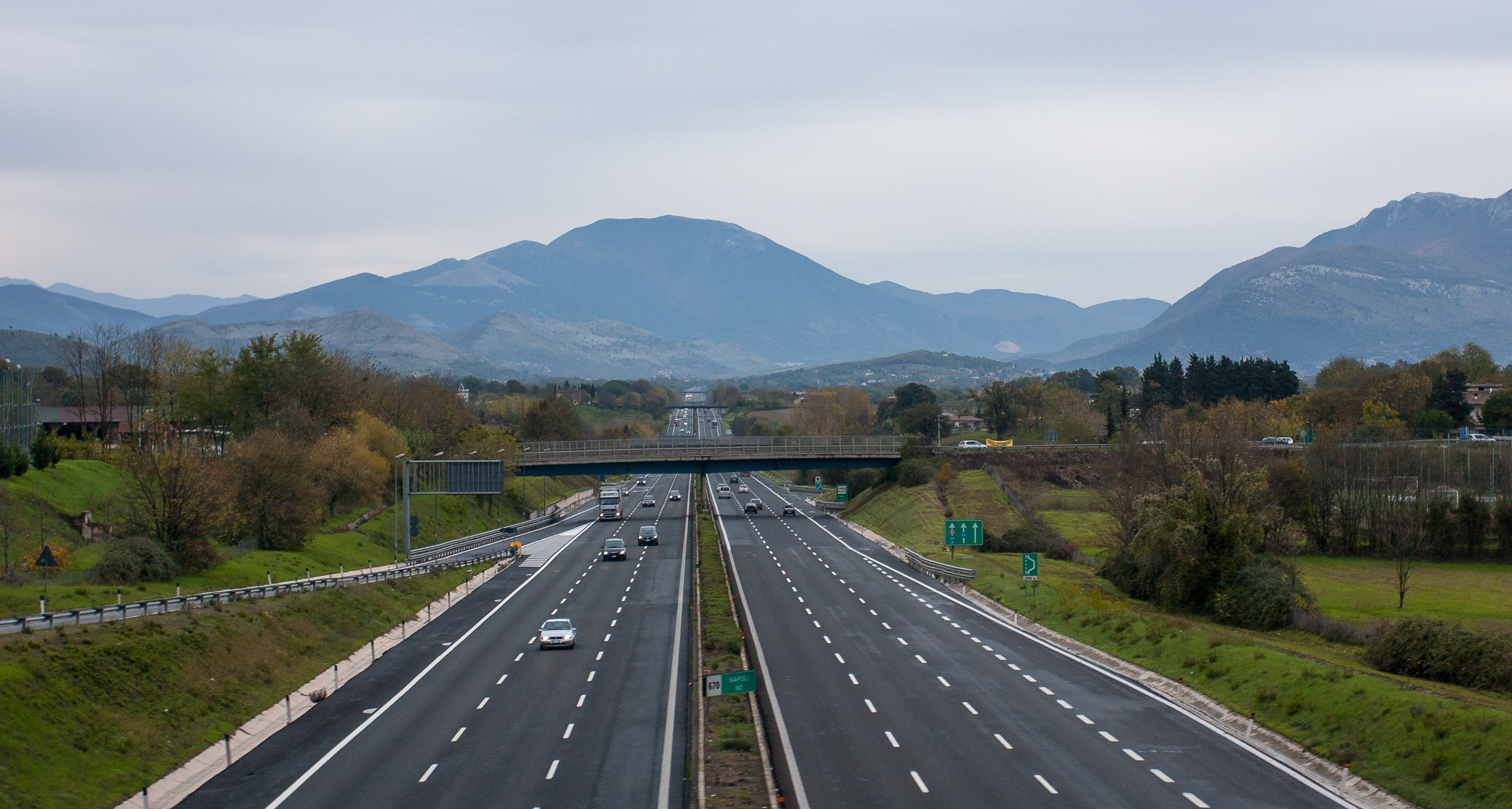
The European route E45 near Cassino, Italy

The International E-road network is a numbering system for roads in Europe developed by the United Nations Economic Commission for Europe (UNECE). The network is numbered from E1 up and its roads cross national borders. It also reaches Central Asian countries like Kyrgyzstan, since they are members of the UNECE.

Main international traffic arteries in Europe are defined by ECE/TRANS/SC.1/2016/3/Rev.1 which consider three types of roads: motorways, limited access roads, and ordinary roads.

In most countries, the roads carry the European route designation alongside national designations. Belgium, Norway and Sweden have roads which only have the European route designations (examples: E18 and E6). The United Kingdom, Albania and the Asian part of Russia only use national road designations and do not show the European designations at all. All route numbers in Andorra are unsigned. Denmark only uses the European designations on signage, but also has formal names for every motorway (or part of such), by which the motorways are referred to, for instance in news and weather forecasts. In Asia, Turkey and Russia show the European designations on signage; this is not the case in many other Asian countries.

Other continents have similar international road networks, e.g., the Pan-American Highway in the Americas, the Trans-African Highway network, and the Asian Highway Network.

UNECE was formed in 1947, and their first major act to improve transport was a joint UN declaration no. 1264, the Declaration on the Construction of Main International Traffic Arteries, signed in Geneva on 16 September 1950, which defined the first E-road network. Originally it was envisaged that the E-road network would be a motorway system comparable to the US Interstate Highway System. The declaration was amended several times until 15 November 1975, when it was replaced by the European Agreement on Main International Traffic Arteries or "AGR", which set up a route numbering system and improved standards for roads in the list. The AGR last went through a major change in 1992 and in 2001 was extended into Central Asia to include the Caucasus nations. There were several minor revisions since, last in 2008 (as of 2009).

== Coach transport ==
In the early 2010s, many countries in Europe decided to liberalize the market for medium/long distance coach (intercity bus) transportation, obliged to do it by the EC directive 1370/2007 (Public Service Obligations in Transport). This move has already proven to be helping both the economies and the Europeans.

The bus is the cheapest method of transportation and slower than the train in countries that have high-speed rail. However, many companies have made adjustments so that their coach fleets can be as comfortable as trains. Toilets and power have been added to the coaches, and some are equipped with WiFi.

== Air transport ==
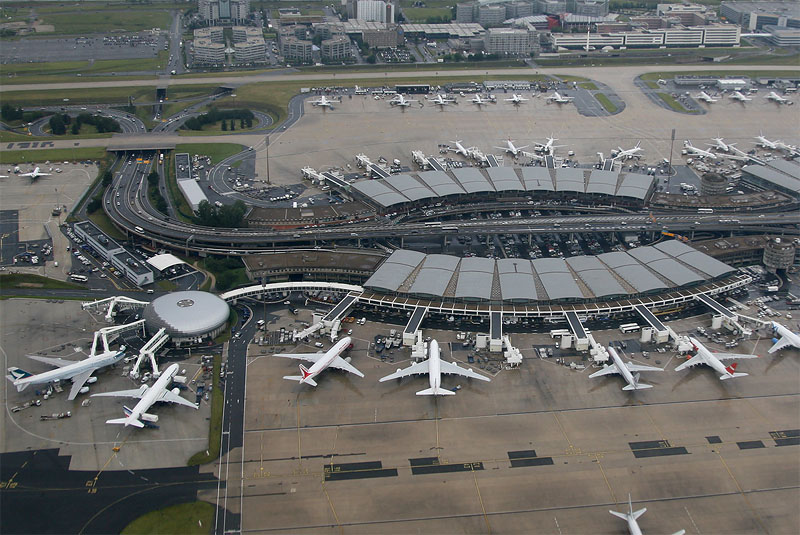
Charles de Gaulle Airport in Paris, France

Despite an extensive road and rail network, 43% of international travel within the EU was by air in 2013. Air travel is particularly important for peripheral nations such as Spain and Greece and island nations such as Malta and Cyprus, where a large majority of border crossings are by air. A large tourism industry also attracts many visitors to Europe, most of whom arrive into one of Europe's many large international airports – major hubs include London Heathrow, Istanbul, Paris-Charles De Gaulle, Frankfurt and Amsterdam Schiphol. The advent of low cost carriers in recent years has led to a large increase in air travel within Europe. Air transportation is now often the cheapest way of travelling between cities. This increase in air travel has led to problems of airspace overcrowding and environmental concerns. The Single European Sky is one initiative aimed at solving these problems.

Within the European Union, the complete freedoms of the air and the world's most extensive cabotage agreements allow budget airlines to operate freely across the EU. Cheap air travel is spurred on by the trend for regional airports levying low fees to market themselves as serving large cities quite far away. Ryanair is especially noted for this, since it primarily flies out of regional airports up to 150 kilometres away from the cities they are said to serve. A primary example of this is the Weeze-Skavsta flight, where Weeze mainly serves the Nijmegen/Kleve area, while Skavsta serves Nyköping/Oxelösund. Ryanair however, markets this flight as Düsseldorf-Stockholm, which are both 80–90 kilometres away from these airports, resulting in up to four hours of ground transportation just to get to and from the airport.

== Sea and river transport ==
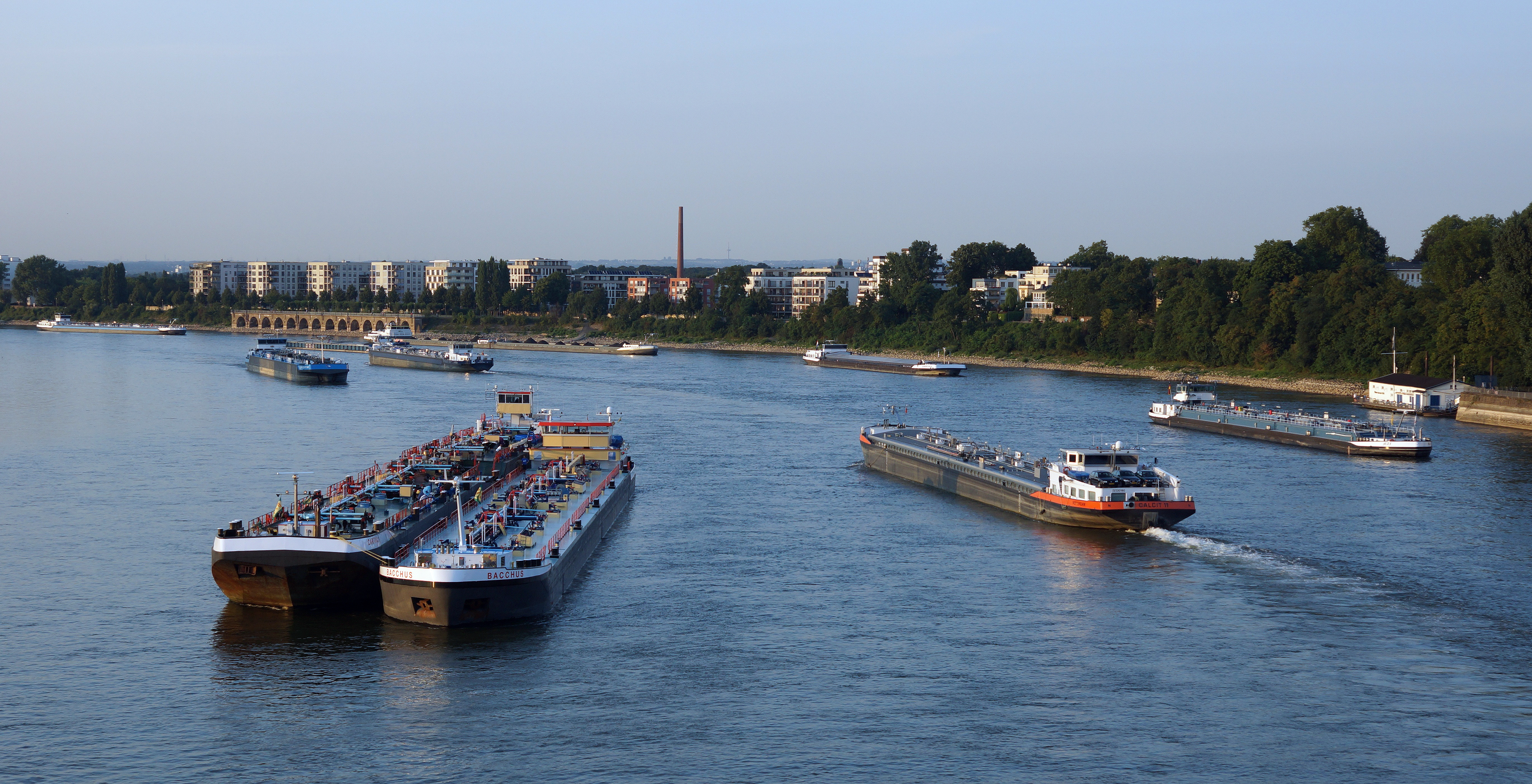
Ships on the Rhine at Cologne.

The Port of Rotterdam, Netherlands is the largest port in Europe and one of the busiest ports in the world, handling some 440 million metric tons of cargo in 2013. When the associated Europoort industrial area is included, Rotterdam is by certain measurements the world's busiest port. Two thirds of all inland water freight shipping within the EU, and 40% of containers, pass through the Netherlands. Other large ports are the Port of Hamburg in Germany and the Port of Antwerp in Belgium. They are all a part of the so-called "Northern Range".

The English Channel is one of the world's busiest seaways carrying over 400 ships per day between Europe's North Sea and Baltic Sea ports and the rest of the world.

As well as its role in freight movement, sea transport is an important part of Europe's energy supply. Europe is one of the world's major oil tanker discharge destinations. Energy is also supplied to Europe by sea in the form of LNG. The South Hook LNG terminal at Milford Haven, Wales is Europe's largest LNG terminal.

The Rhine is an important route for cargo ships, transporting goods from Rotterdam (Netherlands) upstream as far as Basel (Merchant Marine of Switzerland).

== See also ==
- Transport in the European Union
- Directorate-General for Energy and Transport
- Emission standard
- Energy in the European Union
- Environment in the European Union
- European Aviation Safety Agency
- European Car of the Year
- European Climate Change Programme
- European Common Aviation Area
- European Federation for Transport and Environment
- European Organisation for the Safety of Air Navigation (EUROCONTROL)
- European vehicle registration plates
- International E-road network
- Momo car-sharing
- Roadex Project
- Trans-European Networks
- UNECE vehicle standards.
- Jacques Barrot, Vice-President of the European Commission, in charge of transport.
- Southeast Europe Transport Community
