= T&E =

T&E may refer to:

- T+E (TV channel) - Canadian cable network
- European Federation for Transport and Environment
- Trial and error
- Travel & entertainment
