= Japanese cruiser Izumo =

Izumo-Class armored cruizer by Japan

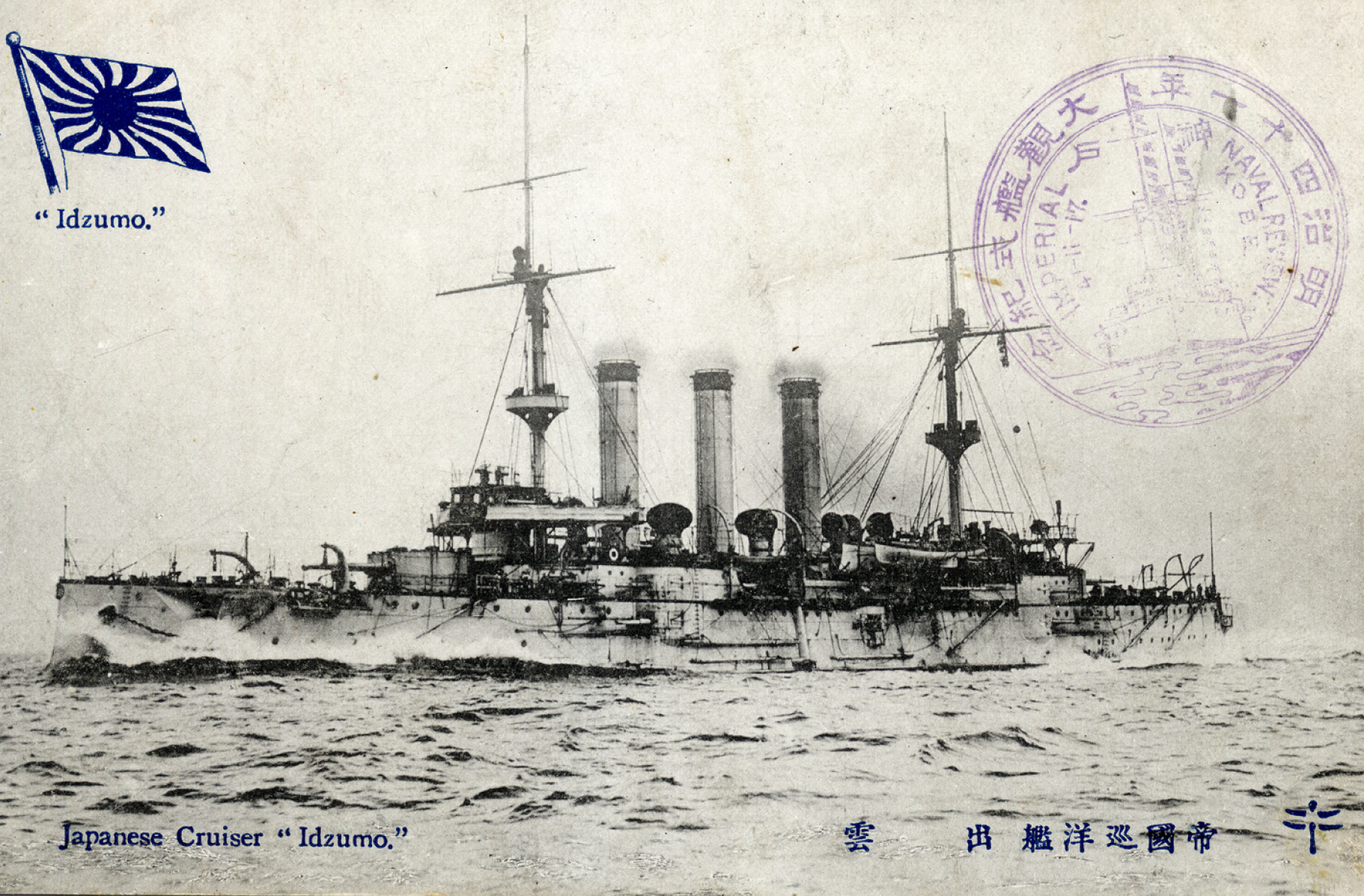
- A Japanese postcard of Izumo at Kobe in 1941

History

Empire of Japan
- Name: Izumo
- Namesake: Izumo Province
- Ordered: 24 September 1897
- Builder: Armstrong Whitworth, United Kingdom
- Laid down: 14 May 1898
- Launched: 19 September 1899
- Completed: 25 September 1900
- Reclassified: As 1st class coast-defense ship, 1 September 1921; As 1st class cruiser, 1 July 1942; As training ship, 1943
- Stricken: 20 November 1945
- Fate: Sunk by air attack, 24 July 1945; Scrapped, 1947

General characteristics
- Class & type: Izumo-class armored cruiser
- Displacement: 9,503 t (9,353 long tons)
- Length: 132.28 m (434 ft 0 in) (o/a)
- Beam: 20.94 m (68 ft 8 in)
- Draft: 7.26 m (23 ft 10 in)
- Installed power: 24 Belleville boilers; 14,500 ihp (10,800 kW)
- Propulsion: 2 shafts; 2 triple-expansion steam engines
- Speed: 20.75 knots (38.43 km/h; 23.88 mph)
- Range: 7,000 nmi (13,000 km; 8,100 mi) at 10 knots (19 km/h; 12 mph)
- Complement: 672
- Armament: 2 × twin 20.3 cm (8 in) guns; 14 × single 6 in (152 mm) guns; 12 × single 12-pdr (3 in (76 mm)) guns; 8 × single 2.5-pdr (3 in (76 mm)) guns; 4 × single 457 mm (18 in) torpedo tubes
- Armor: Waterline belt: 89–178 mm (3.5–7.0 in); Deck: 63 mm (2.5 in); Gun Turret: 160 mm (6.3 in); Barbette: 152 mm (6 in); Casemate: 51–152 mm (2–6 in); Conning tower: 356 mm (14 in); Bulkhead: 127 mm (5 in)

Izumo (出雲; sometimes transliterated Idzumo) was the lead ship of her class of armored cruisers (Sōkō jun'yōkan) built for the Imperial Japanese Navy (IJN) in the late 1890s. As Japan lacked the industrial capacity to build such warships itself, the ship was built in Britain. She often served as a flagship and participated in most of the naval battles of the Russo-Japanese War of 1904–1905. The ship was lightly damaged during the Battle off Ulsan and the Battle of Tsushima. Izumo was ordered to protect Japanese citizens and interests in 1913 during the Mexican Revolution and was still there when World War I began in 1914.

She was then tasked to search for German commerce raiders and protect Allied shipping off the western coasts of North and Central America. The ship assisted the armored cruiser Asama in early 1915 when she struck a rock off Baja California. In 1917, Izumo became the flagship of the Japanese squadron deployed in the Mediterranean Sea. After the war, she sailed to Great Britain to take control of some ex-German submarines and then escorted them part of the way back to Japan.

The ship spent most of the 1920s as a training ship for naval cadets and became flagship of the IJN's China forces in 1932 during the First Shanghai Incident. Izumo participated in the Battle of Shanghai five years later and was not damaged, despite repeated aerial attacks. The ship played a minor role in the Pacific War, supporting Japanese forces during Philippines Campaign until she struck a mine. She returned to Japan in 1943 and again became a training ship for naval cadets. Izumo was sunk by American carrier aircraft during the attack on Kure in July 1945. Her wreck was refloated and scrapped in 1947.

== Background and description ==
The 1896 Naval Expansion Plan was made after the First Sino-Japanese War and included four armored cruisers in addition to four more battleships, all of which had to be ordered from British shipyards as Japan lacked the capability to build them itself. Further consideration of the Russian building program caused the IJN to believe that the battleships ordered under the original plan would not be sufficient to counter the Imperial Russian Navy. Budgetary limitations prevented ordering more battleships and the IJN decided to expand the number of more affordable armored cruisers to be ordered from four to six ships. The revised plan is commonly known as the "Six-Six Fleet". Unlike most of their contemporaries which were designed for commerce raiding or to defend colonies and trade routes, Izumo and her half-sisters were intended as fleet scouts and to be employed in the battleline.

The ship was 132.28 meters (434 ft) long overall and 121.92 meters (400 ft) between perpendiculars. She had a beam of 20.94 meters (68 ft 8 in) and had an average draft of 7.26 meters (23 ft 10 in). Izumo displaced 9,503 metric tons (9,353 long tons) at normal load and 10,305 metric tons (10,142 long tons) at deep load. The ship had a metacentric height of 0.88 meters (2 ft 11 in). Her crew consisted of 672 officers and enlisted men.

Izumo had two 4-cylinder triple-expansion steam engines, each driving a single propeller shaft. Steam for the engines was provided by 24 Belleville boilers and the engines were rated at a total of 14,500 indicated horsepower (10,800 kW). The ship had a designed speed of 20.75 knots (38.43 km/h; 23.88 mph) and reached 21.74 knots (40.26 km/h; 25.02 mph) during her sea trials from 16,078 ihp (11,989 kW). She carried up to 1,527 long tons (1,551 t) of coal and could steam for 7,000 nautical miles (13,000 km; 8,100 mi) at a speed of 10 knots (19 km/h; 12 mph).

The main armament for all of the "Six-Six Fleet" armored cruisers was four eight-inch guns in twin-gun turrets fore and aft of the superstructure. The secondary armament consisted of 14 Elswick Ordnance Company "Pattern Z" quick-firing (QF), 6-inch (152 mm) guns. Only four of these guns were not mounted in armored casemates on the main and upper decks and their mounts on the upper deck were protected by gun shields. Izumo was also equipped with a dozen QF 12-pounder 12-cwt guns (Note: "Cwt" is the abbreviation for hundredweight, 12 cwt referring to the weight of the gun.) and eight QF 2.5-pounder Yamauchi guns as close-range defense against torpedo boats. The ship was equipped with four submerged 457 mm (18 in) torpedo tubes, two on each broadside.

All of the "Six-Six Fleet" armored cruisers used the same armor scheme with some minor differences. The waterline belt of Krupp cemented armor ran the full length of the ship and its thickness varied from 178 millimeters (7 in) amidships to 89 millimeters (3.5 in) at the bow and stern. It had a height of 2.13 meters (7 ft), of which 1.39 meters (4 ft 7 in) was normally underwater. The upper strake of belt armor was 127 millimeters (5 in) thick and extended from the upper edge of the waterline belt to the main deck. It extended 51.18 meters (167 ft 11 in) from the forward to the rear barbette. The Izumo class had oblique 127 mm armored bulkheads that closed off the ends of the central armored citadel.

The barbettes, gun turrets and the front of the casemates were all 6 inches thick while the sides and rear of the casemates were protected by 51 millimeters (2 in) of armor. The deck was 63 millimeters (2.5 in) thick and the armor protecting the conning tower was 356 millimeters (14 in) in thickness.

== Construction and career ==
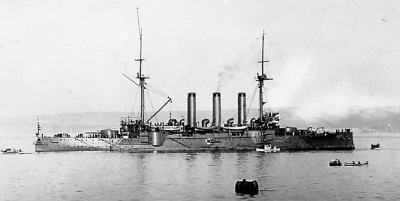
Izumo at anchor in 1902

The contract for Izumo, named after the eponymous province, was signed on 24 September 1897 with Armstrong Whitworth. The ship was laid down at their shipyard in Elswick on 14 May 1899 and launched on 19 September. She was completed on 25 September 1900 and departed for Japan on 2 October under the command of Captain Inoue Toshio, who had been appointed to supervise her construction and bring her back to Japan on 29 September 1899. Izumo arrived in Yokosuka on 8 December and Inoue was confirmed in his command.

=== Russo-Japanese War ===
At the start of the Russo-Japanese War, Izumo, now under the command of Captain Miyaoka Naoki, was the flagship of Vice Admiral Kamimura Hikonojō, commander of the 2nd Fleet. She participated in the Battle of Port Arthur on 9 February 1904, when Vice Admiral Tōgō Heihachirō led the Combined Fleet in an attack on the Russian ships of the Pacific Squadron anchored just outside Port Arthur. Tōgō had expected the surprise night attack by his destroyers to be much more successful than it was, anticipating that the Russians would be badly disorganized and weakened, but they had recovered from their surprise and were ready for his attack. The Japanese ships were spotted by the protected cruiser Boyarin, which was patrolling offshore and alerted the Russians. Tōgō chose to attack the Russian coastal defenses with his main armament and engage the ships with his secondary guns. Splitting his fire proved to be a poor decision as the Japanese eight- and six-inch guns inflicted little damage on the Russian ships, which concentrated all their fire on the Japanese ships with some effect. Although many ships on both sides were hit, Russian casualties numbered some 150, while the Japanese suffered roughly 90 killed and wounded before Tōgō disengaged.

In early March, Kamimura was tasked to take the reinforced 2nd Division north and make a diversion off Vladivostok. While scouting for Russian ships in the area, the Japanese cruisers bombarded the harbor and defenses of Vladivostok on 6 March to little effect. Upon their return to Japan a few days later, the 2nd Division was ordered to escort the transports ferrying the Imperial Guards Division to Korea and then to join the ships blockading Port Arthur. Kamimura was ordered north in mid-April to cover the Sea of Japan and defend the Korea Strait against any attempt by the Vladivostok Independent Cruiser Squadron, under the command of Rear Admiral Karl Jessen, to break through and unite with the Pacific Squadron. The two units narrowly missed each other on the 24th in heavy fog and the Japanese proceeded to Vladivostok where they laid several minefields before arriving back at Wonsan on the 30th.

The division failed to intercept the Russian squadron as it attacked several transports south of Okinoshima Island on 15 June due to heavy rain and fog. The Russians sortied again on 30 June and Kamimura finally was able to intercept them the next day near Okinoshima. The light was failing when they were spotted and the Russians were able to disengage in the darkness. Jessen's ships sortied again on 17 July headed for the eastern coast of Japan to act as a diversion and pull Japanese forces out of the Sea of Japan and the Yellow Sea. The Russian ships passed through Tsugaru Strait two days later and began capturing ships bound for Japan. The arrival of the Russians off Tokyo Bay on the 24th caused the Naval General Staff to order Kamimura to sail for Cape Toi Misaki, Kyūshū, fearing that Jessen would circumnavigate Japan to reach Port Arthur. Two days later he was ordered north to the Kii Channel and then to Tokyo Bay on the 28th. The General Staff finally ordered him back to Tsushima Island on the 30th; later that day he received word that Jessen's ships had passed through the Tsugaru Strait early that morning and reached Vladivostok on 1 August.

==== Battle off Ulsan ====
On 10 August, the ships at Port Arthur attempted a breakout to Vladivostok, but were turned back in the Battle of the Yellow Sea. Jessen was ordered to rendezvous with them, but the order was delayed. His three armored cruisers, Rossia, Gromoboi, and Rurik, had to raise steam, so he did not sortie until the evening of 13 August. By dawn he had reached Tsushima, but turned back when he failed to see any ships from the Port Arthur squadron. 36 miles (58 km) north of the island he encountered Kamimura's squadron, which consisted of four modern armored cruisers, Iwate, Tokiwa, Azuma, and Izumo. The two squadrons had passed during the night without spotting one another and each had reversed course around first light. This put the Japanese ships astride the Russian route to Vladivostok.

Jessen ordered his ships to turn to the northeast when he spotted the Japanese at 05:00 and they followed suit, albeit on a slightly converging course. Both sides opened fire around 05:23 at a range of 8,500 meters (9,300 yd). The Japanese ships concentrated their fire on Rurik, the rear ship of the Russian formation. She was hit fairly quickly and began to fall astern of the other two ships. Jessen turned southeast in an attempt to open the range, but this blinded the Russian gunners with the rising sun and prevented any of their broadside guns from bearing on the Japanese. About 06:00, Jessen turned 180° to starboard in an attempt to reach the Korean coast and to allow Rurik to rejoin the squadron. Kamimura followed suit around 06:10, but turned to port, which opened the range between the squadrons. Azuma then developed engine problems and the Japanese squadron slowed to conform with her best speed. Firing recommenced at 06:24 and Rurik was hit three times in the stern, flooding her steering compartment; she had to be steered with her engines. Her speed continued to decrease, further exposing her to Japanese fire, and her steering jammed to port around 06:40.

Jessen made another 180° turn in an attempt to interpose his two ships between the Japanese and Rurik, but the latter ship suddenly turn to starboard and increased speed and passed between Jessen's ships and the Japanese. Kamimura turned 180° as well so that both squadrons were heading southeast on parallel courses, but Jessen quickly made another 180° turn so that they headed on opposing courses. The Russians reversed course for the third time around 07:45 in another attempt to support Rurik although Rossia was on fire herself; her fires were extinguished about twenty minutes later. Kamimura circled Rurik to the south at 08:00 and allowed the other two Russian ships to get to his north and gave them an uncontested route to Vladivostok. Despite this, Jessen turned back once more at 08:15 and ordered Rurik to make her own way back to Vladivostok before turning north at his maximum speed, about 18 knots (33 km/h; 21 mph).

About this time Kamimura's two elderly protected cruisers, Naniwa and Takachiho, were approaching from the south. Their arrival allowed Kamimura to pursue Jessen with all of his armored cruisers while the two new arrivals dealt with Rurik. They fought a running battle with the Russians for the next hour and a half; scoring enough hits on them to force their speed down to 15 knots (28 km/h; 17 mph). The Japanese closed to a minimum of about 5,000 meters (5,500 yd), but Kamimura then opened the range up to 6,500 meters (7,100 yd).

About 10:00, Kamimura's gunnery officer erroneously informed him that Izumo had expended three-quarters of her ammunition and he turned back after a five-minute rapid-fire barrage. He did not wish to leave the Tsushima Strait unguarded and thought that he could use his remaining ammunition on Rurik. By this time she had been sunk by Naniwa and Takachiho. They had radioed Kamimura that she was sunk, but he did not receive the message. Shortly after the Japanese turned back, Gromoboi and Rossia were forced to heave-to to make repairs. None of the Japanese ships were seriously damaged; despite Izumo receiving over 20 hits, she only suffered 3 men killed and 16 wounded during the battle. She began repairs at Sasebo Naval Arsenal in mid-September.

On 26 January 1905, Kamimura hoisted his flag again in Izumo at Sasebo and then escorted several troop convoys to Wonsan on February. On 13 April, the 2nd Division, including the armored cruisers Tokiwa and Kasuga, sailed to escort minelayers as they laid 715 mines off Vladivostok.

==== Battle of Tsushima ====
As the Russian 2nd and 3rd Pacific Squadrons approached Japan on 27 May, having sailed from the Baltic Sea, they were spotted by patrolling Japanese ships early that morning, but visibility was limited and radio reception poor. The preliminary reports were enough to cause Tōgō to order his ships to put to sea and the 2nd Division spotted the Russian ships under the command of Vice Admiral Zinovy Rozhestvensky at around 11:30. Kamimura closed to about a range of 8,000 meters (8,700 yd) before sheering off under fire to join Tōgō's battleships. Izumo was leading the 2nd Division when Tōgō opened fire on the 2nd Pacific Squadron at 14:10 and, like most of the ships in the division, engaged the battleship Oslyabya which was forced to fall out of formation at 14:50 and sank 20 minutes later. By this time the Russian formation was in disorder and Knyaz Suvorov suddenly appeared out of the mist at 15:35 at a range of about 2,000 meters (6,600 ft). All of Kamimura's ships engaged her for five minutes or so with Azuma and the armored cruiser Yakumo also firing torpedoes at the Russian ship without effect.

After 17:30 Kamimura led his division in a fruitless pursuit of some of the Russian cruisers, leaving Tōgō's battleships to their own devices. He abandoned his chase around 18:03 and turned northwards to rejoin Tōgō. His ships spotted the rear of the Russian battleline around 18:30 and opened fire when the range closed to 8,000–9,000 meters (8,700–9,800 yd). Nothing is known of any effect on the Russians and they ceased fire by 19:30 and rejoined Tōgō at 20:08 as night was falling. The surviving Russian ships were spotted the next morning and the Japanese ships opened fire around 10:30, staying beyond the range at which the Russian ships could effectively reply. Rear Admiral Nikolai Nebogatov therefore decided to surrender his ships as he could neither return fire nor close the range. Over the course of the battle, Izumo was struck by five large shells, mostly 12-inch, and three smaller shells, mostly 6-inch. They caused only minor damage, although one 12-inch shell, which pierced a boiler uptake, could have disabled all of the middle boilers had it detonated. The shells killed 4 men and wounded 26 others.

As the IJN was preparing to invade Sakhalin Island in early July, Kamimura's 2nd Division, now reduced to Iwate, Izumo, and Tokiwa, was tasked to defend the Korea Strait before it escorted troops that made an amphibious landing in northeastern Korea. In mid-August, the division covered the landing at Chongjin, closer to the Russian border.

On 20 September 1909, under command of Captain Takeshita Isamu, Izumo departed Yokohama for the United States to participate in the Portola Festival at San Francisco, a citywide fair held on 19–23 October to mark the 140th anniversary of the Portolà expedition, the first recorded Spanish (and European) land entry and exploration of present-day California, and to proclaim to the world that San Francisco was recovered from its devastating 1906 earthquake. Lieutenant Prince Shimazu Tadashige was assigned to the ship during this visit. Lieutenant Allen B. Reed, engineering officer on the USS Albany (CL-23) and the future commissioning captain of the heavy cruiser USS New Orleans (CA-32) was assigned as Captain Takeshita's escort during the ship's visit at San Francisco. Izumo made port calls in Hawaii, Monterrey, Santa Barbara, and San Diego en route. On 12 November 1913, Izumo was ordered to patrol the west coast of Mexico to safeguard Japanese interests and nationals during the Mexican Revolution.

=== World War I ===
When Japan declared war on the Central Powers in August 1914, Izumo was still off the Mexican coast and was ordered to protect Allied shipping there and search for German commerce raiders. On 1 November, the ship, then off San Francisco, was ordered to join a British task force commanded by Admiral Sir George Patey off San Clemente Island that included the battlecruiser Australia and the light cruiser Newcastle. After the German gunboat SMS Geier was interned by the Americans on 8 November, the ex-Russian battleship Hizen and Asama, which had been patrolling off Honolulu, Hawaii, to prevent the German ship from leaving, rendezvoused with the other ships of the American Expeditionary Squadron at Magdalena Bay, Baja California on 22 November. The squadron, now commanded by Rear Admiral Moriyama Keizaburo in Izumo, then headed south to search along the western coast of South America for German ships. On 11 December, after the receiving the news of the British victory in the Battle of the Falkland Islands, the squadron moved north to search off the western coast of Central America and then Mexican and U.S. waters in January.

During a patrol off the coast of Oregon, the Izumo picked up an SOS from the steam schooner Francis H. Leggett, but did not provide aid due to the presence of a German cruiser nearby. The Leggett later sank, with only 2 survivors out of 62 on board.

While searching Baja California, Asama was badly damaged when she struck an uncharted rock on 31 January. Izumo, delayed by poor communications, arrived on 12 February and Moriyama radioed for repair and salvage ships to be sent from Japan. Izumo was relieved by Tokiwa on 19 March and the ship returned home.

Izumo relieved the protected cruiser Akashi in June 1917 at Malta as the flagship of Rear Admiral Kōzō Satō, commander of the Second Special Mission Squadron that controlled the Japanese destroyers that escorted convoys in the Mediterranean Sea. In December 1918, Izumo, accompanied by the destroyers Hinoki and Yanagi, sailed from Malta to Scapa Flow to assume control of seven captured German U-boats as prizes of war. They returned to Malta with the U-boats in March 1919 and the armored cruiser Nisshin accompanied eight destroyers and the U-boats to Japan, while Izumo made port calls at Naples, Genoa and Marseille before arriving in Japan with the remaining destroyers on 2 July 1919.

=== Interwar years ===
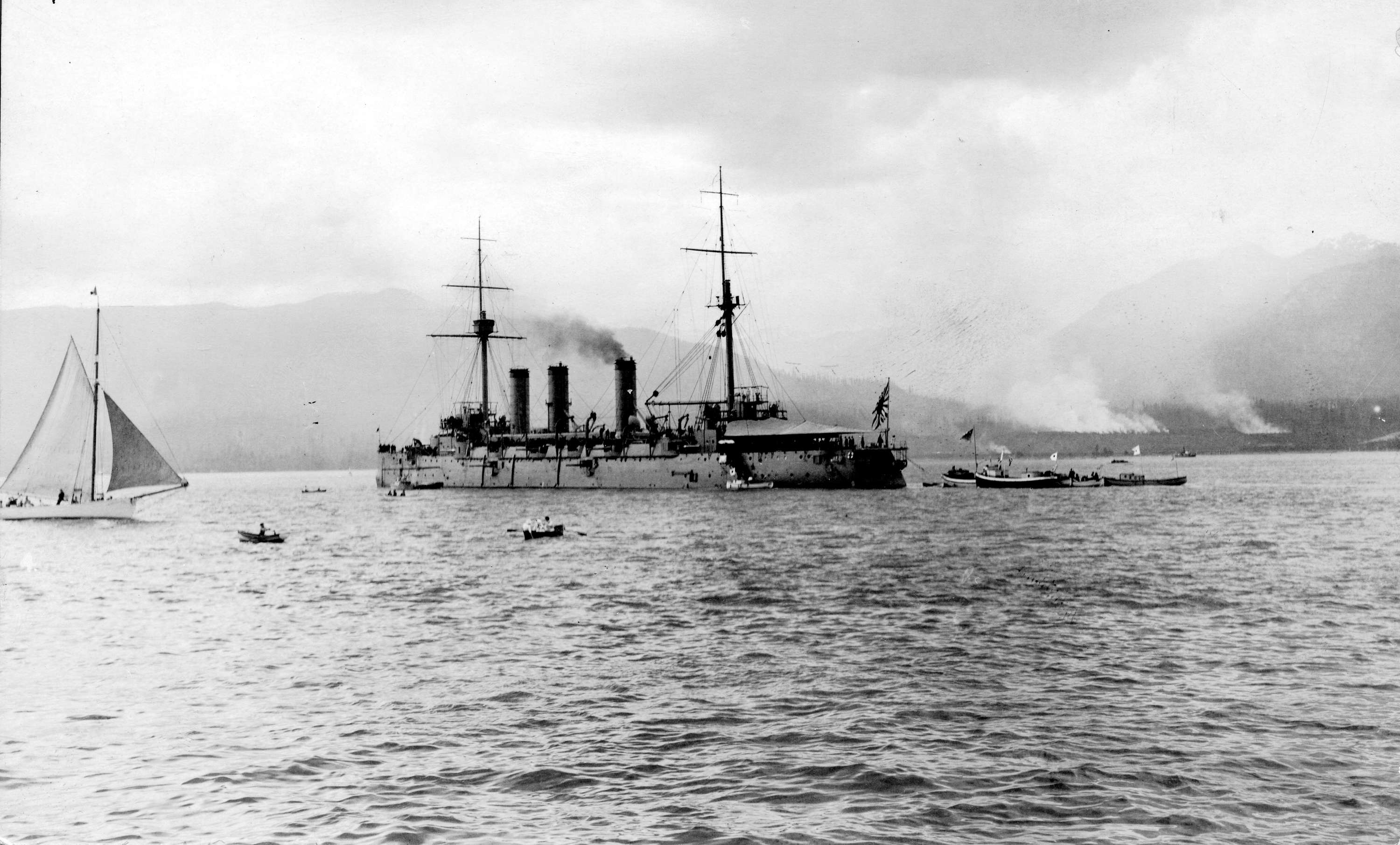
Izumo at anchor in Vancouver, 1925

Izumo participated in the 1919 Naval Review by Emperor Taishō. She was re-designated a 1st class coast-defense ship on 1 September 1921 and used primarily for training duties in long-distance oceanic navigation and officer training for cadets in the Imperial Japanese Navy Academy. In this capacity, she participated six voyages in the 1920s and 1930s to Europe, North and South America, and Oceania, including a circumnavigation of the globe from August 1921 to April 1922 with Yakumo. Two of the naval cadets that participated in this cruise were Princes Kuni Asaakira and Kachō Hirotada. While in Vancouver, British Columbia, on 7 February 1925, on one of these cruises, a tugboat collided with one of the ship's boats at night, drowning 11 crewmen.

In 1924, four of Izumo's 12-pounder guns were removed, as were all of her QF 2.5-pounder guns, and a single 8 cm/40 3rd Year Type anti-aircraft (AA) gun was added. Refitted again in 1930–31, her torpedo tubes were removed as were all of her main deck 6-inch guns and their casemates plated over; she now carried only four 12-pounders. In 1935 her boilers were replaced by six Kampon water-tube boilers with an output of only 7,000 ihp (5,200 kW) which reduced her top speed to 16 knots (30 km/h; 18 mph). She now carried 1,428 metric tons (1,405 long tons) of coal and 329 metric tons (324 long tons) of fuel oil which increased her deep displacement to 10,864 metric tons (10,692 long tons).

=== China service and World War II ===
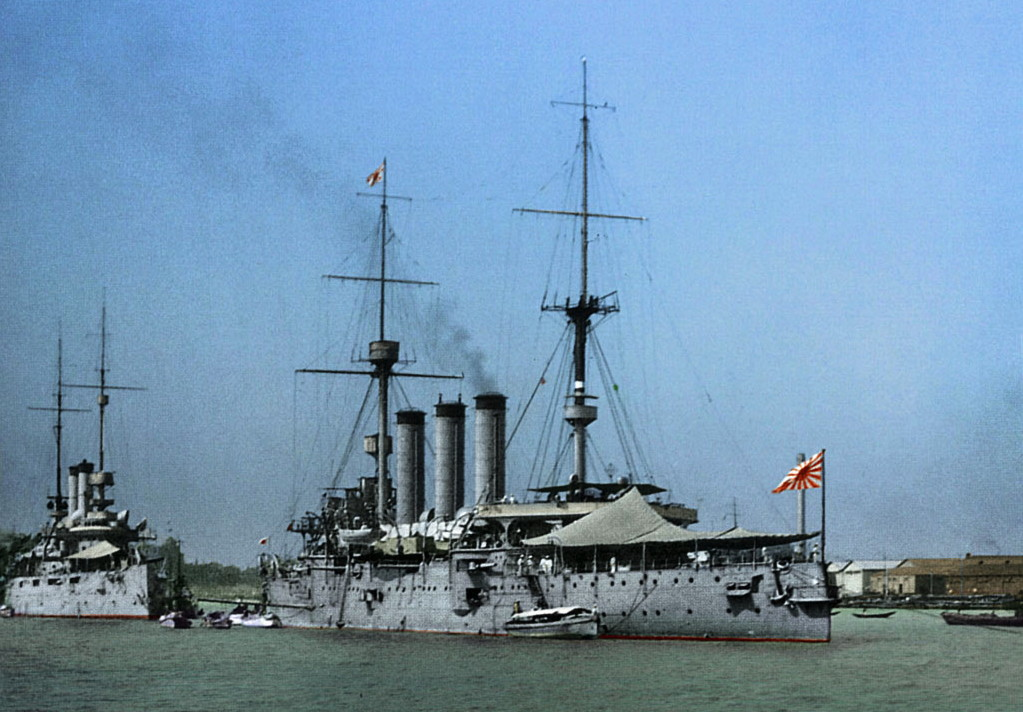
Izumo at anchor in the Huangpu River, Shanghai, 1932. The armored cruiser USS Rochester is anchored to the left.

On 2 February 1932, during the First Shanghai Incident, Izumo became the flagship of the newly re-established 3rd Fleet under Admiral Kichisaburō Nomura and arrived in Shanghai six days later. In 1934, Izumo was equipped to operate a floatplane at the Sasebo Naval Arsenal.

Shortly after the beginning of the Second Sino-Japanese War in July 1937, Izumo was attacked on 14 August 1937 in a series of raids by Chinese Air Force aircraft during the Battle of Shanghai. Most of the bombs landed in the river without effect, but two bombs landed among spectators, killing hundreds. Izumo's Nakajima E4N floatplane and another from the light cruiser Sendai managed to get into the air and they claimed to have shot down one Curtiss Hawk biplane fighter and a Northrop Gamma bomber. Two days later, her E4N claimed to have shot down another Hawk. Izumo was attacked that same day by a Chinese torpedo boat, but the torpedoes missed and the boat was abandoned by its crew. The ship provided naval gunfire support to Japanese troops ashore during the battle. Izumo was repeatedly attacked without effect by Chinese aircraft for the duration of the Battle of Shanghai.

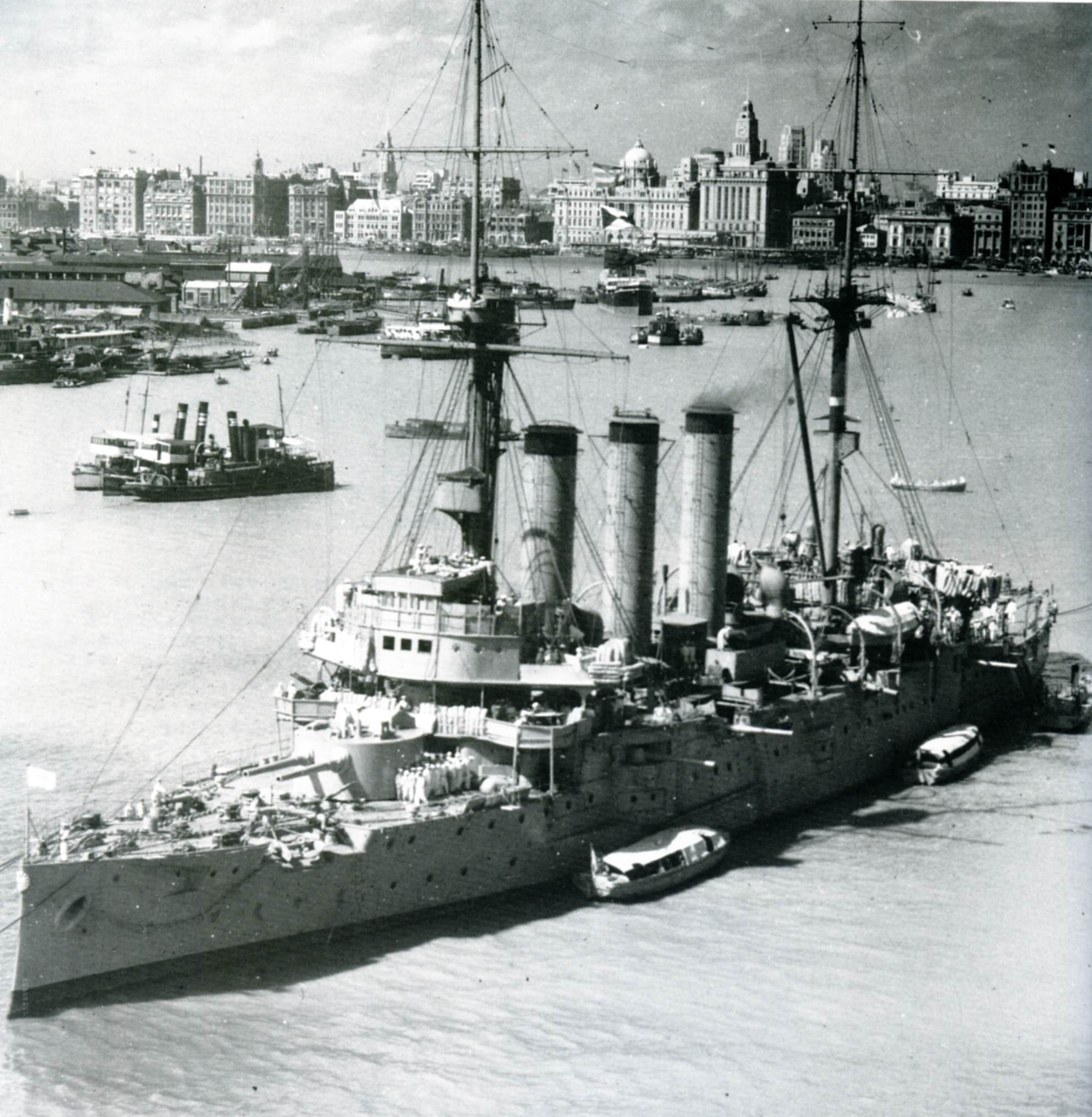
Izumo in Shanghai, 1937

Still in Shanghai at the beginning of the Pacific War on 8 December 1941, Izumo captured the American river gunboat USS Wake and assisted in sinking the British river gunboat HMS Peterel. On 31 December, the cruiser struck a mine in Lingayen Gulf while supporting Japanese forces during the Philippines Campaign. She was towed to Hong Kong in February 1942 for repairs. Izumo was re-classified as a 1st-class cruiser on 1 July. She returned to Japan in late 1943 and was reclassified as a training ship for the Kure Naval District.

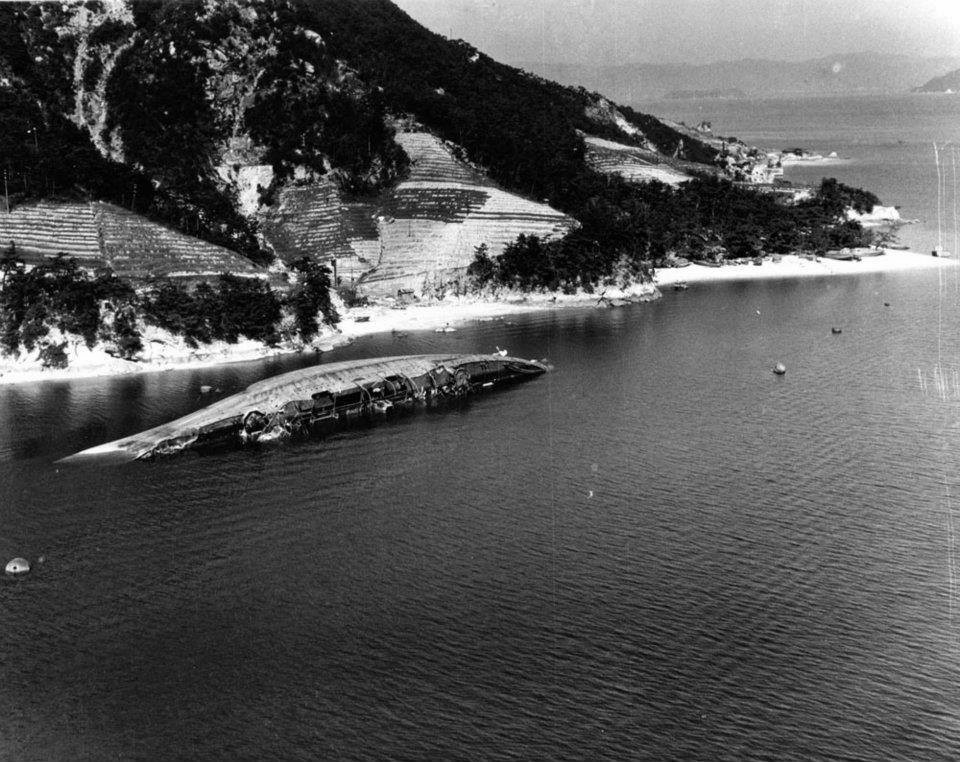
The wreck of Izumo, sunk after the attack on Kure.

On 19 March 1945, Izumo was attacked by American carrier aircraft off Etajima, although they failed to inflict any damage. Shortly afterwards, her 8-inch guns were replaced by four 12.7 cm (5.0 in) Type 89 dual-purpose guns in two twin mounts and four of her remaining 6-inch guns were removed. Her light anti-aircraft armament was significantly reinforced by the addition of 14 license-built Hotchkiss 25-millimeter Type 96 light AA guns in two triple, two twin, and four single-gun mounts and two 13.2-millimeter Hotchkiss machine guns in single mounts. The ship was damaged by an American mine on 9 April off Hiroshima. Izumo was not attacked on the first day of the American aerial attack on Kure on 24 July 1945, but she was near missed three times four days later. The shockwave from the detonations sprang the ship's seams and the resulting flooding caused her to capsize at coordinates 34°14′N 132°30′E. She was removed from the navy list on 20 November and her hulk was raised and scrapped in 1947 by the Harima Dock Company.
