= Manchukuo River Defence Fleet =

River Defence Fleet
- Jiangfang Jiandui
- Active: 15 February 1932 – 20 August 1945
- Country: Manchukuo
- Branch: Manchukuo Imperial Navy
- Type: Fleet

Commanders
- Lieutenant general: Yin Zuoqian
- General: Li Wenlong
- General: Xian Yuan
- General: Cao Bingsen

The Manchukuo River Defence Fleet was formed from the Chinese Songha River Fleet after it surrendered to Japan on 15 February 1932. The fleet when formed was made up of five river gunboats, the Lisui, Liji, Jiangqing, Jiangping, and the Jiangtong. The Japanese later reinforced it with four more gunboats, the Shuntian, Yangmin, Dingbian, Qinren, Datong, Limin, Xichun, Yangchun, Xingya, and the Xingren, along with eighteen patrol boats, several supply vessels and three marine battalions, and supplied 2000 men in 1940. Almost all of the officers and some of the ratings came from the Imperial Japanese Navy.

== History ==
=== Political history ===
In February 1939, the Japanese navy ceased to have political influence over Manchukuo, and many of its naval instructors were forced to withdraw. After this, the River Defence Fleet was renamed the Jiang Shangjun (River Army). Its new commander from Manchukuo, Yin Zuoqian, was promoted to lieutenant general, he was succeeded by Li Wenlong (March 1941 – September 1942), Xian Yuan (September 1942 – March 1944) and Cao Bingsen (March 1944 – August 1945).

=== Operation history ===
The River Defence Fleet was made out of the remainder of the Chinese Songha River Fleet on 15 of February, 1932, after it surrendered to Japan. It originally held five gunboats, the Lisui, Liji, Jiangqing, Jiangping, and the Jiangtong. But the Japanese later chose to reinforce it with the Shuntian, Yangmin, Dingbian, Qinren, Datong, Limin, Xichun, Yangchun, Xingya, and the Xingren. The Imperial Japanese Navy also choose to supply their own officers, and ratings.

The River Defence Fleet was primarily used to ensure Japanese control of the river, and to support the army against the Chinese rebels, along with defending the border with the USSR in the Songhua, Heilongjiang (Amur) and Wusuli (Ussuri) rivers. The fleet was involved in several border skirmishes, such as the dispute of the Ganchazi (in Japanese) or Bolshoi (in Russian) island, over the period of 19–30 June 1937, in which they managed to sink a Soviet gunboat. They also served in the skirmish of Donganzhen on 27 May 1939, where they lost one patrol boat and had another one captured from them by the Soviets. They were also involved in the skirmish of Xingkai Lake, in May 1942, in which two Soviet airplanes strafed two Manchukuo patrol boats.

In 1942 many of the remaining Japanese sailors left the River Defence Fleet and rejoined the Imperial Japanese Navy, severely limiting the Defence Fleet's operation efficiency. On 9 August 1945, Manchukuo was invaded by the Soviets. The crew of four gunboats and three patrol boats mutinied and surrendered to the Soviets or the Chinese. What was left of the fleet was captured by the Soviets after they seized Harbin on 20 August 1945.
