= Manchukuo Imperial Navy =

1932–1945 navy of Japan's puppet state Manchukuo

- Naval Ensign and War Flag of the Manchukuo Imperial Navy
- Active: 15 April 1932 – August 1945
- Country: Manchukuo
- Branch: Manchukuo Imperial Armed Forces
- Type: Navy
- Role: Coastal and river defense

Commanders
- Commander in Chief: Emperor Pu Yi

The Manchukuo Imperial Navy (Chinese: 江上軍; pinyin: Jiāngshàng Jūn) was the navy of the Japanese puppet state of Manchukuo.

As the southern part of the Liaodong Peninsula was ruled by Japan as the Kwantung Leased Territory, leaving Manchukuo with very little coastline, the leadership of the Japanese Kwantung Army regarded the development of a Manchukuo navy to have a very low military priority, although it was politically desirable to create at least a nominal force as a symbol of the legitimacy of the new regime.

== History ==
When the Imperial Japanese Army invaded Manchuria in 1931, they were accompanied by a detachment from the Imperial Japanese Navy (IJN), which provided for coastal defense. However, the main naval requirement for Manchuria was the defense of its extensive border river system with the Soviet Union. Immediately after the Manchurian Incident of 1931, Kuomintang Northeastern Navy Vice-Minister Shen Honglie and Fleet Commander Xian Gongzhe deserted their posts. Local Kuomintang commander Captain Yin Zuqian met with Japanese forces and agreed to turn over his fleet of five river gunboats to the Imperial Japanese Navy in Harbin on 15 February 1932. This flotilla formed the core of the Sungari River Defense Fleet (Chinese: 江防艦隊) under the State of Manchuria.

The Manchukuo Imperial Navy was established on 15 April 1932, by the proclamation of the "Manchukuoan Armed Forces Act" by Emperor Pu Yi, who also assumed the role of supreme commander. The flagship of the fleet was the destroyer Hai Wei, formerly the Kashi, a Momo-class destroyer of the Imperial Japanese Navy. However, coastal defense for Manchukuo remained largely in the hands of the IJN 3rd China (North) Fleet.

The Sungari Fleet was active on the Sungari, Amur and Ussuri rivers from 1933, and received additional gunboats from Japan. However, it proved hopelessly inadequate during the Pacification of Manchukuo, and the Japanese instituted numerous training programs in an attempt to raise its capabilities. Reserve or retired Japanese officers were assigned to the Sungari Fleet, and Manchukuo cadets were sent to study navigation and gunnery at the Imperial Japanese Navy Academy.

In November 1938, IJN units were withdrawn from Manchukuo, ostensibly because the training levels of the Imperial Manchukuo Navy had risen to acceptable levels, but in reality because of the ongoing political conflict between the Japanese army and navy over who had control over Manchuria. In November 1939 the navy came under the control of the Manchukuo Imperial Army, and was renamed River Force (Chinese: 江上軍).

In 1942, most of the remaining Japanese personnel serving with the River Force were also withdrawn. As half of its officer class was Japanese, this left a huge gap in capabilities and the performance of the River Force deteriorated rapidly. Many ships became inoperable, and their anti-aircraft guns were demounted and used in land-based operations. At the time of the Soviet invasion of Manchuria, the River Force was completely unready for combat, and disintegrated in face of the overwhelmingly superior Soviet forces.

== Manchukuo Navy Main Flotilla ==
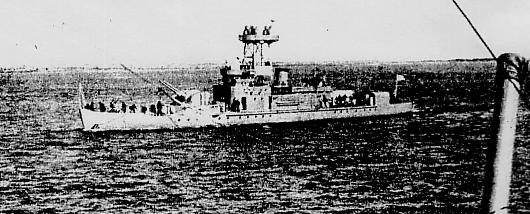
Manchukuo Imperial Navy ship

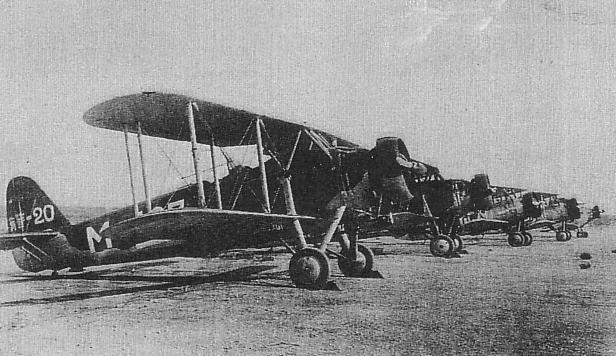
Aichi D1A of the Manchukuo Imperial Navy

=== Coastal Defense Forces ===
- HQ: Yingkou Naval Base, Fengtian
- Secondary Base: Hulutao Naval Base, Fengtian
  - Flagship: DD Hai Wei
- 2nd Patrol Division (Sea)
  - YP Hai Lung
  - YP Hai Feng
  - YP Li Sui
  - YP Lin Chi
- 3 Patrol Division (Sea)
  - YP Kuan Ning
  - YP Kuan Ching
  - YP Chian Tung
- 4 Patrol Division (Sea)
  - YP Hai Kuang
  - YP Hai Jui
  - YP Hai Jung
  - YP Hai Hua
- 5 Patrol Division (Sea)
  - YP Daichii
  - YP Kaihen
  - YP Kaini
  - YP Ta Tung
  - YP Li Ming

=== Manchukuo Navy River Defense Patrol ===
- Yingkou and Dandong Base, Fengtian
- 1st Patrol Division (Sungari River)
  - PR Ting Pien
  - PR Ching Hen
  - PR Shun Tien
  - PR Yan Ming
- The Sungari River Fleet operated armored cars on the frozen rivers during wintertime, when their gunboats could not be deployed.

== Manchukuo Imperial Navy land units ==
The Manchu Imperial Navy land units were formed from Japanese and Manchu crews, together with Manchukuo security naval police. They were charged with watching ports and naval bases, and guarding dams. Organized into two units of 500 men each, they were armed with light weapons and machine guns.

== See also ==
- Military ranks of Manchukuo
