= Military ranks of Manchukuo =

The military ranks of Manchukuo were the military insignia used by the Manchukuo Imperial Army, the Manchukuo Imperial Navy, and the Manchukuo Imperial Air Force during its existence, from its founding in 1932 until the Soviet invasion in 1945.

== Corps colours ==
Colour	Branch
Black	Military police
Red	Infantry
Green	Cavalry
Yellow	Artillery
Brown	Engineers
Blue	Transport corps

== Commissioned officer ranks ==
The rank insignia of commissioned officers.

Rank group	General / flag officers				Senior officers			Junior officers
Chinese	總司令	上将	中将	少将	上校	中校	少校	上尉	中尉	少尉	准尉
Pinyin	Zǒngsīlìng	Shàngjiàng	Zhōngjiàng	Shàojiàng	Shàngxiào	Zhōngxiào	Shàoxiào	Shàngwèi	Zhōngwèi	Shàowèi	Zhǔnwèi
Literal translation	Overall control command	Upper commander	Middle commander	Lower commander	Senior field officer	Middle field officer	Junior field officer	Upper officer	Middle officer	Lower officer	Allow officer
Manchukuo Imperial Army (1932)
Manchukuo Imperial Army (1935)
Manchukuo Imperial Navy
Rank	總司令; Zǒngsīlìng	上将; Shàngjiàng	中将; Zhōngjiàng	少将; Shàojiàng	上校; Shàngxiào	中校; Zhōngxiào	少校; Shàoxiào	上尉; Shàngwèi	中尉; Zhōngwèi	少尉; Shàowèi	准尉; Zhǔnwèi
Rank group	General / flag officers				Senior officers			Junior officers

=== Commander title ===
Particularly distinguished three-star generals in Manchukuo could be awarded the title of Commander (Chinese: 將軍), akin to the rank of Marshal in Imperial Japan.

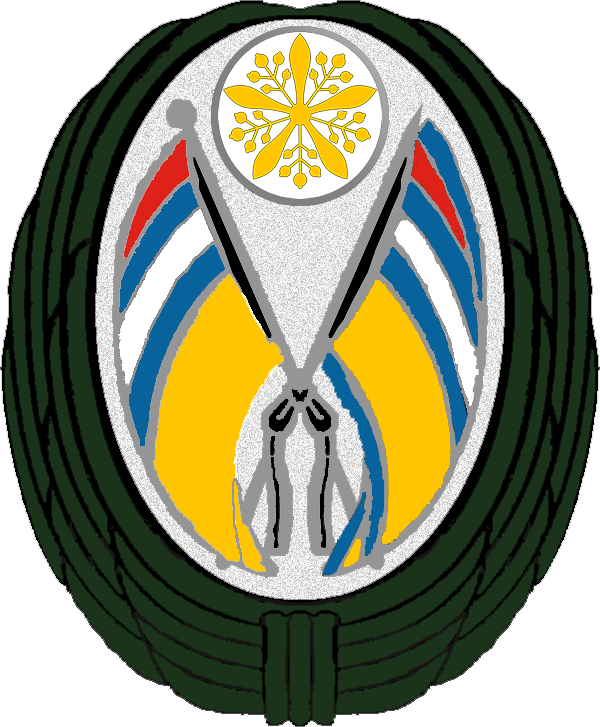
Badge of a Manchukuo Commander

=== Rank flags ===
Rank group	General/flag officers
Manchukuo Imperial Navy
Manchukuo Imperial Navy	上将; Shàngjiàng	中将; Zhōngjiàng	少将; Shàojiàng

== Other ranks ==
The rank insignia of non-commissioned officers and enlisted personnel.

Rank group	NCO's			Enlisted
Rank	上士; Shàngshì	中士; Zhōngshì	少士; Shǎoshì	上兵; Shàngbīng	中兵; Zhōngbīng	少兵; Shǎobīng
Manchukuo Imperial Army
Manchukuo Imperial Navy
Rank	上士; Shàngshì	中士; Zhōngshì	少士; Shǎoshì	上兵; Shàngbīng	中兵; Zhōngbīng	少兵; Shǎobīng
Rank group	NCO's			Enlisted
