= Japanese destroyer Kashi (1916) =

Destroyer of the Imperial Japanese Navy

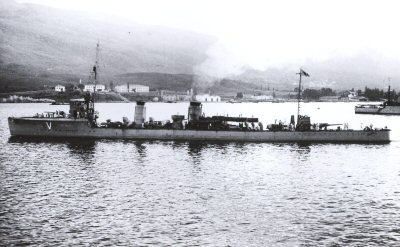
- A Momo-class destroyer, possibly Kashi

History

Empire of Japan
- Name: Kashi (樫)
- Namesake: Evergreen Oak Tree
- Builder: Maizuru Naval Arsenal
- Launched: 1 December 1916
- Completed: 31 March 1917
- Fate: Transferred to Manchukuo Imperial Navy, 1 May 1937

History

Manchukuo
- Name: Hai Wei
- Acquired: 1 May 1937
- Fate: Transferred back to Japan

History

Empire of Japan
- Name: Kaii
- Acquired: 6 June 1942
- Fate: Sunk by aircraft, 10 October 1944

General characteristics
- Class & type: Momo-class destroyer
- Displacement: 835 long tons (848 t) (normal); 1,080 long tons (1,100 t) (full load)
- Length: 275 ft (83.8 m) (pp); 281 ft 8 in (85.9 m) (waterline)
- Beam: 25 ft 5 in (7.7 m)
- Draught: 7 ft 9 in (2.4 m)
- Installed power: 4 water-tube boilers; 16,000 shp (12,000 kW)
- Propulsion: 2 shafts; 2 steam turbines
- Speed: 31.5 knots (58.3 km/h; 36.2 mph)
- Range: 2,400 nmi (4,400 km; 2,800 mi) at 15 knots (28 km/h; 17 mph)
- Complement: 110
- Armament: 3 × single 12 cm (4.7 in) guns; 2 × triple 450 mm (17.7 in) torpedo tubes

Kashi was one of four Momo-class destroyers built for the Imperial Japanese Navy (IJN) during World War I. The ship was transferred to the Imperial Manchukuo Navy in 1937, but was returned to the IJN five years later.

== Design and description ==
The Momo-class destroyers were enlarged and faster versions of the preceding Kaba class with a more powerful armament. They displaced 835 long tons (848 t) at normal load and 1,080 long tons (1,100 t) at deep load. The ships had a length between perpendiculars of 275 feet (83.8 m) and a waterline length of 281 feet 8 inches (85.9 m), a beam of 25 feet 4 inches (7.7 m) and a draught of 7 feet 9 inches (2.4 m). The Momos were powered by two Brown-Curtis geared steam turbines, each driving one shaft using steam produced by four Kampon water-tube boilers. Two boilers burned a mixture of coal and fuel oil while the other pair only used oil. The engines produced a total of 16,000 shaft horsepower (12,000 kW) that gave the ships a maximum speed of 31.5 knots (58.3 km/h; 36.2 mph). They carried enough fuel to give them a range of 2,400 nautical miles (4,400 km; 2,800 mi) at a speed of 15 knots (28 km/h; 17 mph). Their crew consisted of 110 officers and ratings.

The main armament of the Momo-class ships consisted of three quick-firing (QF) 12-centimetre (4.7 in) guns; one gun each was located at the bow and stern with the third gun positioned between the funnels. Their torpedo armament consisted of two triple rotating mounts for 450-millimetre (17.7 in) torpedoes located fore and aft of the funnels.

== Construction and career ==
Kashi was launched on 1 December 1916 at the Sasebo Naval Arsenal and completed on 31 March 1917. The ship played a minor role in World War I and participated in the 1937 Battle of Shanghai that began the Second Sino-Japanese War.

Kashi was transferred to the Manchukuo Imperial Navy on 1 May 1937 and was renamed Hai Wei (Chinese: 海威; pinyin: Hǎi Wēi).

On 6 June 1942, Hai Wei was transferred back to the IJN, and reclassified as the auxiliary escort Kaii. The ship was sunk by United States Navy aircraft off Okinawa on 10 October 1944.

== Bibliography ==
- Friedman, Norman (1985). "Japan". In Gardiner, Robert & Gray, Randal (eds.). Conway's All the World's Fighting Ships 1906–1921. Annapolis: Naval Institute Press. ISBN 0-87021-907-3.
- Friedman, Norman (2011). Naval Weapons of World War One. Barnsley, South Yorkshire, UK: Seaforth. ISBN 978-1-84832-100-7.
- Jentschura, Hansgeorg; Jung, Dieter & Mickel, Peter (1977). Warships of the Imperial Japanese Navy, 1869–1945. Annapolis, Maryland: United States Naval Institute. ISBN 0-87021-893-X.
- Todaka, Kazushige; Fukui, Shizuo; Eldridge, Robert D. & Leonard, Graham B. (2020). Destroyers: Selected Photos from the Archives of the Kure Maritime Museum; the Best from the Collection of Shizuo Fukui's Photos of Japanese Warships. Japanese Naval Warship Photo Album. Annapolis, Maryland: Naval Institute Press. ISBN 978-1-59114-630-8.
- Watts, Anthony J. & Gordon, Brian G. (1971). The Imperial Japanese Navy. London: Macdonald. ISBN 0-35603-045-8.
