= European Federation for Transport and Environment =

European umbrella for non-governmental organisations

Transport & Environment
- Type: NGO
- Legal status: Federation
- Headquarters: Brussels, Belgium
- Executive Director: William Todts
- President: Arie Bleijenberg
- Vice-President: Marcin Korolec
- Website: www.transportenvironment.org

The European Federation for Transport and Environment, commonly referred to as Transport & Environment (T&E), is a European umbrella for non-governmental organisations working in the field of transport and the environment, promoting sustainable transport in Europe.

Transport & Environment has often worked with other environmental lobby groups such as Greenpeace, where many of its staff members have previously worked.

== Main campaign areas ==
- Air pollution
- Aviation
- Better trade and regulation
- Biofuels
- Cars and CO_{2}
- Cleaner, safer trucks
- Dieselgate: Testing reform
- Dirty oil
- Effort sharing regulation
- EU Transport Policy
- Rail
- Shipping
- Vans
- Vehicle noise

== Members ==
T&E is currently supported by 73 organisations (63 members and 10 supporters) in 24 countries.

== Funding ==
Transport & Environment receives funding from: European Climate Foundation, The Norwegian Agency for Development Cooperation, Climate Imperative Foundation, the European Commission, ClimateWorks Foundation, Schwab Charitable Fund, Oak Foundation and a number of other institutions and organisations.

== See also ==
- European emission standards
- Transport in Europe
