= Momo (Brazilian singer) =

MOMO.
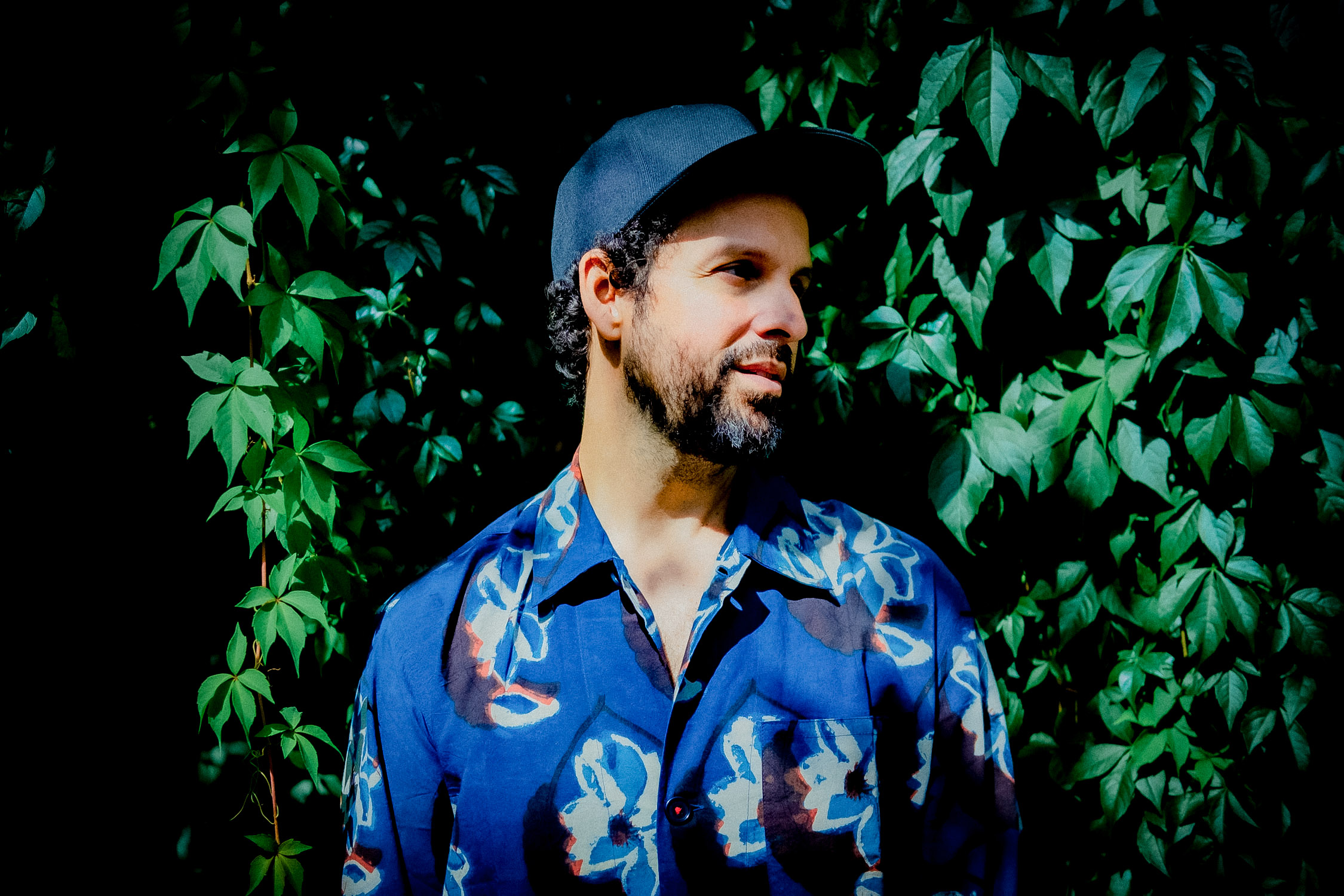

Background information
- Occupations: Vocals, Guitar, Bass, Multi Instrumentalist
- Years active: 2002-Present

Marcelo Elisio Vianna Frota (born 17 February 1979), also known as Momo, is a Brazilian singer-songwriter, composer, multi-instrumentalist, and producer. He began his career in 1998. He was part of the first formation of the band Fino Coletivo, in 2005, but left the group in 2008.

== Early life and education ==
Momo holds a bachelor's degree in journalism and is currently pursuing a master's degree in Designing Audio Experiences: Art, Science in London, where he currently resides.

== Career ==
Momo first gained prominence in the Brazilian music scene in the early 2000s as a co-founder of the band Fino Coletivo, alongside artists such as Wado. His debut solo album, A Estética do Rabisco (2006), was followed by a series of releases that showcased his evolution as an artist. The album was named one of the best albums of the year by The Chicago Reader.

In 2015, Momo relocated to Lisbon, Portugal, where he recorded his fifth album Voá, produced by Marcelo Camelo of Los Hermanos. The album featured collaborations with fado singer Camané, and was well received by the press in both Brazil and Portugal.

In 2019, Momo recorded I Was Told to Be Quiet in Los Angeles at the studio of Grammy-winning producer Tom Biller (Warpaint, Fiona Apple, Kanye West). The album showcased multilingual lyrics (in English, Portuguese, and French), subtle electronic textures.

His seventh album, Gira (2024), recorded at the Total Refreshment Centre in East London, featured collaborations with British jazz musicians and Alabaster DePlume, with whom Momo toured Europe in 2022.

== Discography ==
=== Studio albums ===
- A Estética do Rabisco
- Buscador
- Serenade of a Sailor
- Cadafalso
- I Was Told to Be Quiet
- Voá
- Gira (2024)

=== EPs ===
- Sail your Boat into my Sea (2025)
