= Momo Blamo =

Liberian footballer

Personal information
- Full name: Momo Blamo
- Date of birth: 2 January 1974 (age 52)
- Place of birth: Liberia
- Position: Goalkeeper

Team information
- Current team: Kon Sava FC
- Number: 1

Senior career*
Years	Team	Apps	(Gls)
1986–1987	Saint Joseph Warriors		
1987–1992	Mighty Barolle		
1992–1995	NITEL Vasco Da Gama F.C.		
1995–1997	Eagle Royale Casamba F.C.		
1997–2000	Royal Thai Army FC		
2000–2003	Young Star FC		
2006	Kon Sava FC		

International career
1996–2006	Liberia		
- * Club domestic league appearances and goals as of 13:42, 13 December 2007 (UTC)

Momo Blamo (born 2 January 1974) is a Liberian former footballer who played as a goalkeeper for the Liberia national football team.
