= Japanese destroyer Momo (1916) =

Japanese Destroyer Momo

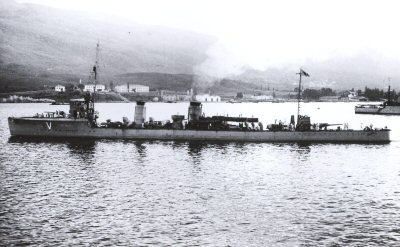
- A Momo-class destroyer, possibly Kashi

History

Empire of Japan
- Name: Momo
- Namesake: "Peach"
- Builder: Sasebo Naval Arsenal, Japan
- Launched: 12 October 1916
- Completed: 23 December 1916
- Decommissioned: 1 April 1940
- Fate: Scrapped, 1940

General characteristics
- Class & type: Momo-class destroyer
- Displacement: 835 long tons (848 t) (normal); 1,080 long tons (1,100 t) (full load)
- Length: 275 ft (83.8 m) (pp); 281 ft 8 in (85.9 m) (waterline)
- Beam: 25 ft 5 in (7.7 m)
- Draught: 7 ft 9 in (2.4 m)
- Installed power: 4 water-tube boilers; 16,000 shp (12,000 kW)
- Propulsion: 2 shafts; 2 steam turbines
- Speed: 31.5 knots (58.3 km/h; 36.2 mph)
- Range: 2,400 nmi (4,400 km; 2,800 mi) at 15 knots (28 km/h; 17 mph)
- Complement: 110
- Armament: 3 × single 12 cm (4.7 in) guns; 2 × triple 450 mm (17.7 in) torpedo tubes

Momo was the lead ship of her class of four destroyers built for the Imperial Japanese Navy during World War I. Completed in 1916, the ship was sent to the Mediterranean Sea where she served as a convoy escort. Momo was decommissioned on 1 April 1940 and subsequently scrapped.

== Design and description ==
The Momo-class destroyers were enlarged and faster versions of the preceding Kaba class with a more powerful armament. They displaced 835 long tons (848 t) at normal load and 1,080 long tons (1,100 t) at deep load. The ships had a length between perpendiculars of 275 feet (83.8 m) and a waterline length of 281 feet 8 inches (85.9 m), a beam of 25 feet 4 inches (7.7 m) and a draught of 7 feet 9 inches (2.4 m). The Momos were powered by two Brown-Curtis geared steam turbines, each driving one shaft using steam produced by four Kampon water-tube boilers. Two boilers burned a mixture of coal and fuel oil while the other pair only used oil. The engines produced a total of 16,000 shaft horsepower (12,000 kW) that gave the ships a maximum speed of 31.5 knots (58.3 km/h; 36.2 mph). They carried enough fuel to give them a range of 2,400 nautical miles (4,400 km; 2,800 mi) at a speed of 15 knots (28 km/h; 17 mph). Their crew consisted of 110 officers and ratings.

The main armament of the Momo-class ships consisted of three quick-firing (QF) 12-centimetre (4.7 in) guns; one gun each was located at the bow and stern with the third gun positioned between the funnels. Their torpedo armament consisted of two triple rotating mounts for 450-millimetre (17.7 in) torpedoes located fore and aft of the funnels.

== Construction and career ==
Momo was launched on 12 October 1916 at the Sasebo Naval Arsenal and completed on 23 December. The ship played a minor role in World War I and participated in the 1937 Battle of Shanghai that began the Second Sino-Japanese War. She was decommissioned on 1 April 1940 and subsequently broken up.

== Bibliography ==
- Friedman, Norman (1985). "Japan". In Gardiner, Robert & Gray, Randal (eds.). Conway's All the World's Fighting Ships 1906–1921. Annapolis: Naval Institute Press. ISBN 0-87021-907-3.
- Friedman, Norman (2011). Naval Weapons of World War One. Barnsley, South Yorkshire, UK: Seaforth. ISBN 978-1-84832-100-7.
- Jentschura, Hansgeorg; Jung, Dieter & Mickel, Peter (1977). Warships of the Imperial Japanese Navy, 1869–1945. Annapolis, Maryland: United States Naval Institute. ISBN 0-87021-893-X.
- Todaka, Kazushige; Fukui, Shizuo; Eldridge, Robert D. & Leonard, Graham B. (2020). Destroyers: Selected Photos from the Archives of the Kure Maritime Museum; the Best from the Collection of Shizuo Fukui's Photos of Japanese Warships. Japanese Naval Warship Photo Album. Annapolis, Maryland: Naval Institute Press. ISBN 978-1-59114-630-8.
- Watts, Anthony J. & Gordon, Brian G. (1971). The Imperial Japanese Navy. London: Macdonald. ISBN 0-35603-045-8.
