= Japanese destroyer Hinoki (1916) =

Japanese Destroyer Hinoki

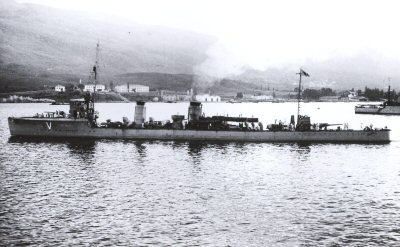
- A Momo-class destroyer, possibly Kashi

History

Empire of Japan
- Name: Hinoki
- Builder: Maizuru Naval Arsenal
- Launched: 25 December 1916
- Completed: 31 March 1917
- Decommissioned: 1 April 1940
- Fate: Scrapped, 1940

General characteristics
- Class & type: Momo-class destroyer
- Displacement: 835 long tons (848 t) (normal); 1,080 long tons (1,100 t) (full load)
- Length: 275 ft (83.8 m) (pp); 281 ft 8 in (85.9 m) (waterline)
- Beam: 25 ft 5 in (7.7 m)
- Draught: 7 ft 9 in (2.4 m)
- Installed power: 4 water-tube boilers; 16,000 shp (12,000 kW)
- Propulsion: 2 shafts; 2 steam turbines
- Speed: 31.5 knots (58.3 km/h; 36.2 mph)
- Range: 2,400 nmi (4,400 km; 2,800 mi) at 15 knots (28 km/h; 17 mph)
- Complement: 110
- Armament: 3 × single 12 cm (4.7 in) guns; 2 × triple 450 mm (17.7 in) torpedo tubes

Hinoki was one of four Momo-class destroyers built for the Imperial Japanese Navy during World War I. She was decommissioned in 1940 and subsequently scrapped.

== Design and description ==
The Momo-class destroyers were enlarged and faster versions of the preceding Kaba class with a more powerful armament. They displaced 835 long tons (848 t) at normal load and 1,080 long tons (1,100 t) at deep load. The ships had a length between perpendiculars of 275 feet (83.8 m) and a waterline length of 281 feet 8 inches (85.9 m), a beam of 25 feet 4 inches (7.7 m) and a draught of 7 feet 9 inches (2.4 m). The Momos were powered by two Brown-Curtis geared steam turbines, each driving one shaft using steam produced by four Kampon water-tube boilers. Two boilers burned a mixture of coal and fuel oil while the other pair only used oil. The engines produced a total of 16,000 shaft horsepower (12,000 kW) that gave the ships a maximum speed of 31.5 knots (58.3 km/h; 36.2 mph). They carried enough fuel to give them a range of 2,400 nautical miles (4,400 km; 2,800 mi) at a speed of 15 knots (28 km/h; 17 mph). Their crew consisted of 110 officers and ratings.

The main armament of the Momo-class ships consisted of three quick-firing (QF) 12-centimetre (4.7 in) guns; one gun each was located at the bow and stern with the third gun positioned between the funnels. Their torpedo armament consisted of two triple rotating mounts for 450-millimetre (17.7 in) torpedoes located fore and aft of the funnels.

== Construction and career ==
Hinoki was launched on 25 December 1916 at the Maizuru Naval Arsenal and completed on 31 March 1917. The ship played a minor role in World War I and participated in the 1937 Battle of Shanghai that began the Second Sino-Japanese War. She was decommissioned on 1 April 1940 and subsequently broken up.

== Bibliography ==
- Friedman, Norman (1985). "Japan". In Gardiner, Robert & Gray, Randal (eds.). Conway's All the World's Fighting Ships 1906–1921. Annapolis: Naval Institute Press. ISBN 0-87021-907-3.
- Friedman, Norman (2011). Naval Weapons of World War One. Barnsley, South Yorkshire, UK: Seaforth. ISBN 978-1-84832-100-7.
- Jentschura, Hansgeorg; Jung, Dieter & Mickel, Peter (1977). Warships of the Imperial Japanese Navy, 1869–1945. Annapolis, Maryland: United States Naval Institute. ISBN 0-87021-893-X.
- Todaka, Kazushige; Fukui, Shizuo; Eldridge, Robert D. & Leonard, Graham B. (2020). Destroyers: Selected Photos from the Archives of the Kure Maritime Museum; the Best from the Collection of Shizuo Fukui's Photos of Japanese Warships. Japanese Naval Warship Photo Album. Annapolis, Maryland: Naval Institute Press. ISBN 978-1-59114-630-8.
- Watts, Anthony J. & Gordon, Brian G. (1971). The Imperial Japanese Navy. London: Macdonald. ISBN 0-35603-045-8.
