= Momo Car-Sharing =

Car-sharing program

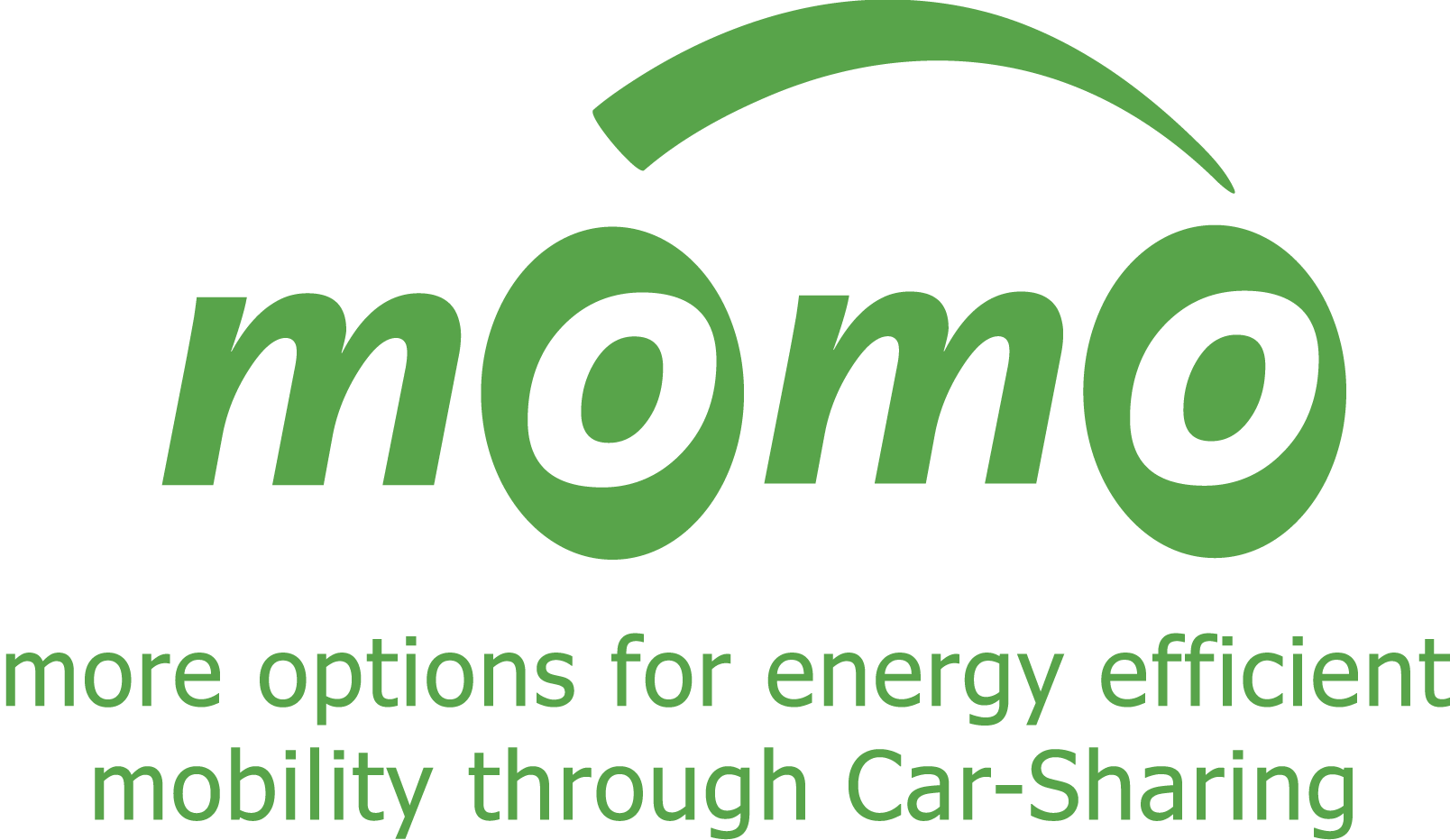
Official logo

Momo Car-Sharing was a car-sharing program conducted by Intelligent Energy Europe to promote alternatives to car ownership. It had a total budget of €2,693,644, half of which was co-financed by the European Union (EU). The project name momo was taken from the phrase "more options for energy efficient mobility through car-sharing".

The project started 1 October 2008 and included 14 partners from various EU countries. The International Association of Public Transport and Bundesverband CarSharing (the German association for car-sharing) also supported the project.

The program was part of a presentation by the city of Bremen in the Urban Best Practice Area at the World Exposition EXPO 2010 in Shanghai. The momo-project was presented in workshops on the EXPO and served as a reference for the inauguration of Car-Sharing in Shanghai.

The Bremen Car-Sharing Action Plan has also received the Travel Planning Award 2010 of the German Town Planner's Association SRL.

== Project objectives ==
Momo was designed as a component to reach the EU targets in the fields of transport, energy and the reduction of CO_{2} emissions. This European project aimed at raising the efficiency and attractiveness of Car-Sharing in Europe. By building on the potential of Car-Sharing in regards to saving energy, minimising greenhouse gases and improving the quality of urban live, a significant increase of the Car-Sharing services and the Car-Sharing demand had been aimed for. To reach those goals the project partner designed a concept that included all relevant stakeholders at most. These are next to local authorities and Car-Sharing providers, public transport providers, energy agencies and research facilities.

The project expected to have the following results:

- more than 20,000 new car-sharers
- the reduction of about 58,000GJ p.a. and CO_{2} emissions of 6,000t p.a
- to replace 3,500 private cars and gain free space due to less parking spaces needed
- to acquire new regions where no car-share is present at the moment, with a special focus on Ireland, Finland and Greece

== Notable facts ==
Notable facts of the momo project are:

- Project name: momo Car-Sharing, more options for energy efficient mobility through Car-Sharing
- Supported by Intelligent Energy Europe
- Lead partner: Der Senator für Umwelt, Bau, Verkehr und Europa, Bremen, Germany
- Start of the project: 1 October 2008
- Ending date: 30 September 2011
- Duration: 35 months
- Total budget: €2,693,644

Project partners were:

- Der Senator für Umwelt, Bau, Verkehr und Europa (The Senator for Environment, Building, Traffic and Europe), Bremen, Germany
- Cambio Mobilitätsservice GmbH & Co.KG, Bremen, Germany
- Bundesverband CarSharing (bcs), Hanover, Germany
- Mendes Limited, Cork, Ireland
- GoCar, Cork, Ireland
- Fundació Mobilitat Sostenible i Segura, Barcelona, Spain
- Motiva, Helsinki, Finland
- International Union for Public Transport UITP, Brussels, Belgium
- Bond Beter Leefmilieu, Brussels, Belgium
- Taxistop, Brussels, Belgium
- Institute for Environmental Policy, p.b.c., Prague, Czech Republic
- Italian Ministry of Environment, Land and Sea (IME), Rome, Italy
- Italian National Agency for New Technologies, Energy and the Environment (ENEA), Rome, Italy
- Center for Renewable Energy Sources (CRES), Athens, Greece
