= Momo-class destroyer =

Class of Imperial Japanese Navy destroyers

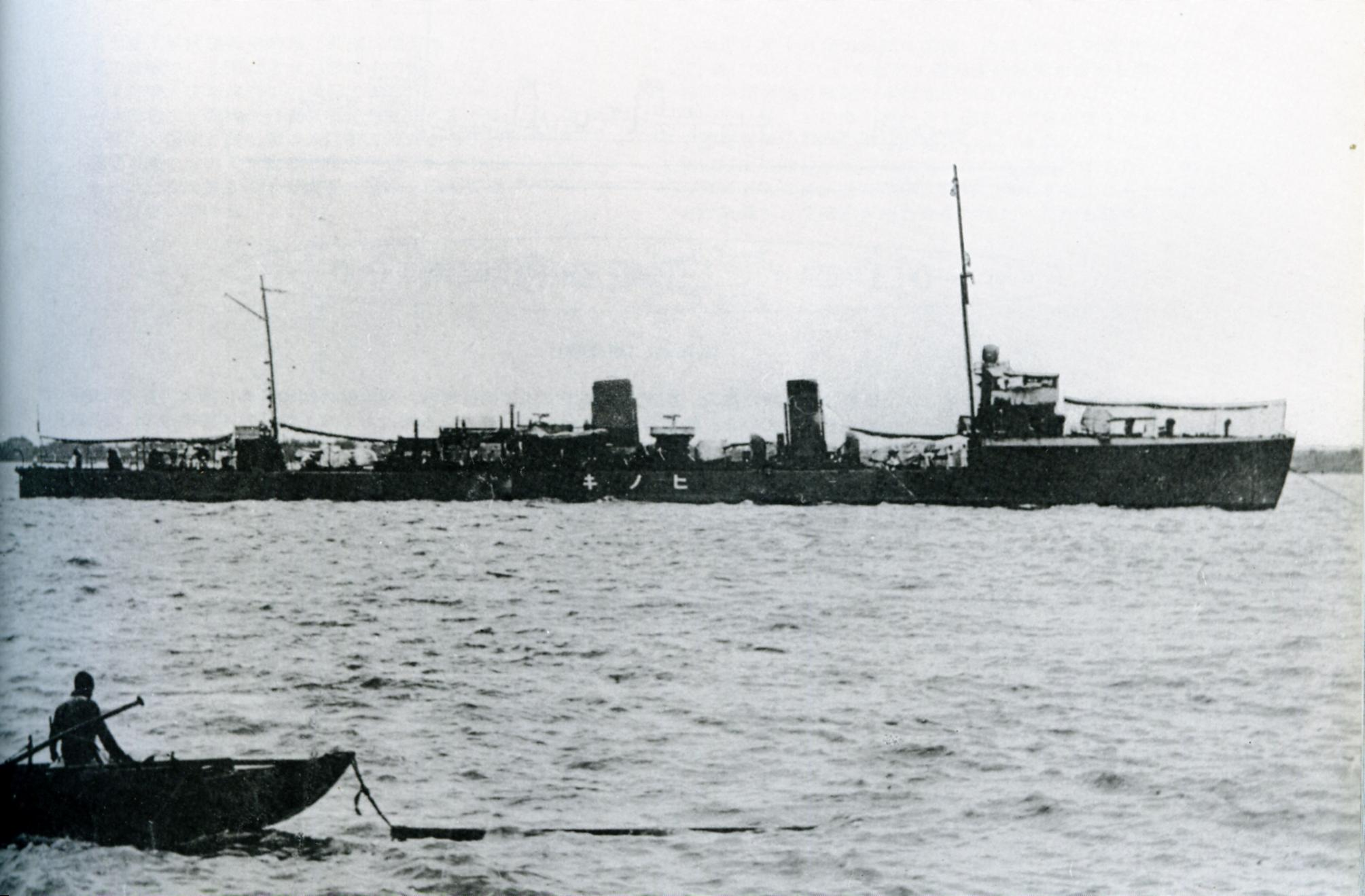
- Hinoki on patrol at Wuhan, China, 1923

Class overview
- Builders: Maizuru Naval Arsenal; Kure Naval Arsenal
- Operators: Imperial Japanese Navy; Manchukuo Imperial Navy
- Preceded by: Isokaze class
- Succeeded by: Enoki class
- Built: 1916–1917
- In commission: 1916–1944
- Completed: 4
- Lost: 1
- Scrapped: 3

General characteristics
- Type: Destroyer
- Displacement: 835 long tons (848 t) (normal); 1,080 long tons (1,100 t) (full load)
- Length: 275 ft (83.8 m) (pp); 281 ft 8 in (85.9 m) (waterline)
- Beam: 25 ft 5 in (7.7 m)
- Draught: 7 ft 9 in (2.4 m)
- Installed power: 4 water-tube boilers; 16,000 shp (12,000 kW)
- Propulsion: 2 shafts; 2 steam turbines
- Speed: 31.5 knots (58.3 km/h; 36.2 mph)
- Range: 2,400 nmi (4,400 km; 2,800 mi) at 15 knots (28 km/h; 17 mph)
- Complement: 110
- Armament: 3 × single 12 cm/40 41st Year Type naval guns; 2 × triple 450 mm (17.7 in) torpedo tubes

The Momo-class destroyer (桃型駆逐艦, Momogata kuchikukan) consisted of four destroyers built for the Imperial Japanese Navy during World War I. As with the previous Kaba class, all were named after trees.

== Background ==
The Momo-class destroyers were designed as part of the first phase of the Hachi-Hachi Kantai program of the Imperial Japanese Navy, at the same time as the large Isokaze class. With the commissioning of the new high speed battleships Yamashiro and Ise, escort vessels with equally high speed and blue ocean capabilities were required. However, the Japanese Navy could not afford to build many large destroyers, so it was decided to split production between large "1st-class destroyers" (i.e. the Isokaze class) and new medium-sized "2nd class destroyers" (i.e. the Momo class).

Four vessels were built under the fiscal 1915 budget, with the order split between Maizuru Naval Arsenal and Sasebo Naval Arsenal.

== Design ==
The Momo-class ships were a scaled-down version of the Isokaze class and retained many of the innovations introduced by that class: curved, rather than straight bow, torpedo tubes, geared turbines, and a single-caliber main battery.

Internally, the engines were heavy fuel oil-fired steam turbine engines. Two vessels (Hinoki and Yanagi) used Brown-Curtis turbine engines, and the other two (Momo and Kashi) used Japanese-designed geared turbine engines. The smaller engines gave a smaller rated power of 16,700 shp, which allowed only for a speed of 31.5 knots (58.3 km/h), and limited range due to high fuel consumption.

Armament was slightly less than the Isokaze class, with three instead of four QF 4.7 inch Gun Mk I - IV guns, pedestal mounted along the centerline of the vessel, front, mid-ship and to the stern. The number of torpedoes was the same as the Isokaze (i.e. two triple launchers).

== Operational history ==
The Momo-class destroyers were completed in time to serve in the very final stages of World War I. As the Japanese 15th Destroyer Flotilla under the cruiser Izumo, they were based at Malta from August 1917. The Japanese fleet was nominally independent, but carried out operations under the direction of the Royal Navy command on Malta, primarily in escort operations for transport and troopship convoys and in anti-submarine warfare operations against German U-boats in the Mediterranean.

Kashi was transferred to the Manchukuo Imperial Navy on 1 May 1937 and was renamed Hai Wei. However, on 6 June 1942, Hai Wei was transferred back to the Imperial Japanese Navy, and reclassified as the auxiliary escort Kari. The ship fought in World War II, and was sunk by United States Navy aircraft from TF38 off of Okinawa on 10 October 1944.

The remaining three vessels were retired on 1 April 1940 and broken up, except for Yanagi, which was retained as a training hulk until 1947. Yanagi's hull was eventually used as part of the breakwater at Kitakyushu alongside the Suzutsuki. The remains are still visible at 33°55′48.6″N 130°49′19.9″E.

== Ships ==
Construction data
Name	Kanji	Translation	Builder	Laid down	Launched	Completed	Fate
Momo	桃	Peach Tree	Sasebo Naval Arsenal	28 February 1916	12 October 1916	23 December 1916	Scrapped, 1 April 1940
Kashi	樫	Evergreen Oak Tree	Maizuru Naval Arsenal	15 March 1916	1 December 1916	31 March 1917	Transferred to Manchukuo, 1 May 1937, as Hai Wei; Returned to IJN, 29 June 1942, as Kaii, sunk by air attack off Okinawa, 10 October 1944
Hinoki	檜	Japanese Cypress Tree	Maizuru Naval Arsenal	5 May 1916	25 December 1916	31 March 1917	Scrapped, 1 May 1940
Yanagi	柳	Willow Tree	Sasebo Naval Arsenal	21 October 1916	24 February 1917	5 May 1917	Retired, 1 May 1940; training hulk to 1 April 1947

== In film ==
In the 1958 World War II film Run Silent, Run Deep, Clark Gable's character is obsessed with sinking what he refers to as an "Akikaze"-class destroyer. To test his radically aggressive head-on "down the throat" attack plan, he first engages one of the smaller "Momo"-class destroyers. His completely unconventional attack works and he sinks the destroyer. Having proven the viability of his tactic, he then attacks a larger and far more dangerous destroyer that he calls an "Akikaze"-class destroyer. He believes it is the ship that claimed his previous submarine and four others. In reality, the destroyer "Akikaze" was one of 16 "Minekaze"-class destroyers. There was no "Akikaze" class, although it is referred to as if "Akikaze" were the name of the class throughout the movie. The actual "Minekaze" class, of which the real "Akikaze" was a member is never mentioned.
