= Japanese destroyer Fuyuzuki =

Two Japanese destroyers have been named Fuyuzuki or archaically Fuyutsuki:

- Japanese destroyer Fuyutsuki, an Akizuki-class destroyer launched in 1944 and scrapped in 1948
- JS Fuyuzuki, an Akizuki-class destroyer launched in 2012
