= Japanese destroyer Niizuki =

Akizuki-class destroyer

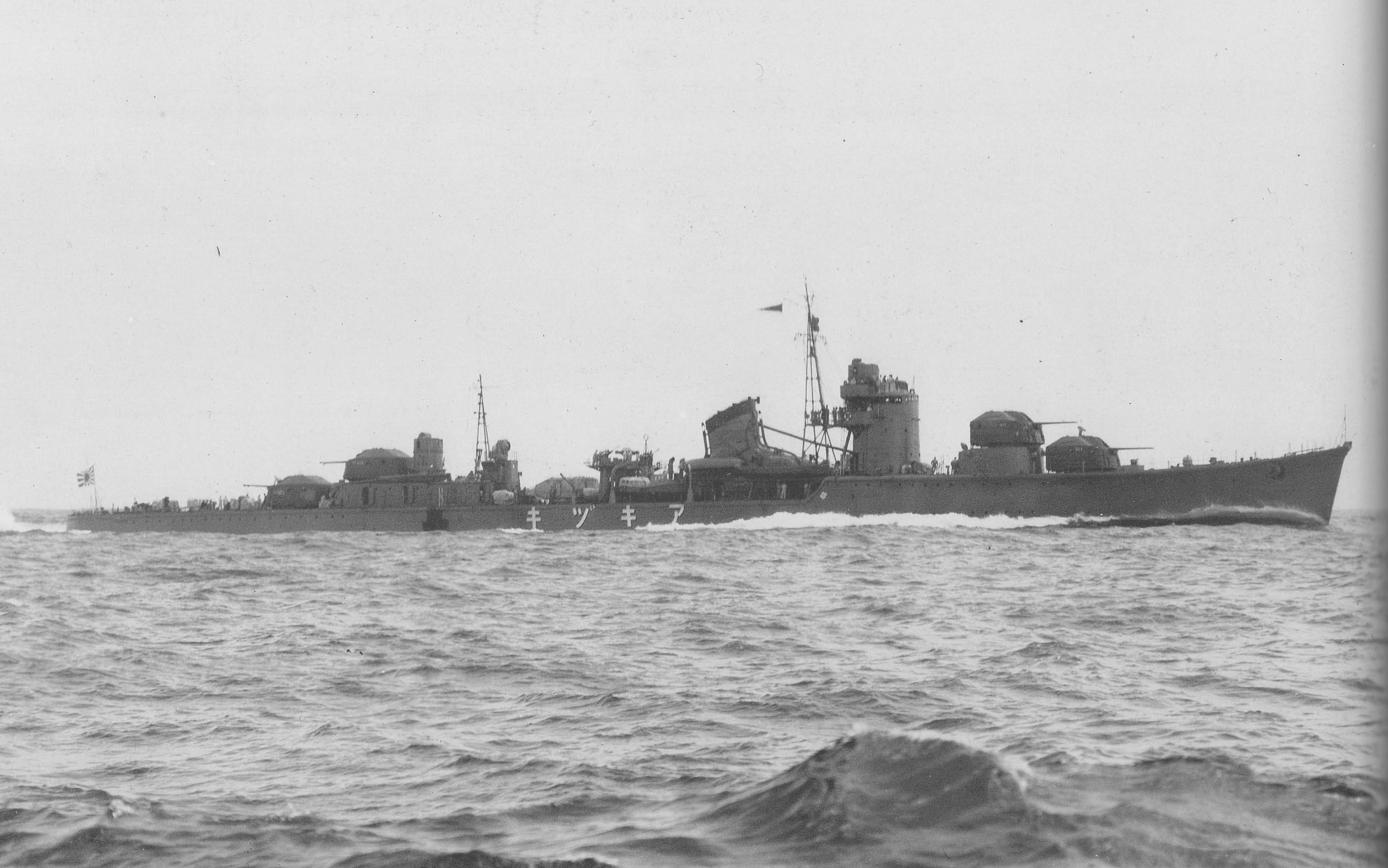
- Sister ship Akizuki, 17 May 1942

History

Empire of Japan
- Name: Niizuki
- Builder: Mitsubishi Nagasaki Shipyard
- Laid down: 8 December 1941
- Launched: 29 June 1942
- Completed: 31 March 1943
- Commissioned: 31 March 1943
- Stricken: 10 September 1943
- Fate: Sunk, Battle of Kula Gulf, 6 July 1943

General characteristics
- Class & type: Akizuki-class destroyer
- Displacement: 2,701 long tons (2,744 t) (standard)
- Length: 134.2 m (440 ft 3 in)
- Beam: 11.6 m (38 ft 1 in)
- Draft: 4.15 m (13 ft 7 in)
- Installed power: 3 × water-tube boilers; 52,000 shp (38,776 kW)
- Propulsion: 2 × shafts; 2 × geared steam turbines
- Speed: 33 knots (61 km/h; 38 mph)
- Range: 8,300 nmi (15,400 km; 9,600 mi) at 18 knots (33 km/h; 21 mph)
- Complement: 300
- Sensors & processing systems: Type 21 early-warning radar
- Armament: 4 × twin 100 mm (3.9 in) DP guns; 4 × triple 25 mm (1 in) AA guns; 1 × quadruple 610 mm (24 in) torpedo tubes; 2 × depth charge throwers; 54 × depth charges

Service record
- Operations: Battle of Kula Gulf
- Victories: USS Strong (DD-467) (1942)

Niizuki (新月; "New Moon") was an Akizuki-class destroyer built for the Imperial Japanese Navy (IJN) during World War II. Completed in early 1943, she only lasted three months in service until her actions as Japanese flagship of the Battle of Kula Gulf. In the darkness of 5 July 1943, Niizuki torpedoed and sank the destroyer USS Strong at a debated range, possibly as far out as 22,000 yards, making her the scorer of one of the longest ranged torpedo hits in history. Around 24 hours later, Niizuki was caught and sunk by a US cruiser-destroyer force with the loss of almost all hands.

== Design and description ==
The Akizuki-class ships were originally designed as anti-aircraft escorts for carrier battle groups, but were modified with torpedo tubes and depth charges to meet the need for more general-purpose destroyers. The ships measured 134.2 meters (440 ft 3 in) overall, with beams of 11.6 meters (38 ft 1 in) and drafts of 4.15 meters (13 ft 7 in). They displaced 2,701 long tons (2,744 t) at standard load and 3,420 long tons (3,470 t) at deep load. Their crews numbered 300 officers and enlisted men.

Each ship had two Kampon geared steam turbines, each driving one propeller shaft using steam provided by three Kampon water-tube boilers. The turbines were rated at a total of 52,000 shaft horsepower (38,776 kW) for a designed speed of 33 knots (61 km/h; 38 mph). The ships carried enough fuel oil to give them ranges of 8,300 nautical miles (15,400 km; 9,600 mi) at speeds of 18 knots (33 km/h; 21 mph).

The main armament of the Akizuki class consisted of eight 100-millimeter (3.9 in) Type 98 dual-purpose guns in four twin-gun turrets, two superfiring pairs fore and aft of the superstructure. They each carried a dozen 25-millimeter (1 in) Type 96 anti-aircraft (AA) guns in four triple-gun mounts. The ships were also each armed with four 610-millimeter (24 in) torpedo tubes in a single quadruple rotating mount amidships; one reload was carried for each tube. The first batch of ships were each equipped with two depth charge throwers for which 54 depth charges were carried. Niizuki was equipped with a Type 21 early-warning radar on her foremast.

== Construction and career ==
Niizuki was commissioned on 31 March 1943, and she sailed on her maiden voyage to Sasebo under the leadership of Commander Kaneda Kiyoshi, where a series of training duties was conducted between Sasebo, Kure, and Hashirajima. Niizuki spent all of April transiting between Japanese ports, which included escorting the heavy cruiser Mogami to Kure in response of the American invasion of the Attu Islands.

On 16 June, Niizuki finally departed Japan as part of a large task force of destroyers escorting the Japanese fleet to Saipan. The next day, the force was intercepted by the submarine USS Flying Fish, but no ship was damaged as on the 19th Niizuki arrived at her destination. Niizuki then departed for Truk, arriving the day afterwards. From the 23rd to 25th, Niizuki took part on a troop transport run to Rabaul, and upon arriving, she was chosen by rear admiral Akiyama Teruo as his flagship of the entirety of destroyer squadron 3. On the 30th was ordered central Solomons in response of American threats of invasion. On 1 July, she arrived at Bougainville, and the next day departed as flagship of a bombardment mission on Rendova. Close to midnight, Niizuki finally saw her first action firing off her eight 3.9-inch (10 cm) guns with a group of six other destroyers led by the light cruiser Yubari, shelling the enemy defenses with intense gunfire before retreating back to homebase. While underway, Niizuki's group was attacked by the American torpedo boats PT-156, PT-157, and PT-161. which all fired six torpedoes at the Japanese destroyers, but none hit as Niizuki chased off the trio with her gunfire, claiming two of them sunk (though all three survived).

=== Battle of Kula Gulf ===
Main Article: Battle of Kula Gulf

On the night of 4 July, Niizuki departed Buin as the cover force for a Japanese troop transport mission to Kolombangara, which carried 1,300 ground troops and 180 tons of ammunitions and provisions. Just over an hour before midnight, the force: consisting of leading the elderly destroyers Nagatsuki, Satsuki, and Yūnagi, arrived at the scene of Kolombangara and prepared to unload their men and supplies, but as the night of the 4th transformed into the early morning of the 5th, Niizuki's search radar located what appeared to be an enemy task force. As it turned out, a group of American warships were tasked with conducting shore bombardment on Bairoko Harbor, and the ships picked up by Niizuki were a flotilla of American destroyers tasked with scouting ahead of the American cruisers. Niizuki led the other destroyers at an extremely long-range torpedo attack on the enemy ships-Niizuki and Nagatsuki each fired four torpedoes, while Yūnagi fired six. The older torpedoes of the older destroyers eventually ran out of fuel, but one of Niizuki's type 93 "long lance" torpedoes continued on and smashed into the destroyer USS Strong. The torpedo hit her port side amidships and destroyed her engine, leaving her dead in the water and beginning to sink. As the destroyer USS Chevalier intentionally rammed Strong's bow to evacuate her survivors, shore batteries opened fire and chased off her allied ships, as Strong broke apart and sank with the loss of 50 men. Sources differ on the exact range of the torpedo hit, but regardless list it at extreme range, anywhere from 19,000 yards to over 22,000 yards. If the latter reported range is true, this would credit Niizuki with one of the longest ranged torpedo hits in history; rivaled by a torpedo from the heavy cruiser Haguro which hit and sank the Dutch destroyer Kortenaer at 22,000 yards.

However, the presence of American warships still halted the Japanese effort to reinforce Kolombangara, and thus the four ships retreated. However, their efforts were not over; later that night Niizuki would serve as Admiral Teruo's flagship of a much larger transport mission, Niizuki in particular leading the destroyers Suzukaze and Tanikaze as a protection group for seven other destroyers transporting 2,600 soldiers and 180 tons on munitions. The operation initially sailed smoothly, only for the task force to be spotted by allied coast watchers, which alerted their presence to the very same American cruiser-destroyer group which Niizuki had encountered the previous night. In the darkness of the early morning, 5 July 1943, the battle experienced light cruisers USS Honolulu, USS Saint Louis, and USS Helena, with an escort of four destroyers, located three enemy ships on radar; this was Niizuki, Suzukaze, and Tanikaze, and they prepared to fire on the lead ship.

A total of forty-five 6-inch (152 mm) guns and a dozen 5-inch (127 mm) guns rained hellfire on Niizuki at a distance of 4,400 yards, the first salvo scored a hit, and within moments Niizuki caught fire as shell hits smothered the destroyer, rendering her dead in the water. While for the longest time it was unknown if Niizuki retaliated, the discovery of her wreck proved she managed to train her forward guns and unload several salvos and even unleashed a full spread of four torpedoes. However, it was too late as after receiving many shell hits, Niizuki furiously burned and staggered out of formation limping at 11 knots. It's very likely Niizuki was then hit by one or two torpedoes from the destroyer USS Nicholas, which would have delivered the finishing blow to the already crippled destroyer. Shortly after 1:00, Niizuki slipped beneath the waves and sank, 290 were dead, including Admiral Teruo and Commander Kiyoshi. The quantity of survivors is debated, but few in numbers. Only somewhere around a dozen either swam ashore, either to be rescued or captured by American forces, or were saved by the Japanese destroyer Amagiri.

However, Niizuki's sacrifice was not in vain. The American cruiser's tunnel vision on the Japanese flagship allowed for Suzukaze and Tanikaze to continue mostly unattacked, and each unloaded a spread of eight torpedoes before retreating. These torpedoes were aimed at the Helena, which had expended her flashless charges, and within 3 minutes one of these torpedoes, probably from Suzukaze, hit and blew off Helena's entire bow in a potential magazine explosion. Two minutes later, two more torpedoes, probably from Tanikaze, hit amidships and destroyed Helena's engine, boilers, and tore apart her keel. Within minutes, the previously charmed American light cruiser broke apart and sank with the loss of 168 men. The battle of Kula Gulf, in spite of Niizuki's loss, was completed in a Japanese victory, they sank far more American shipping than they lost and successfully landed the ground troops, reinforcing Kolombangara.

== Wreck ==
Niizuki's wreck was discovered by RV Petrel in January 2019. She sits upright in 745 meters (2,444 feet) of water and is heavily damaged. Surprisingly, her mast is still attached and completely upright. The wreck's discovery is noteworthy in that no photos of Niizuki in service are known to exist.
