= Japanese destroyer Yoizuki =

Fuyutsuki-class destroyer

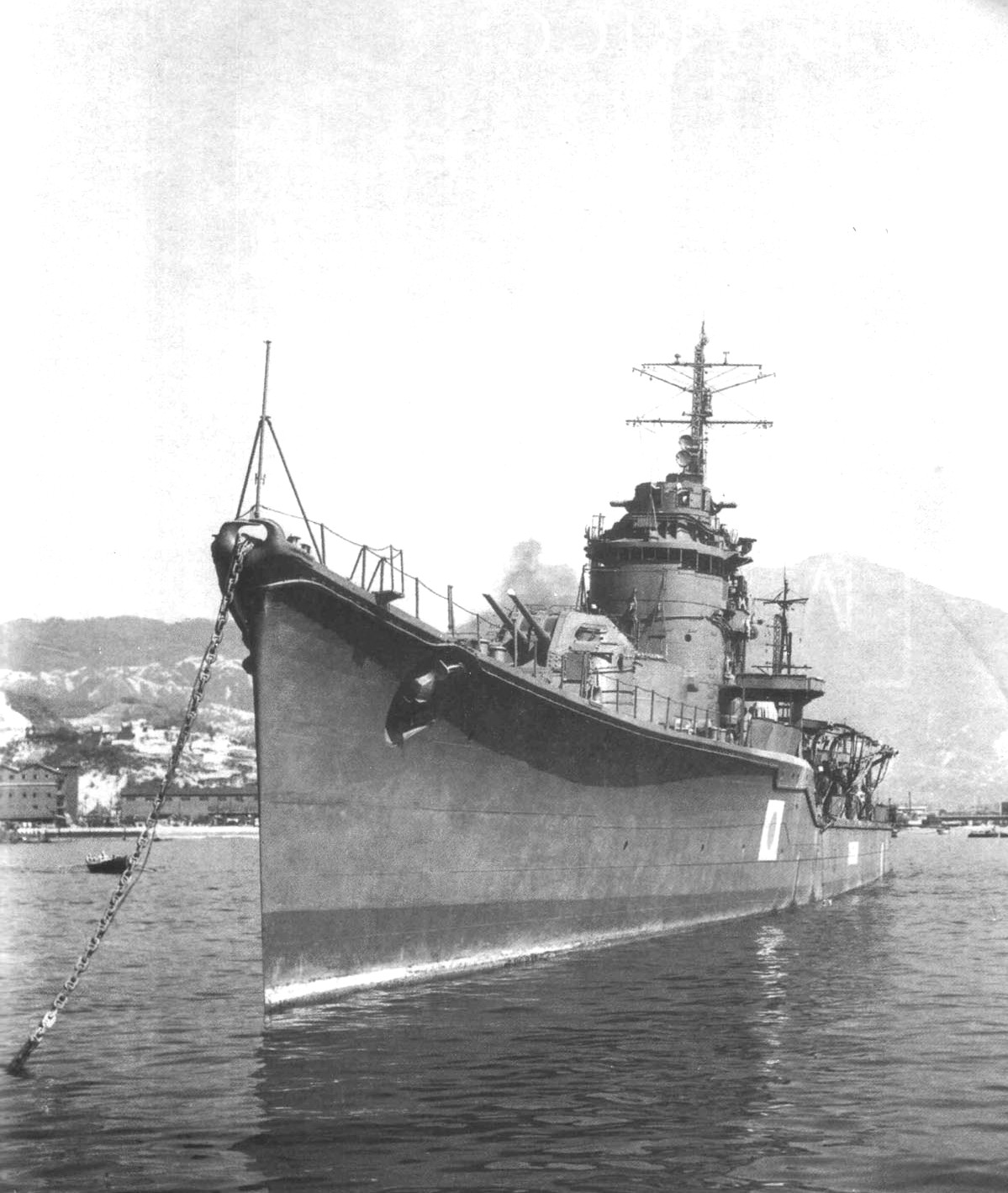
- Yoizuki in Kure on 16 October 1945, after the war.

History

Empire of Japan
- Name: Yoizuki
- Builder: Uraga Dock Company
- Laid down: 25 August 1943
- Launched: 25 September 1944
- Completed: 31 January 1945
- Commissioned: 31 January 1945
- Stricken: 5 October 1945
- Fate: Transferred to Republic of China Navy, 29 August 1947

Republic of China
- Name: Fen Yang
- Acquired: 29 August 1947
- Commissioned: February 1949
- Reclassified: As a training ship, 1 October 1949
- Fate: Scrapped, 1963

General characteristics
- Class & type: Akizuki-class destroyer
- Displacement: 2,700 long tons (2,743 t) standard; 3,700 long tons (3,759 t) full load
- Length: 134.2 m (440 ft 3 in)
- Beam: 11.6 m (38 ft 1 in)
- Draft: 4.15 m (13 ft 7 in)
- Propulsion: 4 × Kampon type boilers; 2 × Parsons geared turbines; 2 × shafts, 50,000 shp (37 MW)
- Speed: 33 knots (38 mph; 61 km/h)
- Range: 8,300 nmi (15,400 km) at 18 kn (21 mph; 33 km/h)
- Complement: 263
- Armament: 8 × 100 mm (4 in)/65 cal Type 98 DP guns; Unknown × Type 96 25 mm (0.98 in) AA guns (3×7 + 1×up to 40); 4 × 610 mm (24 in) torpedo tubes; 16 × Type 93 torpedoes; 54 × Type 95 depth charges

Yoizuki (宵月, "Evening Moon") was an Akizuki-class destroyer of the Imperial Japanese Navy. She was commissioned too late to see action in World War II. Following the war, the ship was handed over to the Republic of China and renamed Fen Yang.

== Design and description ==
The Akizuki-class ships were originally designed as anti-aircraft escorts for carrier battle groups, but were modified with torpedo tubes and depth charges to meet the need for more general-purpose destroyers. The ships measured 134.2 meters (440 ft 3 in) overall, with beams of 11.6 meters (38 ft 1 in) and drafts of 4.15 meters (13 ft 7 in). They displaced 2,701 long tons (2,744 t) at standard load and 3,420 long tons (3,470 t) at deep load. Their crews numbered 300 officers and enlisted men.

Each ship had two Kampon geared steam turbines, each driving one propeller shaft using steam provided by three Kampon water-tube boilers. The turbines were rated at a total of 52,000 shaft horsepower (38,776 kW) for a designed speed of 33 knots (61 km/h; 38 mph). The ships carried enough fuel oil to give them ranges of 8,300 nautical miles (15,400 km; 9,600 mi) at speeds of 18 knots (33 km/h; 21 mph).

The main armament of the Akizuki class consisted of eight 10 cm Type 98 dual-purpose guns in four twin-gun turrets, one superfiring pair fore and aft of the superstructure. Yoizuki was equipped with 41 Type 96 25-millimeter (1 in) anti-aircraft (AA) guns in seven triple-gun mounts and twenty single mounts. The ships were also each armed with four 610-millimeter (24 in) torpedo tubes in a single quadruple rotating mount amidships for Type 93 (Long Lance) torpedoes; one reload was carried for each tube. The later batches of ships were each equipped with two depth charge throwers and two sets of rails for which 72 depth charges were carried. Yoizuki was equipped with a Type 13 early-warning radar on her mainmast and a Type 22 surface-search radar on her foremast.

== Construction and career ==
In March, 1946, Yoizuki was used to transport over 1,000 Formosans, Filipinos and Japanese prisoners of war from Sydney, Australia. The conditions aboard ship and the obvious distress of the repatriates prompted controversy in Australia. On 29 August 1947, Yoizuki was turned over to the Republic of China. Renamed CNS Fen Yang, she was scrapped in 1963.
