= Japanese destroyer Shimotsuki =

Akizuki-class destroyer

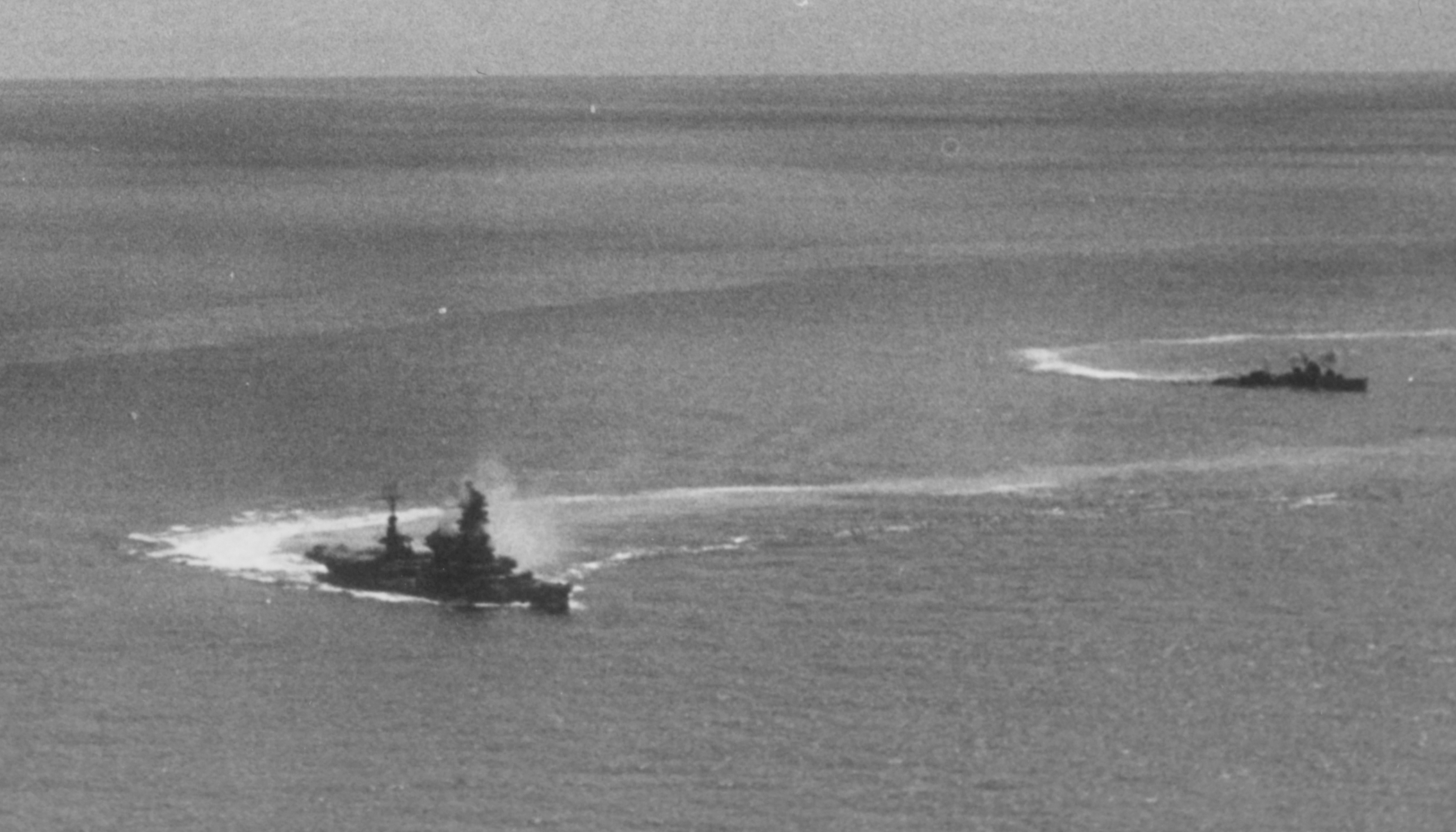
- Battleship Ise and destroyer Shimotsuki during the Battle off Cape Engaño

History

Empire of Japan
- Name: Shimotsuki
- Builder: Mitsubishi Nagasaki Shipyard
- Laid down: 6 July 1942
- Launched: 7 April 1943
- Completed: 31 March 1944
- Commissioned: 31 March 1944
- Stricken: 10 January 1945
- Fate: Sunk, 25 November 1944

General characteristics
- Displacement: 2,701 long tons (2,744 t) (standard)
- Length: 134.2 m (440 ft 3 in)
- Beam: 11.6 m (38 ft 1 in)
- Draft: 4.15 m (13 ft 7 in)
- Installed power: 3 × water-tube boilers; 52,000 shp (38,776 kW)
- Propulsion: 2 × shafts; 2 × geared steam turbines
- Speed: 33 knots (61 km/h; 38 mph)
- Range: 8,300 nmi (15,400 km; 9,600 mi) at 18 knots (33 km/h; 21 mph)
- Complement: 300
- Armament: 8 × 100 mm (4 in) DP guns; 35 × 25 mm AA guns (3×7 + 1×14); 4 × 610 mm (24 in) torpedo tubes; 56 × Type 95 depth charges

Shimotsuki (霜月) was an Akizuki-class destroyer of the Imperial Japanese Navy. Her name means "November".

== Design and description ==
The Akizuki-class ships were originally designed as anti-aircraft escorts for carrier battle groups, but were modified with torpedo tubes and depth charges to meet the need for more general-purpose destroyers. The ships measured 134.2 meters (440 ft 3 in) overall, with a beam of 11.6 meters (38 ft 1 in) and a draft of 4.15 meters (13 ft 7 in). They displaced 2,701 long tons (2,744 t) at standard load and 3,420 long tons (3,470 t) at deep load. Their crews numbered 300 officers and enlisted men.

Each ship had two Kampon geared steam turbines, each driving one propeller shaft using steam provided by three Kampon water-tube boilers. The turbines were rated at a total of 52,000 shaft horsepower (38,776 kW) for a designed speed of 33 knots (61 km/h; 38 mph). The ships carried enough fuel oil to give them ranges of 8,300 nautical miles (15,400 km; 9,600 mi) at speeds of 18 knots (33 km/h; 21 mph).

The main armament of the Akizuki class consisted of eight 100-millimeter (3.9 in) Type 98 dual-purpose guns in four twin-gun turrets, two superfiring pairs fore and aft of the superstructure. They each carried a dozen 25-millimeter (1 in) Type 96 anti-aircraft (AA) guns in four triple-gun mounts. The ships were also each armed with four 610-millimeter (24 in) torpedo tubes in a single quadruple rotating mount amidships; one reload was carried for each tube. The first batch of ships were each equipped with two depth-charge throwers for which 54 depth charges were carried. Shimotsuki was equipped with a Type 21 early-warning radar on her foremast.

== Construction and career ==
Shimotsuki's career began before completion; in January of 1943 her sister ship Akizuki was crippled by a torpedo from the submarine USS Nautilus. Later that July, Shimotsuki's entire bow was removed up to frame 75 to replace Akizuki's broken bow, significantly delaying Shimotsuki's construction. She was finally commissioned on 31 March 1944 in Nagasaki under the leadership of lieutenant commander Hatano Kenji.

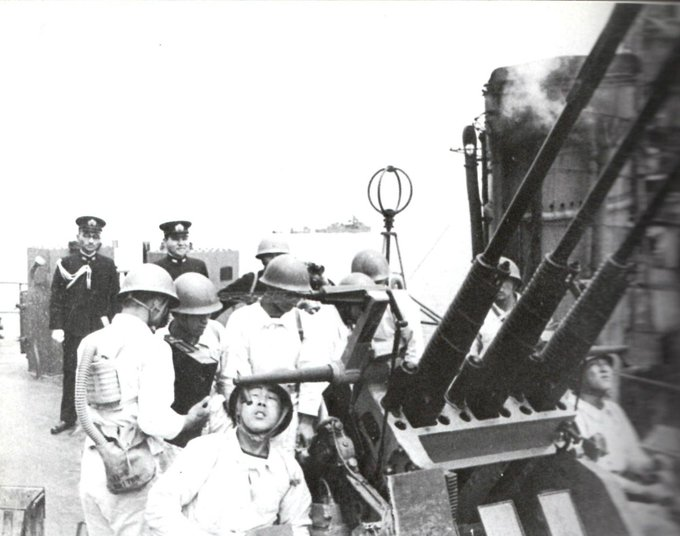
Shimotsuki anchored behind the light cruiser Ōyodo, June 1944

For the entirety of April and May, Shimotsuki exclusively operated off Japan for a variety of training duties and transits between Japanese harbors. She only departed Japan for the first time on 10 June for Tawi-Tawi, rendezvousing with the Japanese fleet in preparation for the battle of the Philippine Sea, which occurred from the 19th to 20th; Shimotsuki witnessed the sinking of the aircraft carriers Taihō and Shōkaku to American submarines and was damaged by bomb near misses which jammed her steering. She in turn claimed to have shot down two enemy planes before retreating to Okinawa. At the end of June, a refit in Yokosuka installed several additional AA guns and type 13 radar.

On 9 July, Shimotsuki took part on a troop transport run to Manila, and shortly afterwards she was appointed as Captain Wakida Kiichiro's flagship of destroyer division 21, and undertook training duties off Lingga for the rest of the month. She then spent the first half of August on convoy escorting missions, then the second half on training duty. On 12 October, she assisted her damaged sister ship Fuyutsuki which was torpedoed by the submarine USS Trepang, before departing for Brunei. On 25 October 1944, Shimotsuki escorted the decoy aircraft carrier force at the battle of Leyte Gulf, during which air attacks sank all four aircraft carriers and several supporting ships, prompting Shimtotsuki to evacuate the sinking light carrier Chitose, then escort the battleships Ise and Hyūga. While underway, they were attacked by dive bombers operating from USS Enterprise; both Hyūga and Shimotsuki were damaged by bomb near misses.

On the 27th, Shimotsuki was docked for repairs, then escorted Hyūga to Kure, arriving on 19th, where they were both further drydocked for repairs. With the start of November, Shimotsuki was ordered to Manila, where she rounded out the rest of her career with a series of convoy escorting missions. Her career came to a close on 25 November 1944, as while she was escorting a troop convoy in the defense of Manila, the force was detected by the submarine USS Cavalla. The battle experienced Cavalla previously sank Shōkaku at the Philippine Sea battle, and was ready for action again, unleashing a full spread of six torpedoes. Four of these torpedoes struck Shimotsuki. Within an instant, the destroyer was basted apart and sank nearly instantly with a horrific loss of life, some 290 men were killed, including the Commander of Escort Squadron 31 Rear Admiral Edo Heitaro and his staff, ComDesDiv 21 Captain Wakida and his entire staff, and Commander Hatano and all of his senior officers. Surprisingly, 46 men did survive the sinking and were rescued by the destroyer escort Momo.
