= Japanese destroyer Harutsuki =

Akizuki-class destroyer

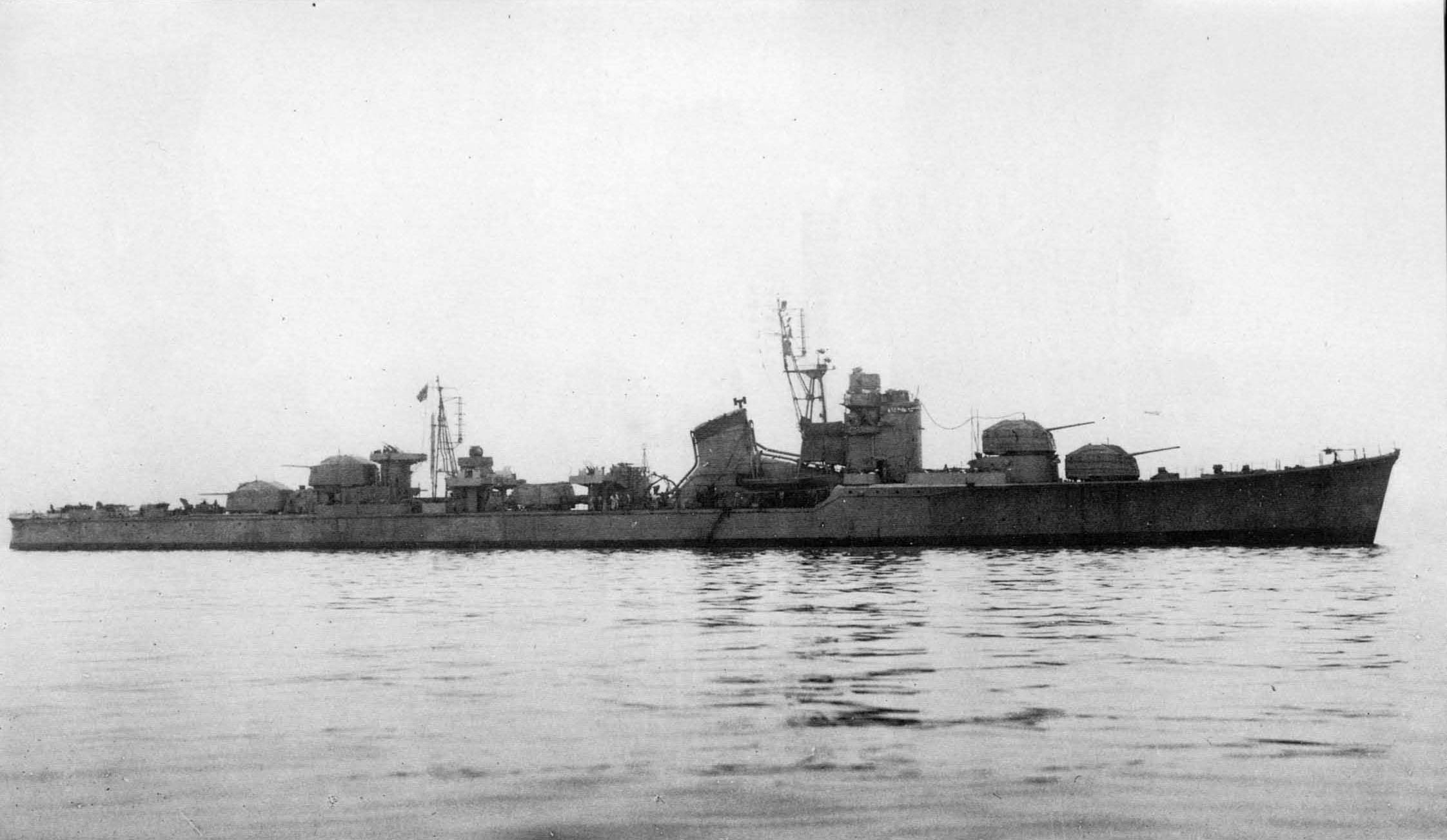
- Harutsuki in December 1944

History

Empire of Japan
- Name: Harutsuki
- Builder: Sasebo Naval Arsenal
- Laid down: 23 December 1943
- Launched: 3 August 1944
- Completed: 28 December 1944
- Commissioned: 28 December 1944, 11th Destroyer Squadron
- Stricken: 5 October 1945
- Fate: Transferred to the Soviet Union, 28 August 1947

Soviet Union
- Name: Vnezapny (Внезапный)
- Acquired: 28 August 1947
- Commissioned: 25 September 1947, 5th Fleet
- Renamed: Oskol (1949); TsL-64 (1955); PKZ-37
- Stricken: 4 June 1969
- Fate: Scrapped

General characteristics
- Class & type: Akizuki-class destroyer
- Displacement: 2,700 long tons (2,743 t) standard; 3,700 long tons (3,759 t) full load
- Length: 134.2 m (440 ft 3 in)
- Beam: 11.6 m (38 ft 1 in)
- Draft: 4.15 m (13 ft 7 in)
- Propulsion: 4 × Kampon type boilers; 2 × Parsons geared turbines; 2 × shafts, 50,000 shp (37 MW)
- Speed: 33 knots (38 mph; 61 km/h)
- Range: 8,300 nmi (15,400 km) at 18 kn (21 mph; 33 km/h)
- Complement: 263
- Armament: 8 × 100 mm (4 in)/65 cal Type 98 DP guns; 39 × Type 96 25 mm (0.98 in) AA guns (3×5 + 24x1); 4 × 610 mm (24 in) torpedo tubes; 8 × Type 93 torpedoes; 54 × Type 95 depth charges

Harutsuki (春月, "Spring Moon") was an Akizuki-class destroyer of the Imperial Japanese Navy. Her name means "Spring Moon". She was different from her other sisters, as she was built as a flagship for the Escort Fleet.

== Design and description ==
The Akizuki-class ships were originally designed as anti-aircraft escorts for carrier battle groups, but were modified with torpedo tubes and depth charges to meet the need for more general-purpose destroyers. The ships measured 134.2 meters (440 ft 3 in) overall, with beams of 11.6 meters (38 ft 1 in) and drafts of 4.15 meters (13 ft 7 in). They displaced 2,701 long tons (2,744 t) at standard load and 3,420 long tons (3,470 t) at deep load. Their crews numbered 300 officers and enlisted men.

Each ship had two Kampon geared steam turbines, each driving one propeller shaft using steam provided by three Kampon water-tube boilers. The turbines were rated at a total of 52,000 shaft horsepower (38,776 kW) for a designed speed of 33 knots (61 km/h; 38 mph). The ships carried enough fuel oil to give them ranges of 8,300 nautical miles (15,400 km; 9,600 mi) at speeds of 18 knots (33 km/h; 21 mph).

The main armament of the Akizuki class consisted of eight 10 cm Type 98 dual-purpose guns in four twin-gun turrets, one superfiring pair fore and aft of the superstructure. Harutsuki was equipped with 41 Type 96 25-millimeter (1 in) anti-aircraft (AA) guns in seven triple-gun mounts and twenty single mounts. The ships were also each armed with four 610-millimeter (24 in) torpedo tubes in a single quadruple rotating mount amidships for Type 93 (Long Lance) torpedoes; one reload was carried for each tube. The later batches of ships were each equipped with two depth charge throwers and two sets of rails for which 72 depth charges were carried. Haratsuki was equipped with a Type 13 early-warning radar on her mainmast and a Type 22 surface-search radar on her foremast.

== Construction and career ==
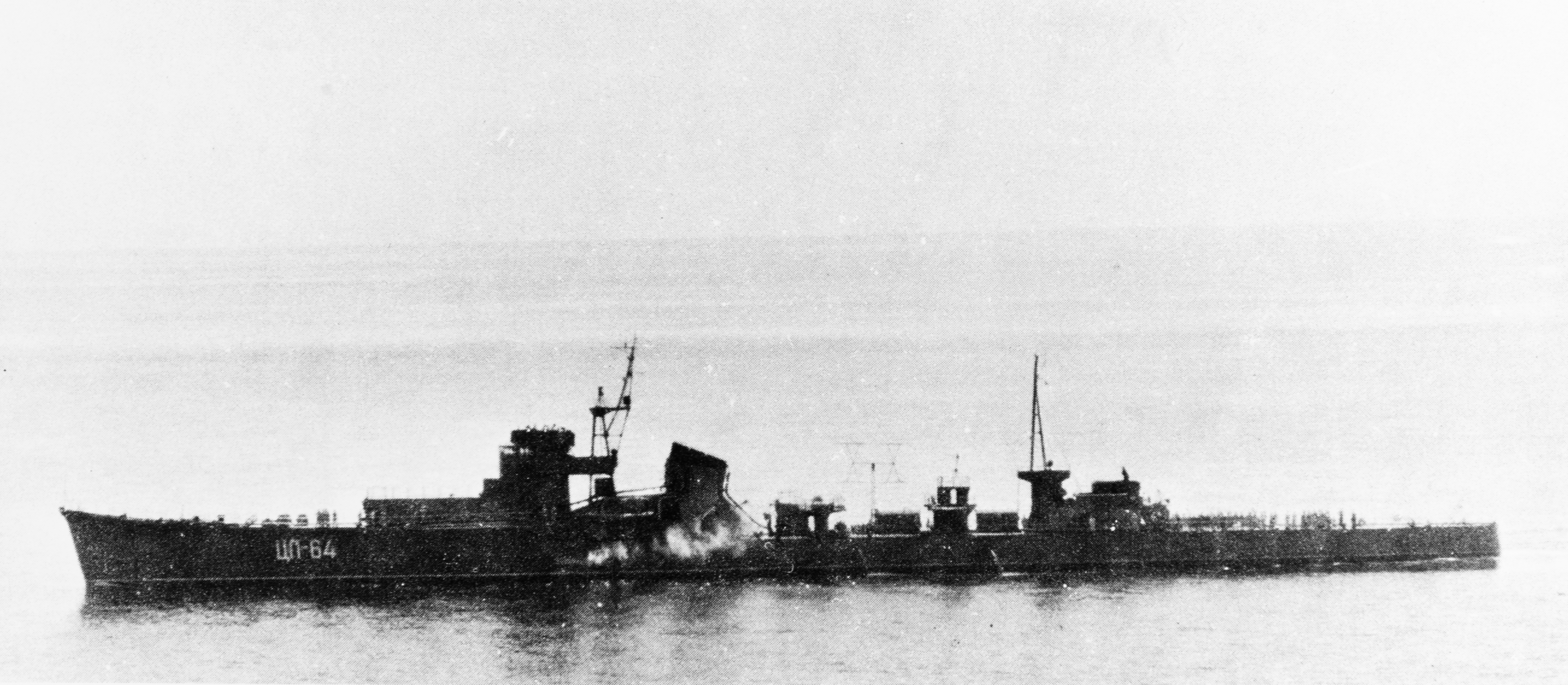
Soviet Union Navy's target ship TSL-64

On 5 October 1945, Harutsuki was removed from Navy List. On 28 August 1947, she was turned over to the Soviet Union, renamed Vnezapny (Внезапный) and rearmed with eight 102-millimeter (4 in) guns, fifteen 25 mm guns and four 533-millimeter (21 in) torpedo tubes. She became the training ship Oskol in 1949, target ship TsL-64 in 1955 and finally floating barracks PKZ-37, scrapped in 1969.
