= Japanese destroyer Natsuzuki =

Destroyer of the Imperial Japanese Navy

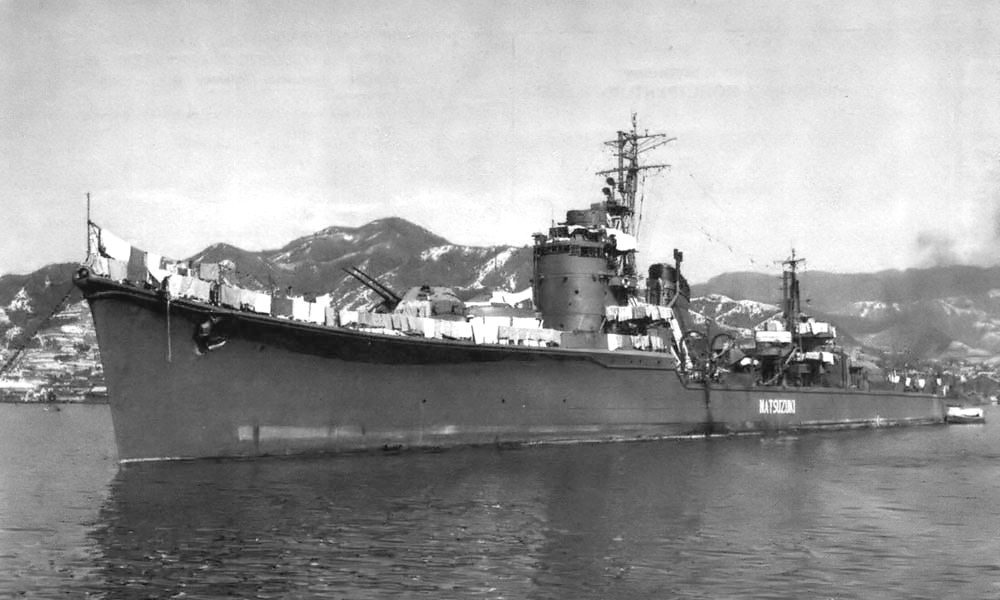
- Natsuzuki in late 1945

History

Empire of Japan
- Name: Natsuzuki
- Builder: Sasebo Naval Arsenal
- Laid down: 1 May 1944
- Launched: 2 December 1944
- Completed: 8 April 1945
- Stricken: 5 October 1945
- Fate: Transferred to the United Kingdom, 25 August 1947

United Kingdom
- Acquired: 25 August 1947
- Fate: scrapped, 1 March 1948

General characteristics
- Class & type: Akizuki-class destroyer
- Displacement: 2,701 long tons (2,744 t) (standard)
- Length: 134.2 m (440 ft 3 in)
- Beam: 11.6 m (38 ft 1 in)
- Draft: 4.15 m (13 ft 7 in)
- Installed power: 3 × water-tube boilers; 52,000 shp (38,776 kW)
- Propulsion: 2 × shafts; 2 × geared steam turbines
- Speed: 33 knots (61 km/h; 38 mph)
- Range: 8,300 nmi (15,400 km; 9,600 mi) at 18 knots (33 km/h; 21 mph)
- Complement: 300
- Sensors & processing systems: Type 13 early-warning radar; Type 22 surface-search radar
- Armament: 4 × twin 100 mm (3.9 in) DP guns; 7 × triple and 20 × single 25 mm (1 in) AA guns; 1 × quadruple 610 mm (24 in) torpedo tubes; 2 × depth charge throwers and 2 sets of rails; 72 × depth charges

Natsuzuki (夏月; "Summer Moon") was an Akizuki-class destroyer of the Imperial Japanese Navy (IJN) during the final stages of World War II. The ship was armed with eight 10-centimetre (3.9 in) dual-purpose guns. Completed in early 1945, the ship never left home waters. She was surrendered to the Allies at the end of the war and used to repatriate Japanese troops until 1947. Mid-year, the destroyer was turned over to Great Britain and was scrapped in early 1948.

== Design and description ==
The Akizuki-class ships were originally designed as anti-aircraft escorts for carrier battle groups, but were modified with torpedo tubes and depth charges to meet the need for more general-purpose destroyers. The ships measured 134.2 meters (440 ft 3 in) overall, with beams of 11.6 meters (38 ft 1 in) and drafts of 4.15 meters (13 ft 7 in). They displaced 2,701 long tons (2,744 t) at standard load and 3,420 long tons (3,470 t) at deep load. Their crews numbered 300 officers and enlisted men.

Each ship had two Kampon geared steam turbines, each driving one propeller shaft using steam provided by three Kampon water-tube boilers. The turbines were rated at a total of 52,000 shaft horsepower (38,776 kW) for a designed speed of 33 knots (61 km/h; 38 mph). The ships carried enough fuel oil to give them ranges of 8,300 nautical miles (15,400 km; 9,600 mi) at speeds of 18 knots (33 km/h; 21 mph).

The main armament of the Akizuki class consisted of eight 10 cm Type 98 dual-purpose guns in four twin-gun turrets, one superfiring pair fore and aft of the superstructure. Natsuzuki was equipped with 41 Type 96 25-millimeter (1 in) anti-aircraft (AA) guns in seven triple-gun mounts and twenty single mounts. The ships were also each armed with four 610-millimeter (24 in) torpedo tubes in a single quadruple rotating mount amidships for Type 93 (Long Lance) torpedoes; one reload was carried for each tube. The later batches of ships were each equipped with two depth charge throwers and two sets of rails for which 72 depth charges were carried. Natsuzuki was equipped with a Type 13 early-warning radar on her mainmast and a Type 22 surface-search radar on her foremast.

== Construction and career ==
Being one of the second batch of Akizuki-class destroyers authorized in the 1941 Rapid Naval Armaments Program, Natsuzuki was laid down on 1 May 1944 at the Sasebo Naval Arsenal and launched on 2 December. Completed on 8 April 1945, She was assigned to Destroyer Squadron 11 of the Second Fleet for training that same day. The squadron was transferred to the Combined Fleet on 20 April. The destroyer was reassigned to Destroyer Division 41 of Escort Squadron 31 on 25 May. Natsuzuki was badly damaged when she struck a naval mine on 16 June; the ship was repaired at Sasebo Naval Arsenal.

The ship was turned over to Allied forces at Moji at the time of the surrender of Japan on 2 September and was stricken from the navy list on 5 October. Natsuzuki was subsequently disarmed and used to repatriate Japanese troops from abroad. On 25 August 1947, she was turned over to Great Britain and was scrapped by the Uraga Dock Company at their facility in Uraga, Kanagawa, beginning on 1 March 1948.
