= Hanazuki =

Hanazuki may refer to:

- Japanese destroyer Hanazuki (花月)
- Hanazuki, a toy line and media franchise by Hasbro, based on the characters and concepts developed by Hanneke Metselaar and Niko Stumpo
  - Hanazuki: Full of Treasures, American animated series by Hasbro Studios
