= Japanese destroyer Fuyutsuki =

Akizuki-class destroyer

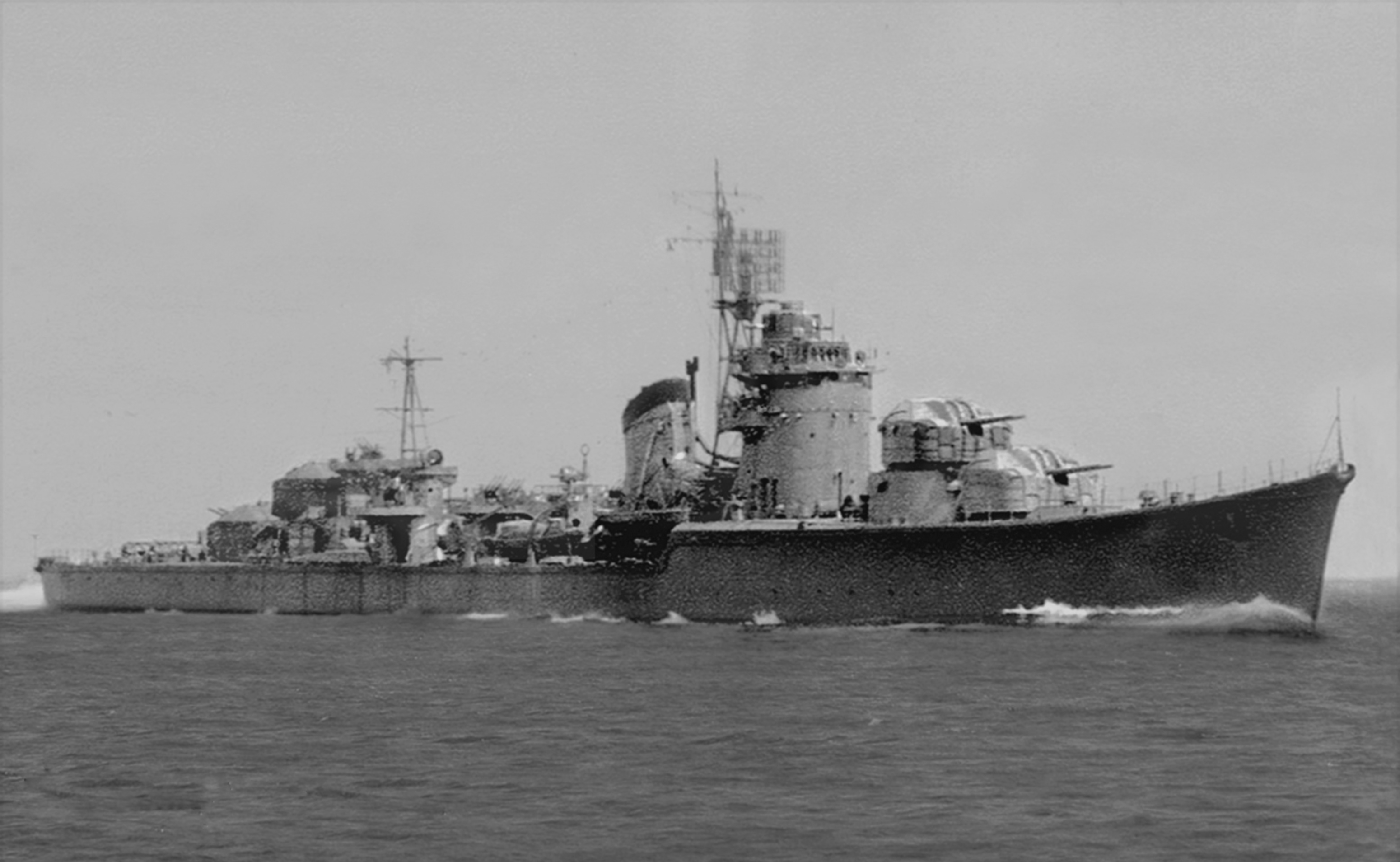
- Fuyutsuki, 23 May 1944

History

Empire of Japan
- Name: Fuyutsuki
- Ordered: 1942
- Builder: Maizuru Naval Arsenal
- Cost: 17,820,400 JPY (as naval budget)
- Laid down: 8 May 1943
- Launched: 20 January 1944
- Completed: 25 May 1944
- Commissioned: 25 May 1944
- Reclassified: 4th Class Reserve Ship in September 1945; As repair ship/minesweeper tender on 20 November 1945
- Stricken: 20 November 1945
- Home port: Yokosuka
- Fate: Used as breakwater in May 1948

General characteristics
- Class & type: Akizuki-class destroyer
- Displacement: 2,700 long tons (2,743 t) standard; 3,700 long tons (3,759 t) full load
- Length: 134.2 m (440 ft 3 in)
- Beam: 11.6 m (38 ft 1 in)
- Draft: 4.15 m (13 ft 7 in)
- Propulsion: 4 × Kampon type boilers; 2 × Parsons geared turbines; 2 × shafts, 50,000 shp (37 MW)
- Speed: 33 knots (38 mph; 61 km/h)
- Range: 8,300 nmi (15,400 km) at 18 kn (21 mph; 33 km/h)
- Complement: 300
- Armament: 8 × 100 mm (4 in)/65 cal Type 98 DP guns; 33 × Type 96 25 mm (0.98 in) AA guns; 4 × 610 mm (24 in) torpedo tubes for Type 93 torpedoes; 72 × depth charges

Fuyutsuki (冬月, "Winter Moon") was an Akizuki-class destroyer of the Imperial Japanese Navy. Her name means "Winter Moon".

== Design and description ==
The Akizuki-class ships were originally designed as anti-aircraft escorts for carrier battle groups, but were modified with torpedo tubes and depth charges to meet the need for more general-purpose destroyers. The ships measured 134.2 meters (440 ft 3 in) overall, with beams of 11.6 meters (38 ft 1 in) and drafts of 4.15 meters (13 ft 7 in). They displaced 2,701 long tons (2,744 t) at standard load and 3,420 long tons (3,470 t) at deep load. Their crews numbered 300 officers and enlisted men.

Each ship had two Kampon geared steam turbines, each driving one propeller shaft using steam provided by three Kampon water-tube boilers. The turbines were rated at a total of 52,000 shaft horsepower (38,776 kW) for a designed speed of 33 knots (61 km/h; 38 mph). The ships carried enough fuel oil to give them ranges of 8,300 nautical miles (15,400 km; 9,600 mi) at speeds of 18 knots (33 km/h; 21 mph).

The main armament of the Akizuki class consisted of eight 10 cm Type 98 dual-purpose guns in four twin-gun turrets, one superfiring pair fore and aft of the superstructure. Fuyutsuki was equipped with 41 Type 96 25-millimeter (1 in) anti-aircraft (AA) guns in seven triple-gun mounts and twenty single mounts. The ships were also each armed with four 610-millimeter (24 in) torpedo tubes in a single quadruple rotating mount amidships for Type 93 (Long Lance) torpedoes; one reload was carried for each tube. The later batches of ships were each equipped with two depth charge throwers and two sets of rails for which 72 depth charges were carried. Fuyutsuki was equipped with a Type 13 early-warning radar on her mainmast and a Type 22 surface-search radar on her foremast.

== Construction and career ==
On 25 May 1944, Fuyutsuki was completed at Maizuru Naval Arsenal, and she was assigned to the 11th Destroyer Squadron, Combined Fleet.

On 24 June, she sailed to Yokosuka with Landing Ship No. 4 and Landing Ship No. 104. On 25 June, she escorted the I-Gō Transport Squadron, on 29 June, she was deployed to Chichi-jima with the cruiser Nagara and destroyer Matsu. They returned to Yokosuka on 3 July.

On 11 July, she sailed to Tokuyama with the destroyer Kiyoshimo. On 14 July, she joined the Ro-Gō Transport Squadron, and sailed to Nakagusuku Bay. On 15 July, she was assigned to the 41st Destroyer Division, 10th Division, 3rd Fleet with the destroyer Shimotsuki. Fuyutsuki returned to Kure on 26 July.

On 12 October, while escorting the light cruiser Ōyodo from Yokosuka to the Inland Sea, she was hit in the bow by a torpedo fired from the submarine USS Trepang. She returned to Kure where she was repaired.

On 31 January 1945 she ran aground on a sandbar near Ōita during a training mission in the Inland Sea.

Fuyutsuki participated on the last mission of the battleship Yamato (6–7 April 1945). Afterwards, she sank the crippled destroyer Kasumi with two torpedoes after taking aboard the latter's crew. She was one of the few surviving Japanese ships, even though lightly damaged by 127 mm rockets and bombs. Her own losses were 12 dead and 12 injured.

On 20 August 1945, Fuyutsuki hit a mine at Moji, Kyūshū, suffering heavy damage to her stern. She surrendered unrepaired and without armament.

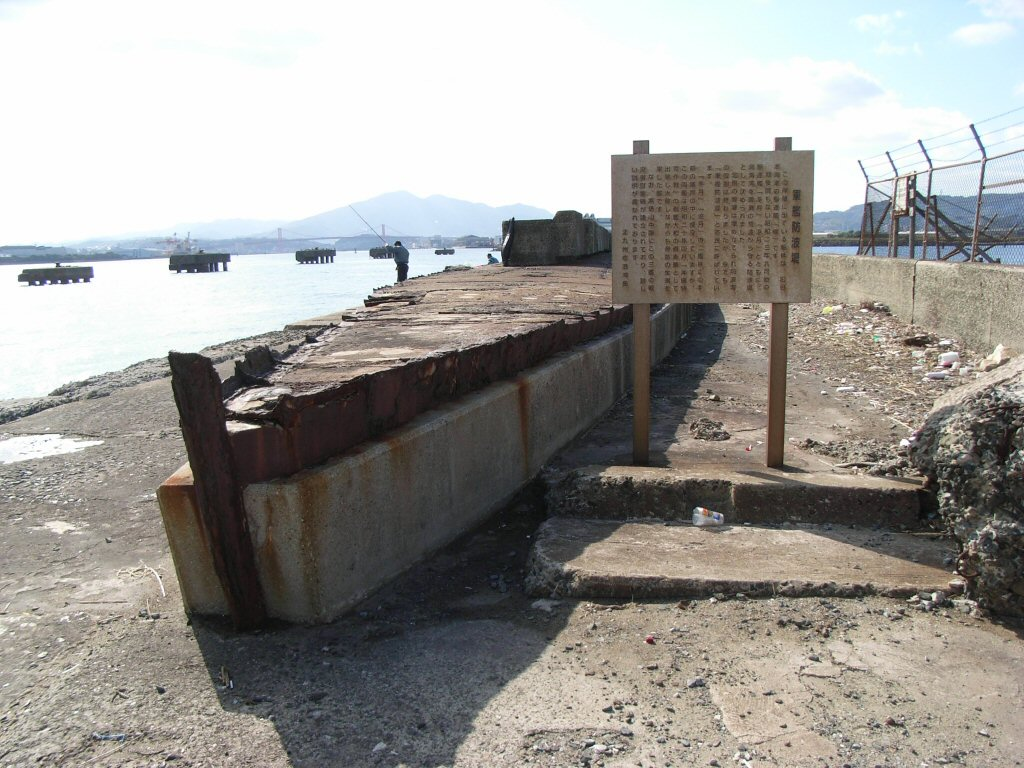
Yanagi's hull, with a sign describing the breakwater history, with Suzutsuki and Fuyutsuki buried in front of it.

She was later used as a breakwater in May 1948 in Wakamatsu-ku, alongside Suzutsuki and Yanagi.
