= Japanese destroyer Hanazuki =

Destroyer of the Imperial Japanese Navy

Coordinates: 35°30′N 122°49′E

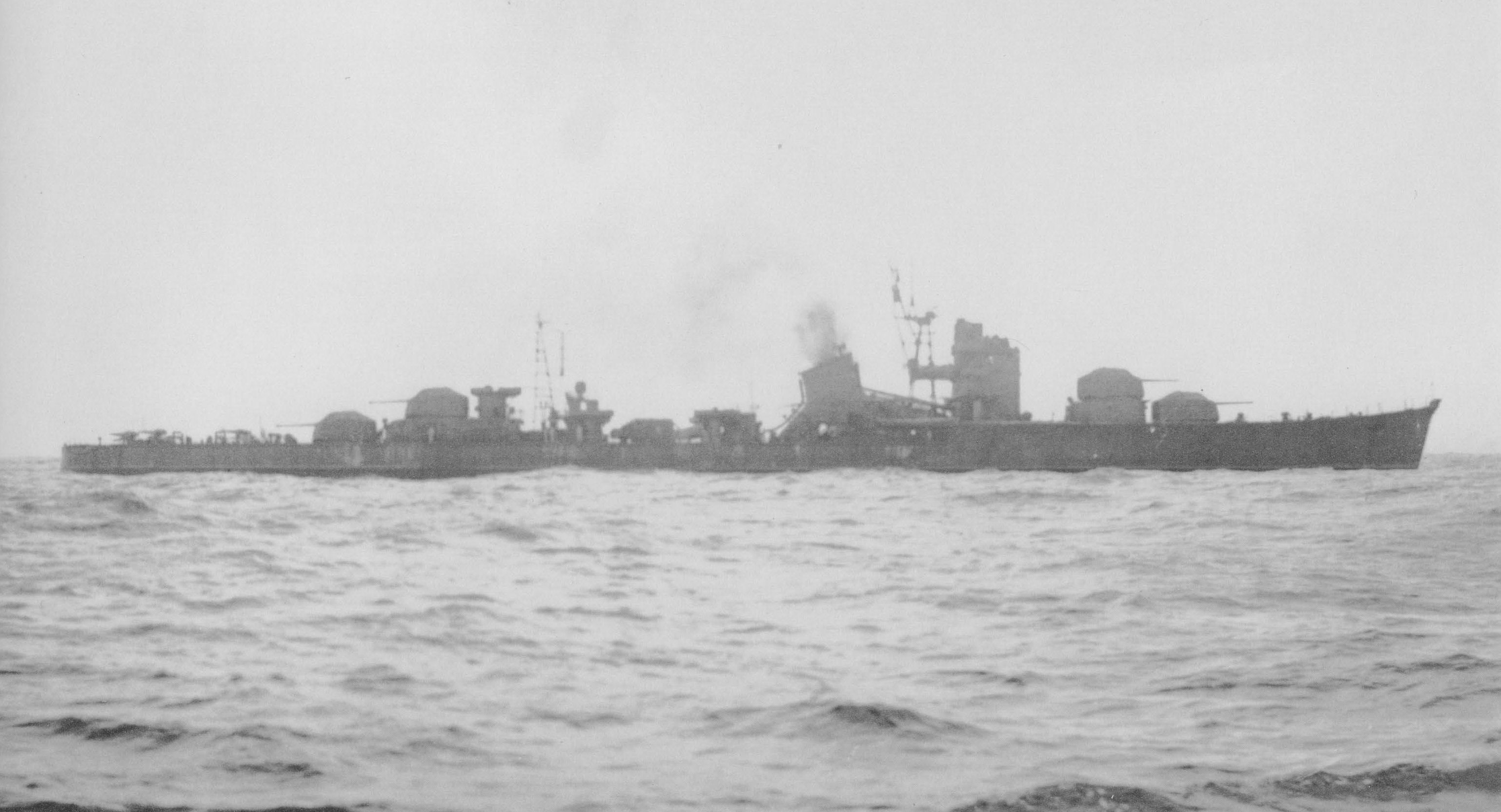
- Hanazuki underway, 18 December 1944

History

Empire of Japan
- Name: Hanazuki
- Builder: Maizuru Naval Arsenal
- Laid down: 10 February 1944
- Launched: 10 October 1944
- Completed: 26 December 1944
- Commissioned: 26 December 1944
- Stricken: 5 October 1945
- Fate: Sunk as target off Gotō Islands, Japan, 3 February 1948

General characteristics
- Class & type: Akizuki-class destroyer
- Displacement: 2,700 long tons (2,743 t) standard; 3,700 long tons (3,759 t) full load
- Length: 134.2 m (440 ft 3 in)
- Beam: 11.6 m (38 ft 1 in)
- Draft: 4.15 m (13 ft 7 in)
- Propulsion: 4 × Kampon type boilers; 2 × Kampon geared turbines; 2 × shafts, 50,000 shp (37 MW)
- Speed: 33 knots (38 mph; 61 km/h)
- Range: 8,300 nmi (15,400 km) at 18 kn (21 mph; 33 km/h)
- Complement: 300
- Armament: 8 × 100 mm (4 in)/65 cal Type 98 DP guns; 37 × Type 96 25 mm (0.98 in) AA guns; 4 × 13.2 mm (0.52 in) AA guns; 4 × 610 mm (24 in) torpedo tubes; 8 × Type 93 torpedoes; 72 × Type 95 depth charges

Hanazuki (花月) was an Akizuki-class destroyer of the Imperial Japanese Navy. Her name translates as "flower (sakura) moon", or an alternate name for "March".

== Design and description ==
The Akizuki-class ships were originally designed as anti-aircraft escorts for carrier battle groups, but were modified with torpedo tubes and depth charges to meet the need for more general-purpose destroyers. The ships measured 134.2 meters (440 ft 3 in) overall, with beams of 11.6 meters (38 ft 1 in) and drafts of 4.15 meters (13 ft 7 in). They displaced 2,701 long tons (2,744 t) at standard load and 3,420 long tons (3,470 t) at deep load. Their crews numbered 300 officers and enlisted men.

Each ship had two Kampon geared steam turbines, each driving one propeller shaft using steam provided by three Kampon water-tube boilers. The turbines were rated at a total of 52,000 shaft horsepower (38,776 kW) for a designed speed of 33 knots (61 km/h; 38 mph). The ships carried enough fuel oil to give them ranges of 8,300 nautical miles (15,400 km; 9,600 mi) at speeds of 18 knots (33 km/h; 21 mph).

The main armament of the Akizuki class consisted of eight 10 cm Type 98 dual-purpose guns in four twin-gun turrets, one superfiring pair fore and aft of the superstructure. Hanazuki was equipped with 41 Type 96 25-millimeter (1 in) anti-aircraft (AA) guns in seven triple-gun mounts and twenty single mounts. The ships were also each armed with four 610-millimeter (24 in) torpedo tubes in a single quadruple rotating mount amidships for Type 93 (Long Lance) torpedoes; one reload was carried for each tube. The later batches of ships were each equipped with two depth charge throwers and two sets of rails for which 72 depth charges were carried. Hanazuki was equipped with a Type 13 early-warning radar on her mainmast and a Type 22 surface-search radar on her foremast.

== Construction and career ==
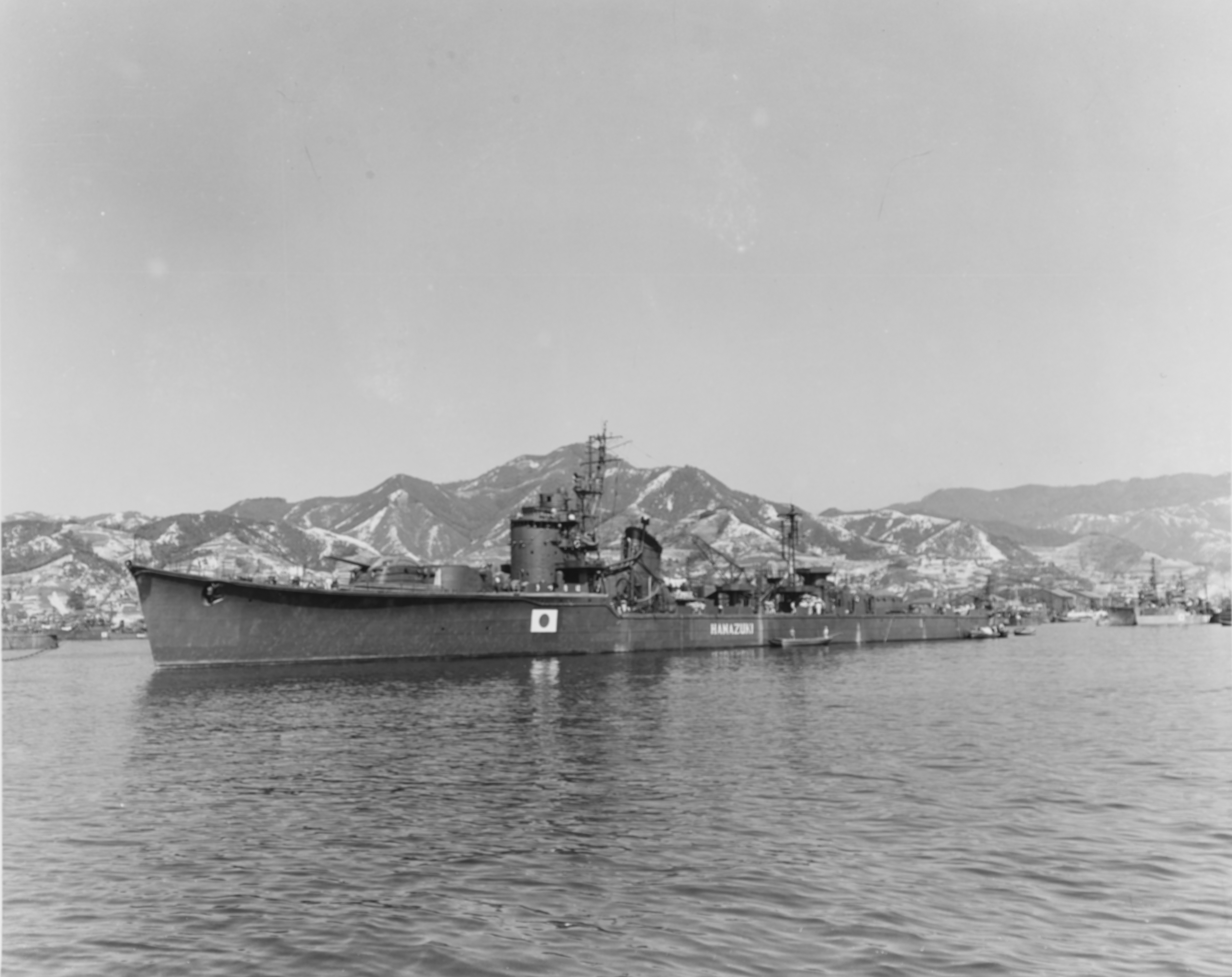
Hanazuki at Kure after the surrender of Japan, 16 October 1945

In June 1947, Hanazuki was turned over to United States as "DD-934", and was later sunk as target off Gotō Islands, Japan on 3 February 1948.
