= Japanese destroyer Akizuki (1941) =

Akizuki-class destroyer

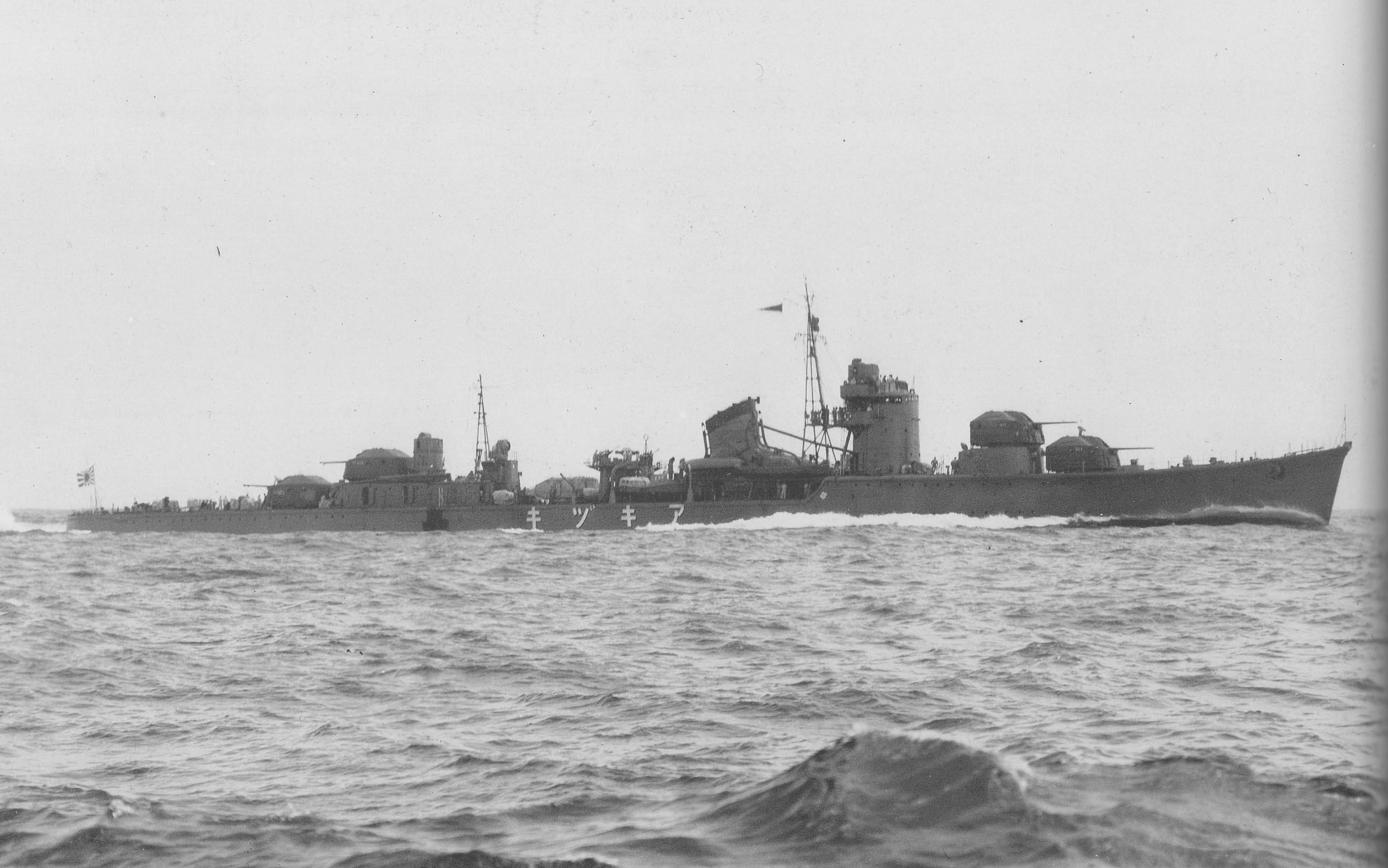
- Akizuki on trial run off Miyazu Bay on 17 May 1942.

History

Empire of Japan
- Name: Akizuki
- Builder: Maizuru Naval Arsenal
- Laid down: 30 July 1940
- Launched: 2 July 1941
- Completed: 11 June 1942
- Commissioned: 11 June 1942, Yokosuka Chinjufu
- Stricken: 10 December 1944
- Fate: Sunk in action 25 October 1944

General characteristics
- Class & type: Akizuki-class destroyer
- Displacement: 2,700 long tons (2,743 t) standard; 3,700 long tons (3,759 t) full load
- Length: 134.2 m (440 ft 3 in)
- Beam: 11.6 m (38 ft 1 in)
- Draft: 4.15 m (13 ft 7 in)
- Propulsion: 4 × Kampon type boilers; 2 × Parsons geared turbines; 2 × shafts, 50,000 shp (37 MW)
- Speed: 33 knots (38 mph; 61 km/h)
- Range: 8,300 nmi (15,400 km) at 18 kn (21 mph; 33 km/h)
- Complement: 263
- Armament: June 1942 : 8 × 100 mm (4 in)/65 cal Type 98 DP guns; 4 × Type 96 25 mm (0.98 in) AA guns; 4 × 610 mm (24 in) torpedo tubes; 8 × Type 93 torpedoes; 56 × Type 95 depth charges; October 1944 : 8 × 100 mm (4 in)/65 cal DP guns; 35 × 25 mm AA guns; 4 × 13 mm AA guns; 4 × 610 mm (24 in) torpedo tubes; 8 × Type 93 torpedoes; 56 × Type 95 depth charges

Akizuki (秋月; "Autumn Moon") was the lead ship of her class of destroyer in the Imperial Japanese Navy.

== Design and description ==
The Akizuki-class ships were originally designed as anti-aircraft escorts for carrier battle groups, but were modified with torpedo tubes and depth charges to meet the need for more general-purpose destroyers. The ships measured 134.2 meters (440 ft 3 in) overall, with beams of 11.6 meters (38 ft 1 in) and drafts of 4.15 meters (13 ft 7 in). They displaced 2,701 long tons (2,744 t) at standard load and 3,420 long tons (3,470 t) at deep load. Their crews numbered 300 officers and enlisted men.

Each ship had two Kampon geared steam turbines, each driving one propeller shaft using steam provided by three Kampon water-tube boilers. The turbines were rated at a total of 52,000 shaft horsepower (38,776 kW) for a designed speed of 33 knots (61 km/h; 38 mph). The ships carried enough fuel oil to give them ranges of 8,300 nautical miles (15,400 km; 9,600 mi) at speeds of 18 knots (33 km/h; 21 mph).

The main armament of the Akizuki class consisted of eight 100-millimeter (3.9 in) Type 98 dual-purpose guns in four twin-gun turrets, two superfiring pairs fore and aft of the superstructure. They each carried four 25-millimeter (1 in) Type 96 anti-aircraft (AA) guns in two twin-gun mounts. The ships were also each armed with four 610-millimeter (24 in) torpedo tubes in a single quadruple rotating mount amidships for Type 93 (Long Lance) torpedoes; one reload was carried for each tube. The first batch of ships were each equipped with two depth charge throwers for which 54 depth charges were carried.

== Construction and career ==
Akizuki was completed on 11 June 1942. She participated in the Battle of the Eastern Solomons on 24 August 1942 and sustained no damage. She participated in the Guadalcanal Campaign as well, helping to guard transports before sustaining a bomb hit and several near misses on October 25 which killed 11 and injured 22 of her crew, and slowed her to 23 knots. She returned to Japan and was repaired from 8 November to 16 December 1942.

On 19 January 1943, she was torpedoed by USS Nautilus, which flooded a boiler room and her starboard engine room, killing 14 and injuring 64. She was able to steam at 20 knots, and had to resort to emergency steering. She returned to Truk and had to spend from February 2 to 11 March alongside the repair ship Akashi. As she was preparing to return to Japan, however, her bow started sagging and, fearing it was about to break off, she had to be beached at Saipan.

She was cut in half and the bridge and forward turrets were removed to lighten ship and replaced with a temporary "wave-cutter" bow. A temporary bridge was constructed behind the mainmast. She was repaired from July to October, receiving the bow from her incomplete sister ship, Shimotsuki. She participated in the Battle of the Philippine Sea, helping rescue survivors from Taiho and help protect Zuikaku from air attack.

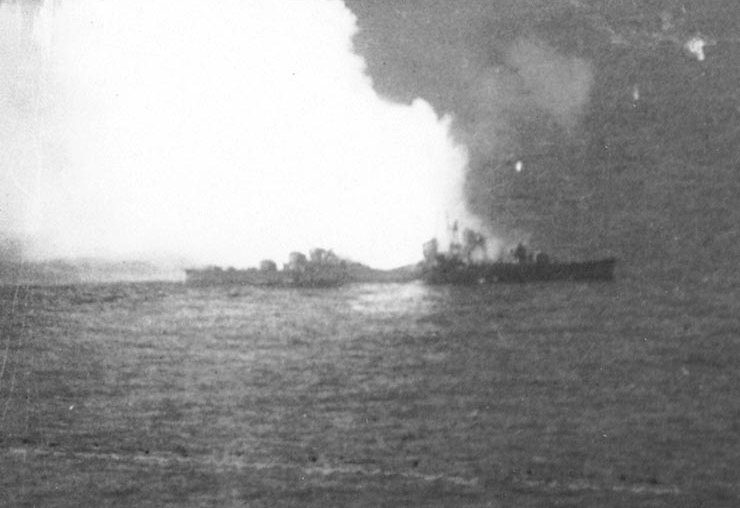
Akizuki explodes during the Battle off Cape Engaño

In October 1944 Akizuki was part of the Northern Force commanded by Vice Admiral Jisaburo Ozawa, in the Japanese attack on the Allied forces supporting the invasion of Leyte. On 25 October, in the Battle off Cape Engaño, the ship was sunk, probably by torpedo, east-northeast of Cape Engaño (20°29′N 126°30′E), during the initial U.S. air attack on the Northern Force. Most sources credit the hit to aircraft of Task Force 38, but some give credit to the submarine USS Halibut.

== Bibliography ==
- Jentschura, Hansgeorg; Jung, Dieter & Mickel, Peter (1977). Warships of the Imperial Japanese Navy, 1869–1945. Annapolis, Maryland: United States Naval Institute. ISBN 0-87021-893-X.
- Nevitt, Allyn D. (1998). "IJN Akizuki: Tabular Record of Movement" (Web page). CombinedFleet.com.
- Rohwer, Jürgen (2005). Chronology of the War at Sea 1939–1945: The Naval History of World War Two (Third Revised ed.). Annapolis, Maryland: Naval Institute Press. ISBN 1-59114-119-2.
- Stille, Mark (2013). Imperial Japanese Navy Destroyers 1919–45 (2): Asahio to Tachibana Classes. Botley, UK: Osprey Publishing. ISBN 978-1-84908-987-6.* Sturton, Ian (1980). "Japan". In Chesneau, Roger (ed.). Conway's All the World's Fighting Ships 1922–1946. Greenwich, UK: Conway Maritime Press. ISBN 0-85177-146-7.
- Todaka, Kazushige, ed. (2020). Destroyers: Selected Photos from the Archives of the Kure Maritime Museum; the Best from the Collection of Shizuo Fukui's Photos of Japanese Warships. Japanese Naval Warship Photo Album. Annapolis, Maryland: Naval Institute Press. ISBN 978-1-59114-630-8.
- Watts, Anthony J. (1971). The Imperial Japanese Navy. Doubleday. ISBN 0-385-01268-3.
- Whitley, M. J. (2000). Destroyers of World War Two: An International Encyclopedia. London: Cassell & Co. ISBN 1-85409-521-8.
