= Akizuki-class destroyer (1942) =

Destroyer class of the Imperial Japanese Navy

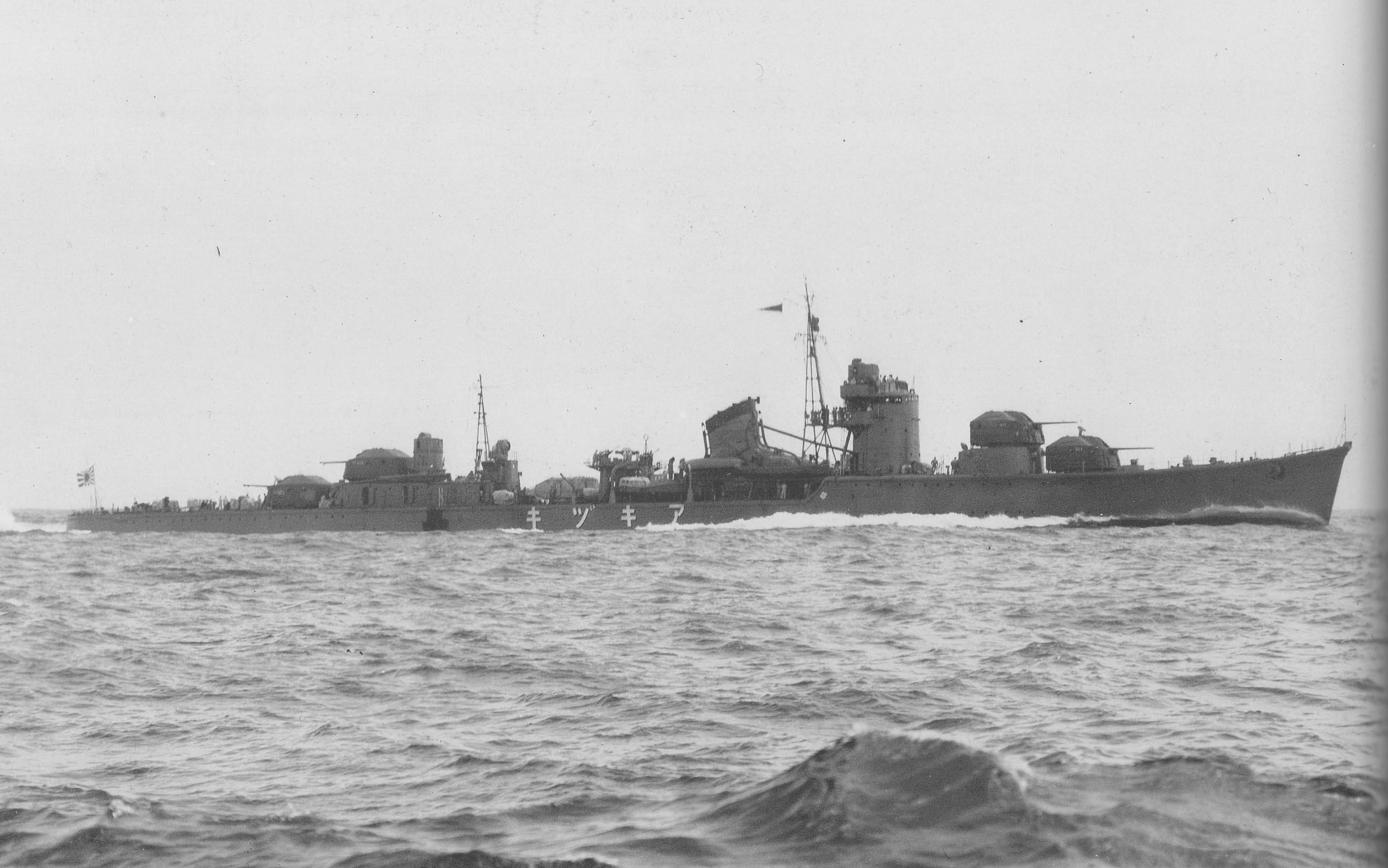
- Akizuki on trial run off Miyazu Bay on 17 May 1942.

Class overview
- Name: Akizuki class
- Builders: Mitsubishi Heavy Industries; Nagasaki Shipyard (5); Maizuru Naval Arsenal (4); Sasebo Naval Arsenal (2); Uraga Dock Company (1)
- Operators: Imperial Japanese Navy; Republic of China Navy; Soviet Navy
- Preceded by: Yūgumo class
- Succeeded by: Matsu class
- Subclasses: Akizuki class (Pr. F51); Fuyutsuki class (Pr. F51); Michitsuki class (Pr. F53)
- Built: 1940–1945
- In commission: 1942–1945 (IJN)
- Planned: 6 (1939) + 10 (1941) + 23 (1942)
- Completed: 12
- Cancelled: 20
- Lost: 6
- Retired: 6

General characteristics (as per Whitley)
- Type: Destroyer
- Displacement: 2,700 long tons (2,743 t) (standard)
- Length: 134.2 m (440 ft 3 in) (o/a)
- Beam: 11.6 m (38 ft 1 in)
- Draught: 4.15 m (13 ft 7 in)
- Installed power: 3 × water-tube boilers; 52,000 shp (38,776 kW)
- Propulsion: 2 shafts; 2 × geared steam turbines
- Speed: 33 knots (61 km/h; 38 mph)
- Range: 8,000 nmi (15,000 km; 9,200 mi) at 18 knots (33 km/h; 21 mph)
- Complement: 263 (Akizuki in 1942); 315 (Akizuki in October 1944)
- Armament: Akizuki in 1942; 4 × twin 100 mm (3.9 in) DP guns; 2 × twin 25 mm (1 in) AA guns; 1 × quadruple 610 mm (24 in) torpedo tubes; 56 × depth charges; Suzutsuki in April 1945; 4 × twin 100 mm (3.9 in) DP guns; 7 × triple, 26 × single 25 mm (1 in) AA guns; 3 × single 13 mm (0.51 in) AA guns; 1 × quadruple 610 mm torpedo tubes; 56 × depth charges

The Akizuki-class destroyer (秋月型駆逐艦, Akizuki-gata Kuchikukan) was a class of destroyers of the Imperial Japanese Navy (IJN) built during World War II to complement the Kagerō class, primarily for the role of anti-aircraft screening for carrier battle groups. The class was also designated the Type-B Destroyer (乙型駆逐艦, Otsu-gata Kuchikukan), from their plan name. During the war, the class proved to be a very capable multipurpose platform and was well regarded in the IJN.

== Design and description ==
The Akizuki class was built using the newly developed Type 98 dual-purpose guns in four twin mounts as its main battery. The four turrets were placed in pairs fore and aft, with the middle positions located in a superfiring position. Unlike the larger weapons mounted by the preceding Kagerō class, these were true dual-purpose guns reloadable at any elevation and with a high reliability, rate of fire and range. It was intended that each vessel be fitted with two Type 94 fire-control directors capable of targeting high-angle targets, to be mounted above the bridge and in a small deckhouse near the aft mount: however, due to production shortages, the last five vessels in the class never received their second Type 94, and eventually it was removed from the aft position on all ships, and that location used for a triple Type 96 AA gun mount. Two twin-mount Type 96s were also located amidships.

Before the design was finalized, the Imperial Japanese Navy General Staff Office intervened, and insisted on the addition of a centerline-mounted Type 92 quadruple torpedo launcher with reloads, firing the Type 93 "Long Lance" torpedo. The class also carried two Type 94 depth charge projectors and 54 depth charges. These were increased to 72 depth charges for some of the later production vessels.

The hull was 50 feet longer, and the displacement was 700 tons larger than the preceding Kagerō class. Propulsion was provided by two Kampon geared steam turbines, each driving a single propeller shaft using steam provided by three Kampon water-tube boilers. The turbines were rated at a total of 52,000 shaft horsepower (39,000 kW) for a design speed of 33 knots (61 km/h; 38 mph). Unlike previous Japanese destroyer designs, there were two separate engine and boiler rooms for increased survivability in battle.

The Akizuki class also were among the first Japanese destroyers equipped with the Type 21 air-search radar, which was mounted on all but the Akizuki and Teruzuki. Ships surviving to 1944 also received the Type 13 radar, and the last five vessels in the class had the Type 21 replaced by the new Type 22 radar, and an additional Type 13 added to their electronics suite.

In terms of anti-aircraft capability, as the war progressed, the number of Type 96 guns were gradually increased. In 1942–1943, the twin mounts were replaced by triple mounts, and another two triple mounts were added abreast the smokestack. In late 1944 to early 1945, surviving members of the class received another triple mount abreast the bridge, and up to 24 more single mounts were added to various locations, giving each vessel a total of 41 guns.

Six of this class were authorized in 1939 Maru 4 Programme and another ten in the 1941 Maru Kyū Programme. Only one of the last four was even laid down before all were canceled. Later units of the Fuyutsuki and Michitsuki subclasses were completed to a simplified hull shape to decrease production time.

Another slightly larger group of 16 ships to an improved design of 2,933 tons was authorized in the 1942 Additional Naval Armaments Supplement Programme (as #770 to #785). This Programme was later subsumed into the Modified 5th Naval Armaments Supplement Programme with a total of 23 ships (vice 16) of 2,701 tons planned to follow (as #5061 to #5083). All of these were canceled before construction started.

== Ships in classes ==
=== Akizuki class ===
Project number F51. General production type of the Akizuki class. Seven vessels were built under the Maru 4 Programme (Ship # 104–109) and the Maru Kyū Programme (Ship # 360).

List of Akizuki-class destroyers
Ship #	Ship name	Kanji	Builder	Laid down	Launched	Completed	Fate
104	Akizuki	秋月	Maizuru Naval Arsenal	30 June 1940	2 July 1941	11 June 1942	Sunk during the Battle off Cape Engaño on 25 October 1944. Removed from navy list on 10 December 1944.
105	Teruzuki	照月	Mitsubishi-Nagasaki Shipyard	13 November 1940	21 November 1941	31 August 1942	Heavily damaged by USS PT-37 and PT-40 off Savo Island on 11 December 1942. Scuttled on 12 December 1942. Removed from navy list on 20 January 1943.
106	Suzutsuki	涼月	Mitsubishi-Nagasaki Shipyard	15 March 1941	3 March 1942	29 December 1942	Survived war at Sasebo. Decommissioned on 20 November 1945. Converted to breakwater at Kitakyūshū in July 1948.
107	Hatsuzuki	初月	Maizuru Naval Arsenal	25 July 1941	3 April 1942	29 December 1942	Sunk during the Battle off Cape Engaño on 25 October 1944. Removed from navy list on 10 December 1944.
108	Niizuki	新月	Mitsubishi-Nagasaki Shipyard	8 December 1941	29 June 1942	31 March 1943	Sunk during the Battle of Kula Gulf on 6 July 1943. Removed from navy list on 10 September 1943.
109	Wakatsuki	若月	Mitsubishi-Nagasaki Shipyard	9 March 1942	24 November 1942	31 May 1943	Sunk during the Battle of Ormoc Bay on 11 November 1944. Removed from navy list on 10 January 1945.
360	Shimotsuki	霜月	Mitsubishi-Nagasaki Shipyard	6 July 1942	7 April 1943	31 March 1944	Sunk by USS Cavalla off Anambas Islands on 25 November 1944. Removed from navy list on 10 January 1945.

=== Fuyutsuki class ===
Project number F51. The Fuyutsuki subclass were originally going to be built to the same specifications as the Akizuki class but construction was simplified. Four vessels were built under the Maru Kyū Programme (Ship # 361–364). Main differences from the Akizuki class were simplified bow design, removed rear deck house, and fitted two-dimensional air inlet for boilers. However, the IJN was not satisfied with the design. More modifications were ordered, leading to the Michitsuki subclass.

List of Fuyutsuki-subclass destroyers
Ship #	Ship name	Kanji	Builder	Laid down	Launched	Completed	Fate
361	Fuyutsuki	冬月	Maizuru Naval Arsenal	8 May 1943	20 January 1944	25 May 1944	Survived war at Kitakyūshū. Decommissioned on 20 November 1945. Converted to breakwater at Kitakyūshū in July 1948.
362	Harutsuki	春月	Sasebo Naval Arsenal	23 December 1943	3 August 1944	28 December 1944	Survived war at Kure. Decommissioned on 5 October 1945. Surrendered to Soviet Union on 28 August 1947 and renamed Vnezapniy (Внезапный, lit. 'sudden').
363	Yoizuki	宵月	Uraga Dock Company	25 August 1943	25 September 1944	31 January 1945	Survived war at Nōmi. Decommissioned on 5 October 1945. Surrendered to Republic of China on 29 August 1947 and renamed Fen Yang. Scrapped in 1963.
364	Natsuzuki	夏月	Sasebo Naval Arsenal	1 May 1944	2 December 1944	8 April 1945	Survived war at Kitakyūshū. Decommissioned on 5 October 1945. Surrendered to United Kingdom on 25 August 1947. Sold and scrapped at Uraga in September 1947-March 1948.

=== Michitsuki class ===
Project number F53. Final production model of the Akizuki class. Simplified more than Fuyutsuki class. Comprised the remaining 5 vessels from the Maru Kyū Programme (Ship # 365–369) and 16 vessels from the Additional Naval Armaments Supplement Programme (Ship #770-785). As the 1941 Additional Naval Armaments Supplement Programme was replaced by the Maru 5 Programme, the 16 Michitsuki class were re-planned to #5061-5076, to which were added another 6 vessels of this design - #5077-5082. However, only 1 vessel was completed.

List of Michitsuki-subclass destroyers
Ship #	Ship name	Kanji	Builder	Laid down	Launched	Completed	Fate
365	Michitsuki	満月	Sasebo Naval Arsenal	3 January 1945			16% complete, construction stopped on 17 April 1945. Scrapped on 28 February 1948.
366	Hanazuki	花月	Maizuru Naval Arsenal	10 February 1944	10 October 1944	26 December 1944	Survived war at western Inland Sea. Decommissioned on 5 October 1945. Surrendered to United States on 29 August 1947 and renamed DD-934. Sunk as target off the Gotō Islands on 3 February 1948.
367	Kiyotsuki	清月	Maizuru Naval Arsenal	—N/a	—N/a	—N/a	Cancelled on 14 December 1944.
368	Ōtsuki	大月	Sasebo Naval Arsenal	—N/a	—N/a	—N/a	Cancelled on 14 December 1944.
369	Hazuki	葉月	Maizuru Naval Arsenal	—N/a	—N/a	—N/a	Cancelled on 14 December 1944.
5061	Yamazuki	山月	—N/a	—N/a	—N/a	—N/a	Cancelled on 14 December 1944.
5062	Urazuki	浦月	—N/a	—N/a	—N/a	—N/a	Cancelled on 14 December 1944.
5063	Aogumo	青雲	—N/a	—N/a	—N/a	—N/a	Cancelled on 14 December 1944.
5064	Benigumo	紅雲	—N/a	—N/a	—N/a	—N/a	Cancelled on 14 December 1944.
5065	Harugumo	春雲	—N/a	—N/a	—N/a	—N/a	Cancelled on 14 December 1944.
5066	Amagumo	天雲	—N/a	—N/a	—N/a	—N/a	Cancelled on 9 June 1944.
5067	Yaegumo	八重雲	—N/a	—N/a	—N/a	—N/a	Cancelled on 9 June 1944.
5068	Fuyugumo	冬雲	—N/a	—N/a	—N/a	—N/a	Cancelled on 9 June 1944.
5069	Yukigumo	雪雲	—N/a	—N/a	—N/a	—N/a	Cancelled on 9 June 1944.
5070	Okitsukaze	沖津風	—N/a	—N/a	—N/a	—N/a	Cancelled on 9 June 1944.
5071	Shimokaze	霜風	—N/a	—N/a	—N/a	—N/a	Cancelled on 9 June 1944.
5072	Asagochi	朝東風	—N/a	—N/a	—N/a	—N/a	Cancelled on 9 June 1944.
5073	Ōkaze	大風	—N/a	—N/a	—N/a	—N/a	Cancelled on 9 June 1944.
5074	Kochi	東風	—N/a	—N/a	—N/a	—N/a	Cancelled on 9 June 1944.
5075	Nishikaze	西風	—N/a	—N/a	—N/a	—N/a	Cancelled on 9 June 1944.
5076	Hae	南風	—N/a	—N/a	—N/a	—N/a	Cancelled on 9 June 1944.

== Operational history ==
The Akizuki class destroyers were the only major destroyer class in which every ship of the class was commissioned during World War II and was immediately sent into action.

Akizuki escorted aircraft carriers at the Battle of the Eastern Solomons on 24 August 1942. In September, she survived an air raid in Empress Augusta Bay, then was damaged during an air raid in October during the same attack that sank the light cruiser Yura.

Teruzuki escorted aircraft carriers during the Battle of the Santa Cruz Islands, where she was lightly damaged by bomb near misses, before taking part in the Naval Battle of Guadalcanal from 13 to 15 November. In the first battle, Teruzuki helped to sink the destroyer USS Cushing with gunfire, before she took part in an attack on the battleship USS South Dakota. She assisted the sinking battlecruiser Kirishima in the second battle. Just a month later, Teruzuki was attacked and sunk by the US PT boats PT-37 and PT-40, the first loss of the class.

The start of 1943 saw Akizuki crippled by a torpedo from the submarine USS Nautilus, forcing her into three months of repair, followed by a large number of troop and supply transport missions to support the Solomon Islands. In July, Niizuki was involved in the Battle of Kula Gulf, during which she torpedoed and sank the destroyer USS Strong at nearly 22,000 yards, but the next day was sunk by US cruiser gunfire with most of her crew. Later that November, Wakatsuki engaged a US cruiser-destroyer group at the Battle of Empress Augusta Bay, before surviving the bombing of Rabaul. With the start of 1944, Suzutsuki was hit by two torpedoes from the submarine USS Sturgeon which blew off both her bow and stern, but managed to stay afloat and was towed to repairs, which lasted until October, upon which she was immediately hit by another torpedo from the submarine USS Besugo which blew off her bow again, forcing her into another month of repairs. Simultaneously, Akizuki, Hatsuzuki, Wakatsuki, and Shimotsuki escorted aircraft carriers at the Battle off Cape Engaño, part of the overall Battle of Leyte Gulf, during which Akizuki was sunk by American torpedo bombers. Hatsuzuki meanwhile covered the other ships rescuing survivors and distracted a US cruiser group; she was sunk with the loss of most of her crew, but successfully covered the evacuating ships. Shortly afterwards, Fuyutsuki was damaged by a torpedo from the submarine USS Trepang, while in November, Wakatsuki was sunk by US carrier aircraft at the Battle of Ormoc Bay.

With the start of 1945, Shimotsuki was torpedoed and sunk by the submarine USS Cavalla. Several ships of the class were commissioned during this period, but never managed to leave port. In stark contrast, Suzutsuki and Fuyutsuki escorted battleship Yamato during Operation Ten-Go, in which they were attacked by 386 carrier aircraft. Suzutsuki was crippled by a torpedo hit which blew off her bow a third time, while Fuyutsuki was damaged by rocket hits. The six remaining ships of the class spent the rest of the war stuck in port without fuel. After the war, Suzutsuki and Fuyutsuki were scuttled as breakwater ships, Natsuzuki was scrapped by the UK, Hanazuki was sunk as a target ship by the US, while Yoizuki and Harutsuki were sold to the Chinese and Russian navies, respectively, as training ships, later to be scrapped in the 1960s.

== Gallery ==
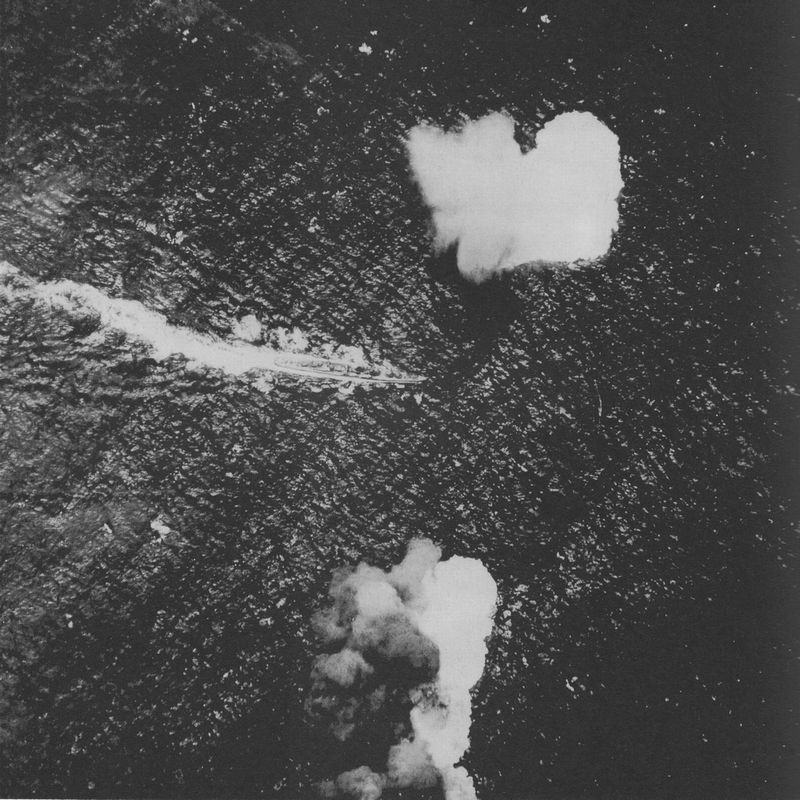
Akizuki

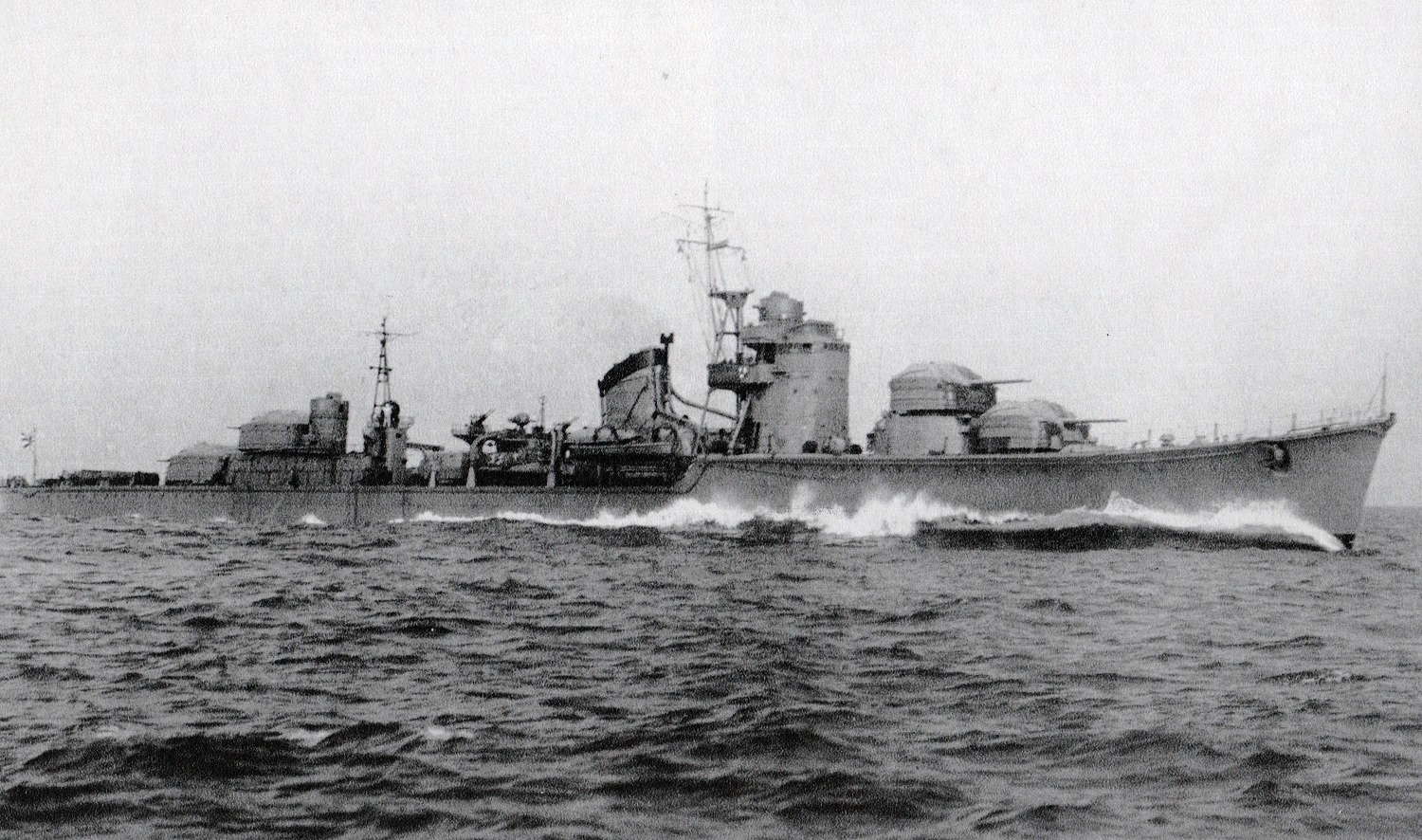
Hatsuzuki

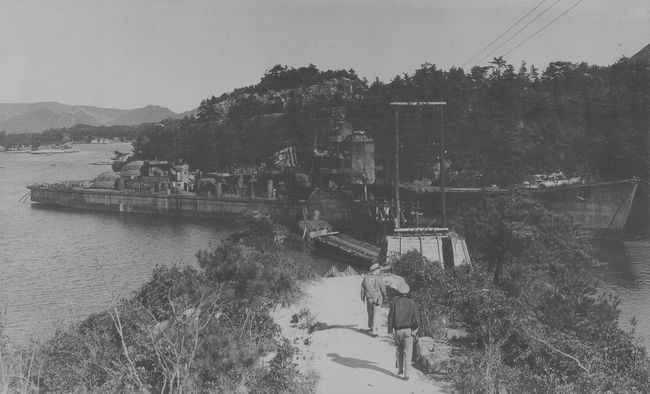
Suzutsuki

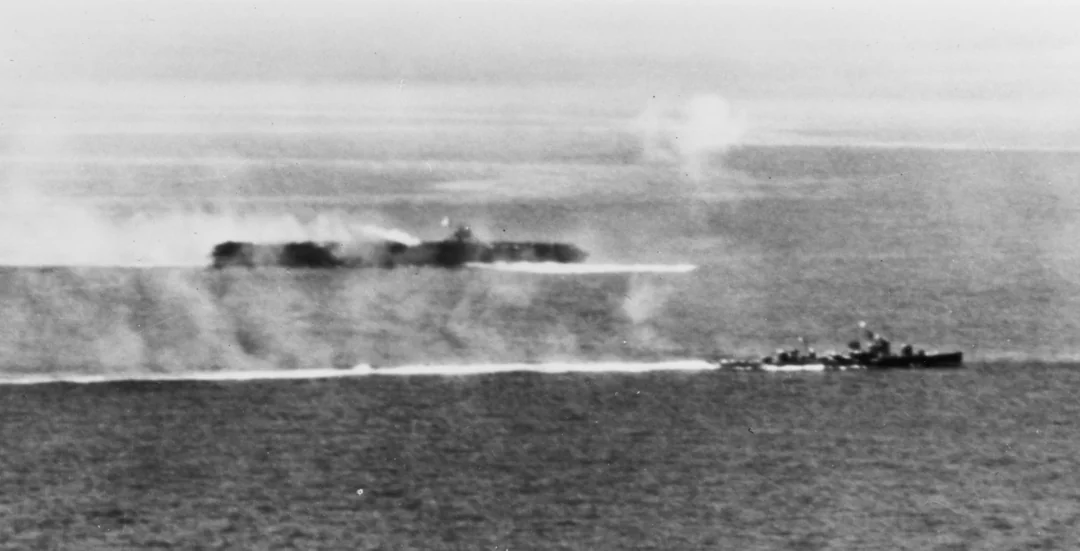
Wakatsuki

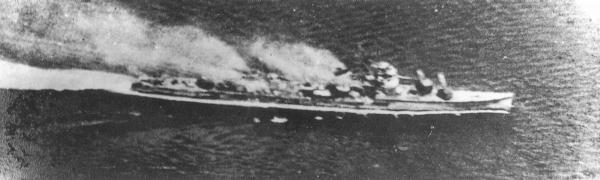
Wakatsuki

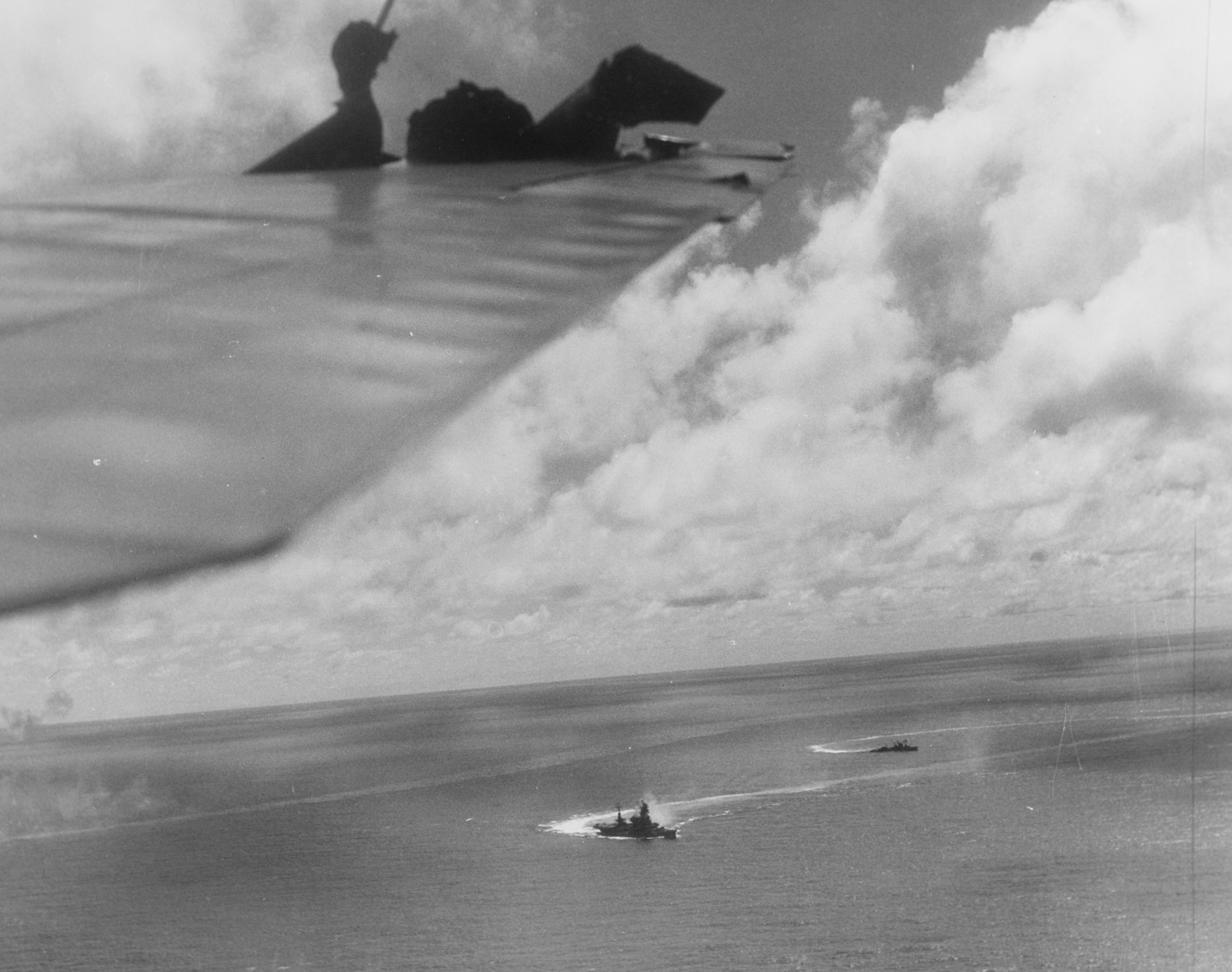
Shimotsuki

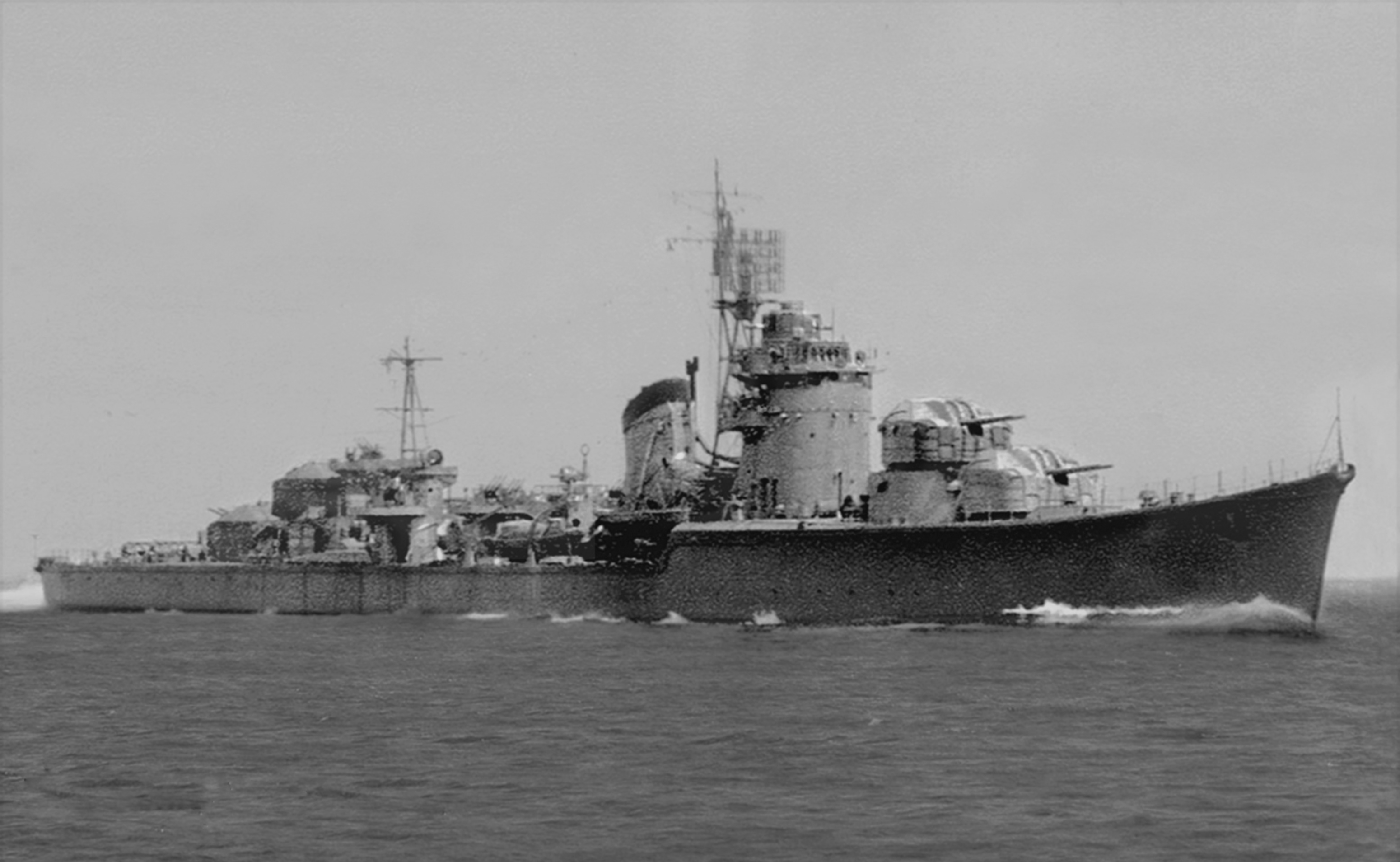
Fuyutsuki

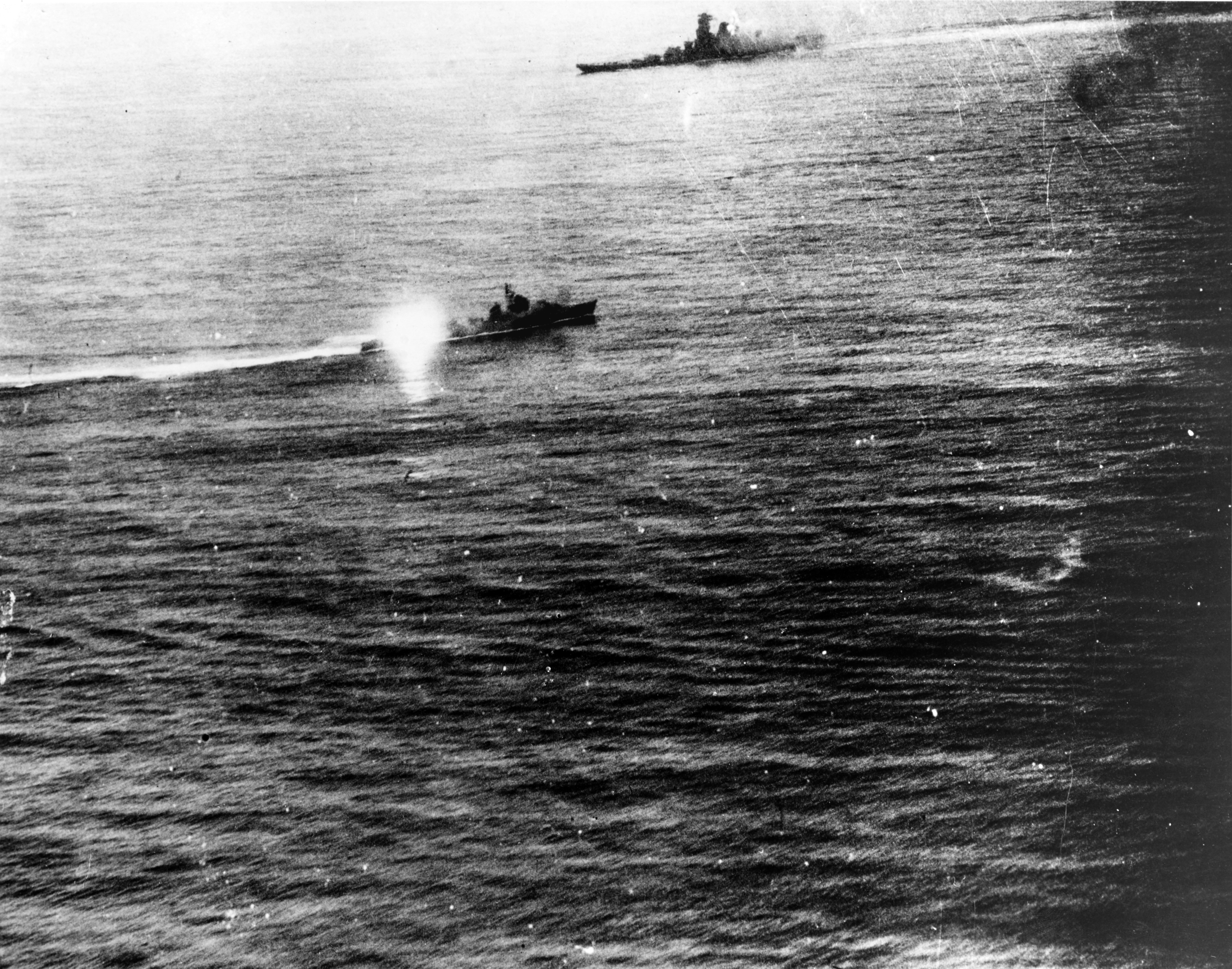
Fuyutsuki

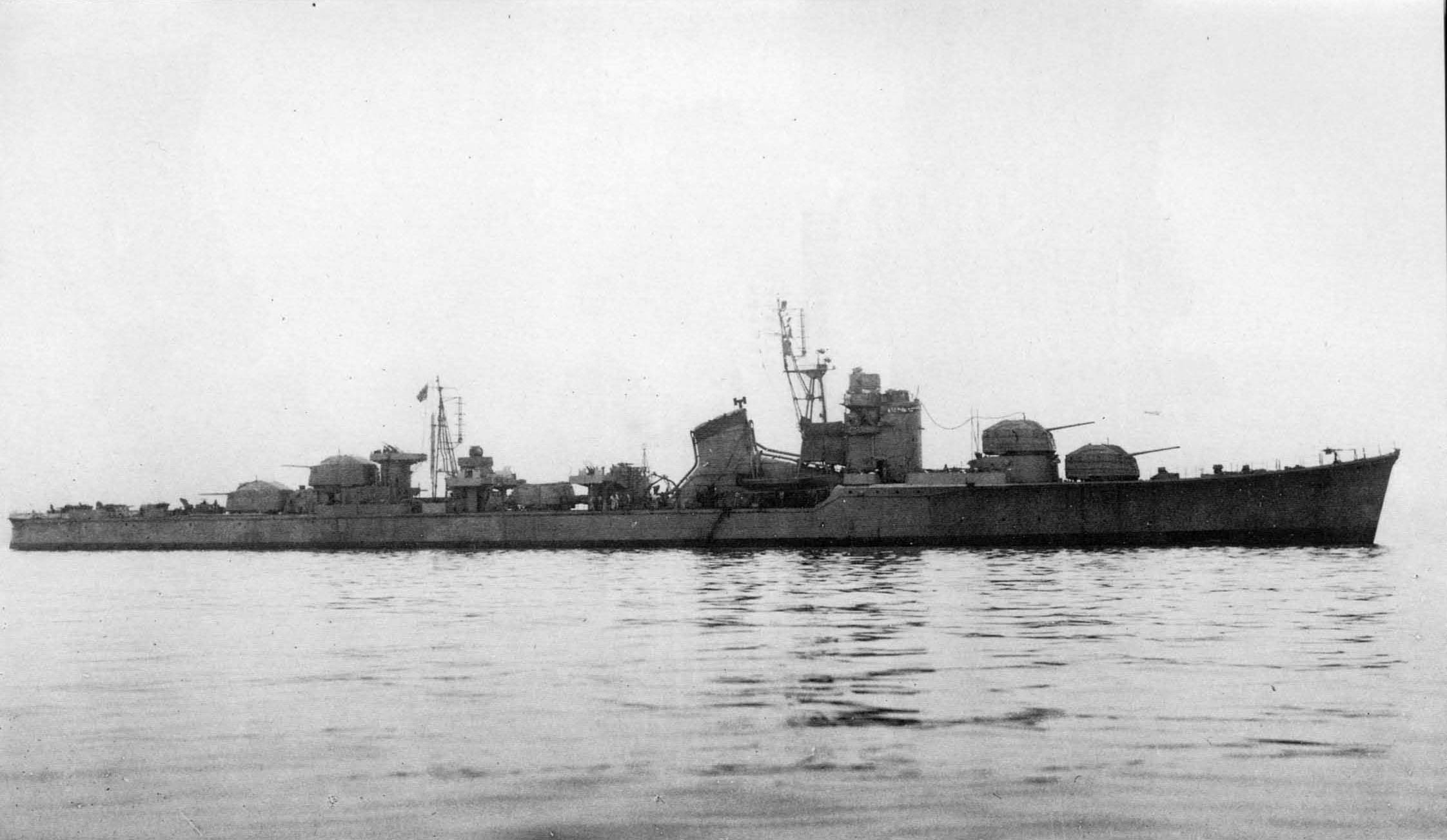
Harutsuki

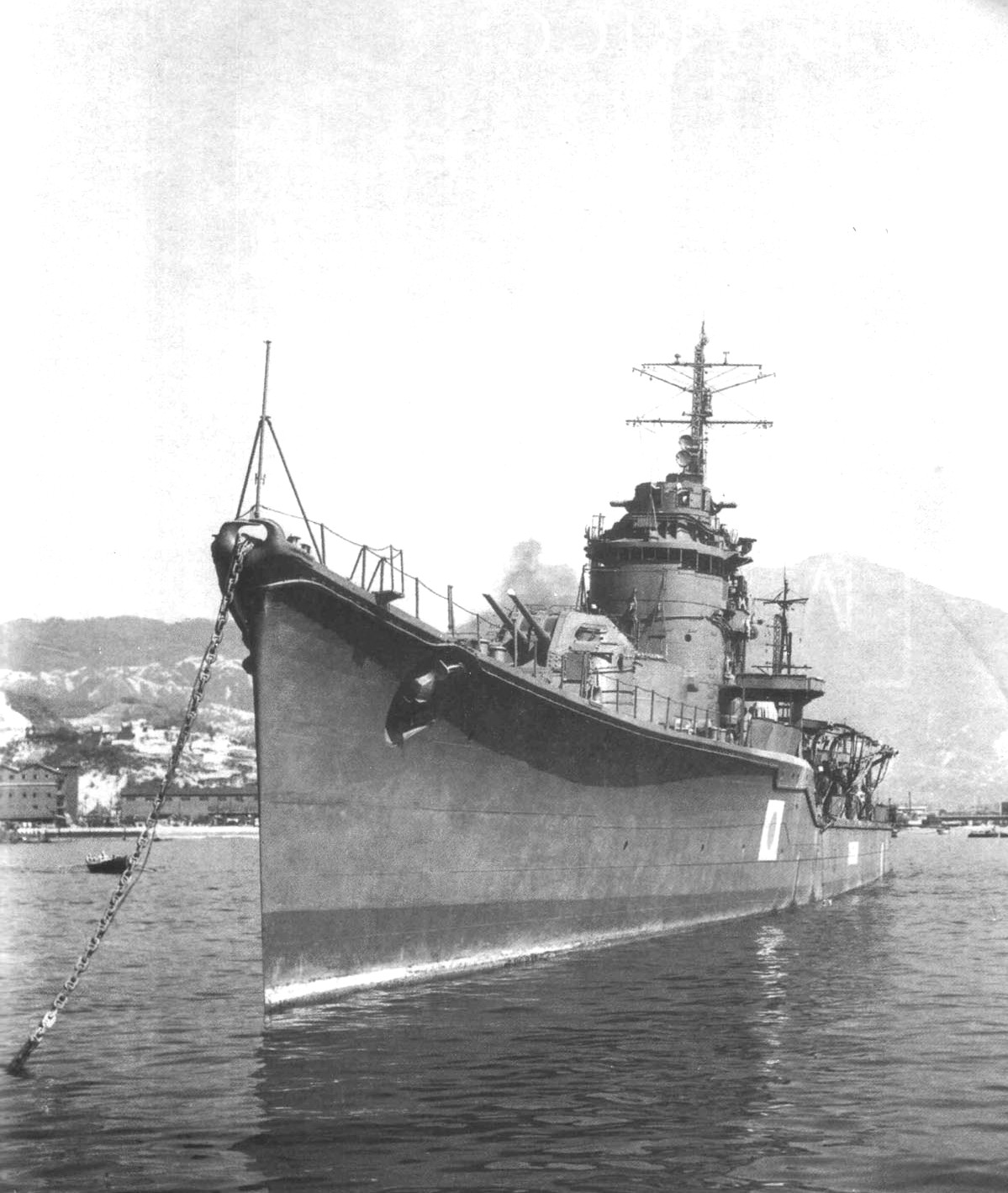
Yoizuki

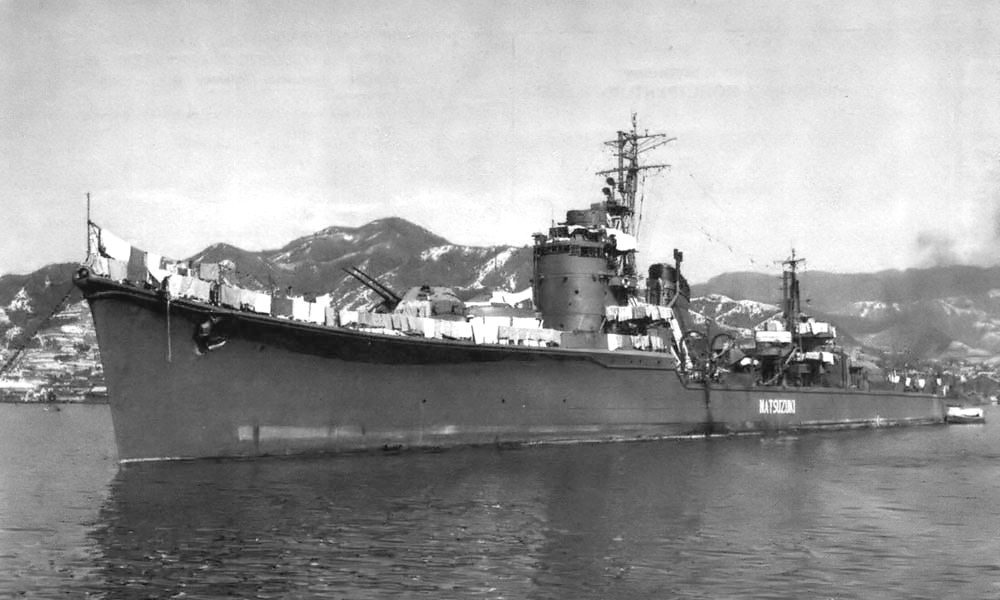
Natsuzuki

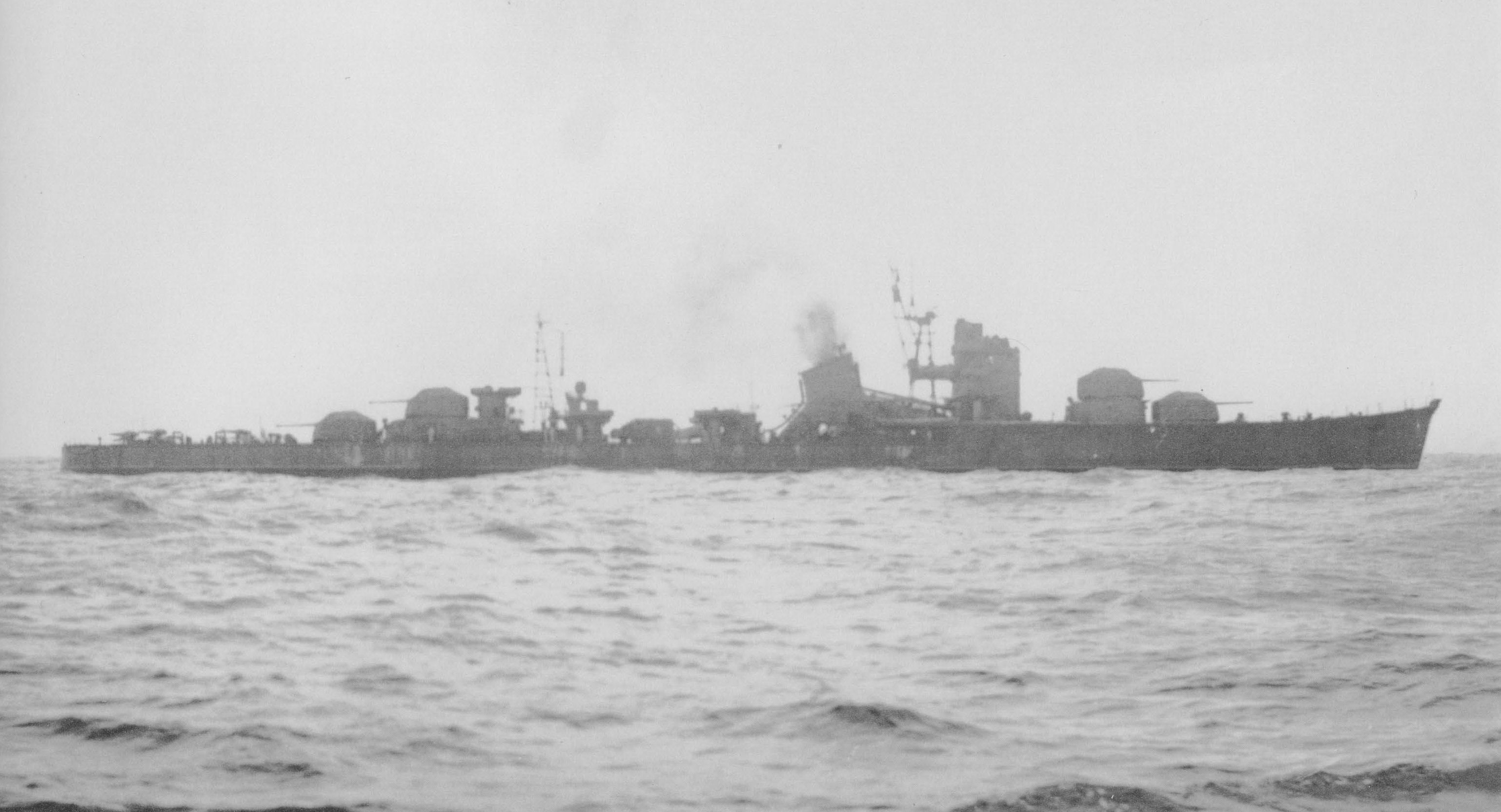
Hanazuki

== Bibliography ==
- Dodson, Aidan & Cant, Serena (2020). Spoils of War: The Fate of Enemy Fleets after Two World Wars. Barnsley, UK: Seaforth Publishing. ISBN 978-1-5267-4198-1.
- Jentschura, Hansgeorg; Jung, Dieter & Mickel, Peter (1977). Warships of the Imperial Japanese Navy, 1869–1945. Annapolis, Maryland: United States Naval Institute. ISBN 0-87021-893-X.
- Rohwer, Jürgen (2005). Chronology of the War at Sea 1939–1945: The Naval History of World War Two (Third Revised ed.). Annapolis, Maryland: Naval Institute Press. ISBN 1-59114-119-2.
- Stille, Mark (2013). Imperial Japanese Navy Destroyers 1919–45 (2): Asahio to Tachibana Classes. Botley, UK: Osprey Publishing. ISBN 978-1-84908-987-6.
- Sturton, Ian (1980). "Japan". In Chesneau, Roger (ed.). Conway's All the World's Fighting Ships 1922–1946. Greenwich, UK: Conway Maritime Press. ISBN 0-85177-146-7.
- Todaka, Kazushige, ed. (2020). Destroyers: Selected Photos from the Archives of the Kure Maritime Museum; the Best from the Collection of Shizuo Fukui's Photos of Japanese Warships. Japanese Naval Warship Photo Album. Annapolis, Maryland: Naval Institute Press. ISBN 978-1-59114-630-8.
- Whitley, M. J. (1988). Destroyers of World War Two: An International Encyclopedia. Annapolis, Maryland: Naval Institute Press. ISBN 0-87021-326-1.
