= 10 cm/65 Type 98 naval gun =

World War II naval gun of the Imperial Japanese Navy

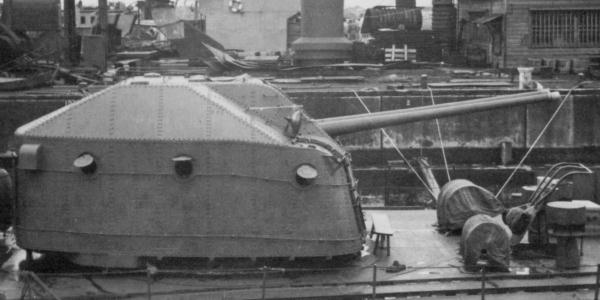
- A Type 98 gun mounted on the Japanese destroyer Harutsuki
- Type: Naval gun Coast defence gun
- Place of origin: Japan

Service history
- Used by: Imperial Japanese Navy Republic of China Navy
- Wars: World War II

Production history
- No. built: 169

Specifications
- Mass: 3,053 kilograms (6,731 lb) barrel & breech
- Barrel length: 6.73 metres (22.1 ft) bore (65 cal)
- Shell: 100 x 819mm .R; 13 kilograms (29 lb)
- Caliber: 100 millimetres (3.9 in)
- Elevation: -10° to +90°
- Rate of fire: 20-22 RPM
- Muzzle velocity: 1,010 m/s (3,314 ft/s)
- Effective firing range: Horizontal effective range: 14,000 metres (15,000 yd); Vertical effective ceiling: 11,000 metres (36,000 ft)
- Maximum firing range: Horizontal:19,500 metres (21,300 yd); Vertical: 13,000 metres (43,000 ft) at 90°

The 10 cm/65 Type 98 naval gun (六五口径九八式一〇糎高角砲), also known as the long 10cm high-angle gun (長10センチ高角砲), was a light caliber naval gun of the Imperial Japanese Navy used during World War II, employed on the aircraft carrier Taihō, the light cruiser Ōyodo, and Akizuki-class destroyers.

The gun was considered by the Japanese to be their finest anti-aircraft artillery weapon. It had excellent elevation and reach and could traverse quickly. Its rate of fire was good, though not as good as the U.S. 5”/38 dual-purpose gun. Its directors were also poorer, and the 10 cm/65 lacked the radar proximity fuse developed by the Allies. After the end of World War II, the gun remained in service on the two Japanese destroyers ceded to the Soviet Union and the Republic of China as war reparations. When it was used as a land-based weapon, it had suffered from needing considerable construction work in preparation for emplacement, which limited its usefulness to static defense. Nevertheless, 32 mounts were deployed for defense of the Japanese homeland, and another three on Iwo Jima, along with two more at Balikpapan. The Allied forces would first captured a shore-based twin-mounting of this weapon at Iwo Jima.

== Description ==
The 100 mm (3.9 in) 65 caliber Type 98 gun utilized a horizontal sliding breech, in addition to either monobloc (made from a single forging) or replaceable liner construction of the barrel. The gun featured a spring-powered rammer that was cocked by means of the recoil of the gun being fired; this allowed the rammer to load the gun at any elevation.

116 guns went to ship-based mounts: 12 for Taiho and 8 each on Oyodo and the 12 Akizuki-class destroyers. A shortcoming of the gun was that it had a service life of only 350-400 full charges, due to its high muzzle velocity.

=== Mountings ===
These guns were used in twin gun turrets. The total weight of the mount and guns on Akizuki was 34,500 kg (76,100 lb). The mount installed on Akizuki could traverse at 12° to 16° per second and could elevate at a rate of 16° per second. It was electro-hydraulically powered and could be moved by hand in the event of an emergency.

=== Ammunition ===
The gun fired a 100 mm (3.9 in), 28 kg (62 lb), fixed, high-explosive round with a brass casing. Only nose-fused high-explosive ammunition was developed for the gun.
