= Japanese aircraft carrier Chitose =

Aircraft carrier of the Imperial Japanese Navy

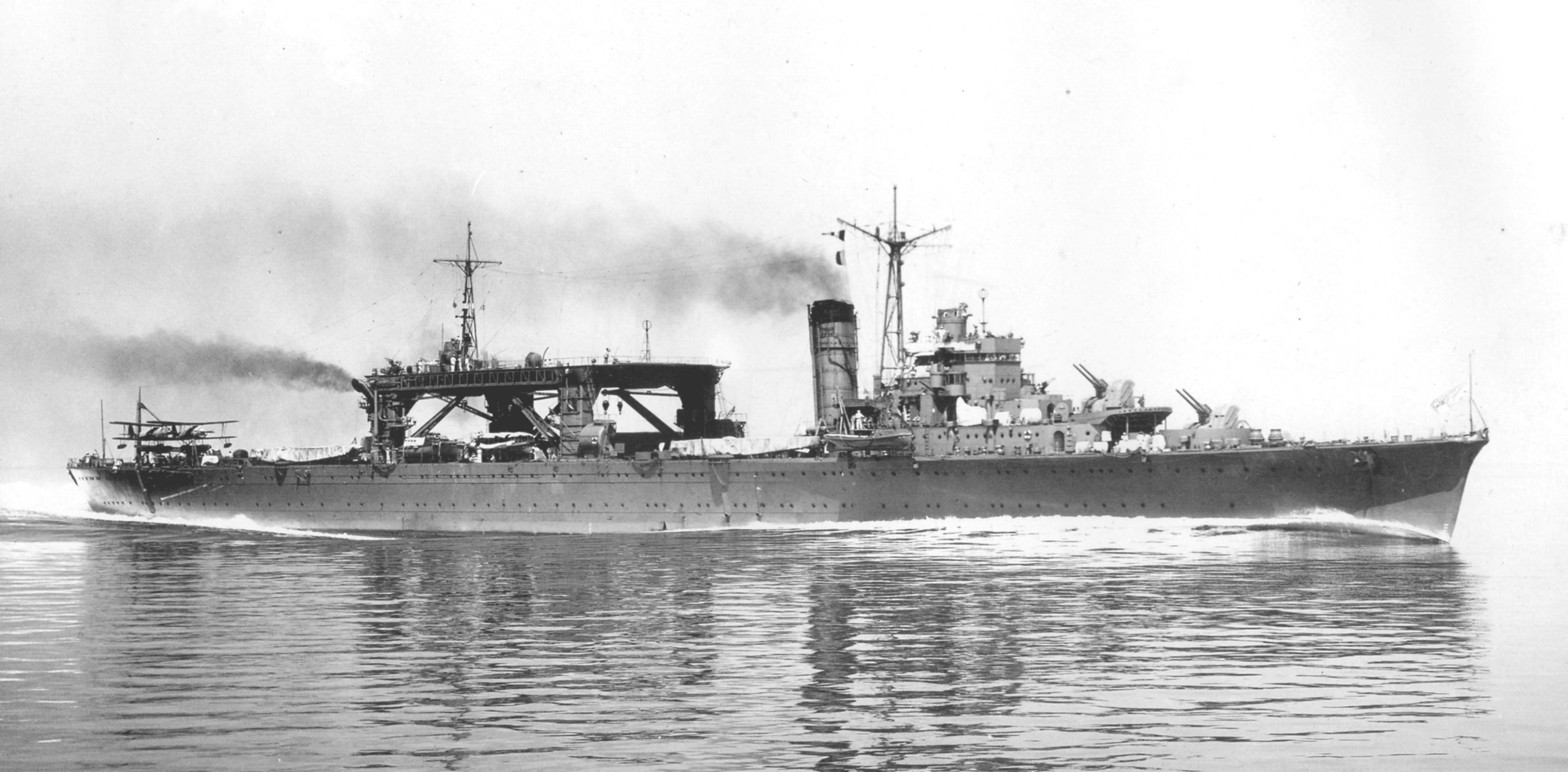
- Chitose as a seaplane carrier

History

Empire of Japan
- Name: Chitose
- Namesake: 千歳 (Thousand Years)
- Builder: Kure Naval Arsenal, Kure, Japan
- Laid down: 26 November 1934
- Launched: 29 November 1936
- Commissioned: 25 July 1938
- Notes: Converted from seaplane carrier to light aircraft carrier 26 January 1943–1 January 1944
- Recommissioned: 15 November 1943
- Reclassified: Light aircraft carrier 15 December 1943
- Reinstated: 1 January 1944
- Fate: Sunk 25 October 1944
- Stricken: 20 December 1944

General characteristics
- Class & type: Chitose-class aircraft carrier
- Displacement: 11,200 long tons (11,380 t) (standard); 15,300 long tons (15,546 t) (full load)
- Length: 192.5 m (631 ft 7 in)
- Beam: 20.8 m (68 ft 3 in)
- Draft: 7.5 m (24 ft 7 in)
- Installed power: 56,000 shp (42,000 kW)
- Propulsion: 2 × geared steam turbines; 2 × shafts
- Speed: 28.9 kn (53.5 km/h; 33.3 mph)
- Complement: 800
- Armament: Seaplane carrier: 4 × 12.7 cm/40 Type 89 naval guns; 12 × Type 96 25 mm AA gunss; Aircraft carrier 8 × 12.7 cm/40 Type 89 naval gun; 30-48 × Type 96 25 mm AA guns
- Aircraft carried: Seaplane carrier 24 × floatplanes; Aircraft carrier: 30 × aircraft
- Aviation facilities: Seaplane tender: 4 × catapults; Aircraft carrier: 2 × elevators

Chitose (千歳) was a warship of the Imperial Japanese Navy that served from 1938 to 1944, seeing service as a seaplane carrier and later as a light aircraft carrier during World War II. In her initial guise as a seaplane carrier, she first saw service during the Second Sino-Japanese War in 1938, and subsequently played a key role in the Imperial Japanese Navy's development of a network of seaplane bases on the islands of the Pacific Ocean. After the outbreak of World War II in the Pacific, she took part in the Philippines campaign, the Dutch East Indies campaign, the Battle of Midway, and the Guadalcanal campaign, during which she was damaged in the Battle of the Eastern Solomons and also saw service related to the Battle of Cape Esperance.

Chitose was converted into a light aircraft carrier during 1943, and subsequently took part in the Battle of the Philippine Sea and the Battle of Leyte Gulf. She was sunk in the Battle off Cape Engaño, one of several actions that made up the Battle of Leyte Gulf, on 25 October 1944.

Although it has been speculated that Chitose as a seaplane carrier also carried Type A midget submarines, only her sister ship Chiyoda had that capability.

== Construction and commissioning ==
Chitose was laid down on 26 November 1934 by the Kure Naval Arsenal at Kure, Japan. Launched on 29 November 1936, she was completed as a seaplane carrier and commissioned on 25 July 1938.

== Service history ==
=== Seaplane carrier ===
==== Second Sino-Japanese War ====
When Chitose entered service, the Second Sino-Japanese War had been raging for a year. Operating her original complement of Kawanishi E7K (Allied reporting name "Alf") and Nakajima E8N (Allied reporting name "Dave") floatplanes, she supported Operation Z, the surprise unopposed landing of the Imperial Japanese Army′s 21st Army at Bias Bay on the coast of China 35 miles (56 km) northeast of Hong Kong, on 12 October 1938. The 21st Army advanced against little opposition toward its main objective, Canton, which fell to the Japanese on 29 October 1938.

==== 1939–1941 ====
On 15 November 1939, the Imperial Japanese Navy established the 4th Fleet at Truk Atoll under the command of Vice Admiral Eikichi Katagiri, with Chitose as Katagiri's flagship. In December 1939, Chitose, the seaplane tender Kinugasa Maru, and 24 Kawanishi H6K (Allied reporting name "Mavis") flying boats were stationed at Truk. From December 1939 into 1940, Chitose and Kinugasa Maru were involved in transporting construction crews and technicians to build seaplane and flying boat ramps at Dublon in Truk Atoll, Malakal Island in the Palau Islands, Ebeye Island and Roi at Kwajalein Atoll, and Saipan in the Mariana Islands, and also made several voyages to and from Japan to transport construction materials to these locations.

On 11 October 1940, Chitose was one of 98 Imperial Japanese Navy ships that gathered along with more than 500 aircraft on the Japanese coast at Yokohama Bay for an Imperial fleet review — the largest fleet review in Japanese history — in honor of the 2,600th anniversary of the enthronement of the Emperor Jimmu, Japan's legendary first emperor. The occasion was the first time that Chitose and many other new Japanese naval vessels — including the seaplane carriers Chiyoda and Mizuho and the heavy cruisers Tone and Chikuma, which had extensive floatplane-handling capabilities — were displayed to the public. She arrived at Sasebo, Japan, on 15 October 1940 to undergo repairs and an overhaul.

By November 1941, Chitose and Mizuho made up Seaplane Tender Division 11. On 2 December 1941, Chitose was deployed at Palau as the Japanese armed forces mobilized to enter World War II with an offensive against Allied forces.

==== World War II ====
===== Philippines campaign =====
On 8 December 1941 Japan time — 7 December 1941 on the other side of the International Date Line in Hawaii — the Pacific War began when Japan entered World War II with its surprise attack on Pearl Harbor, Hawaii. On 8 December, Chitose and Mizuho were attached to the 2nd Fleet to operate as part of the Fourth Surprise Attack Force, tasked with providing air cover for amphibious landings at Legaspi in southeastern Luzon in the Philippine Islands. Chitose got underway from Palau on 8 December and supported the landings on 11–12 December.

After the Legaspi landings, Chitose continued to operate in support of Japanese operations in the Philippines campaign. On 14 December 1941, one of her Mitsubishi F1M (Allied reporting name "Pete") floatplanes unsuccessfully attacked a B-17 Flying Fortress bomber of the United States Army Air Forces Far East Air Force as the B-17 flew over Catanduanes Island off Legaspi on an anti-shipping strike. On 19 December, she was 200 nautical miles (370 km; 230 mi) east of Davao on Mindanao when she launched seaplanes to reconnoiter Davao. From 20 to 25 December 1941 she was attached to the forces supporting the Japanese landings at Davao and at Jolo on Jolo Island in the Sulu Archipelago.

===== Dutch East Indies campaign =====
On 26 December 1941, Chitose was transferred to the 2nd Air Force, a component of the Netherlands Indies Force in the Eastern Occupation Forces, to operate in support of Japanese forces during the Dutch East Indies campaign. She departed Davao on 2 January 1942. Chitose was anchored in Malalag Bay in Davao Gulf on the coast of Mindanao on 4 January 1942 when U.S. Army Air Forces B-17D Flying Fortresses flying from Java attacked the anchorage, and five of her floatplanes suffered damage from splinters from a bomb hit on the nearby heavy cruiser Myōkō.

As part of the 11th Seaplane Tender Division with Mizuho, Chitose proceeded to the waters of the Netherlands East Indies to support the Japanese invasion of those islands as part of the 2nd Fleet, Southern Force, Netherlands East Indies Force. She rendezvoused with Mizuho and the two vessels anchored west of the Sangihe Islands at 09:00 on 10 January 1942. From their anchorage, the two ships launched floatplanes to escort an invasion convoy heading for Manado in northern Celebes, make reconnaissance flights, and conduct a harassing bombing raid on an Allied radiotelephone station. After sunset on 10 January, the two seaplane carriers got back underway and headed toward Manado.

The Battle of Manado began on 11 January 1942 as Japanese Special Naval Landing Force (SNLF) personnel landed at Kema and Manado in northern Celebes, and Chitose and Mizuho arrived at an anchorage at Bangka Island off the northeastern tip of Celebes at 05:40 that day. Sources are unclear on the aircraft the two seaplane carriers operated, one asserting that they carried a combined 49 Aichi E13A (Allied reporting name "Jake") floatplanes and another that Chitose operated Mitsubishi F1Ms (Allied reporting name "Pete"). The two seaplane tenders conducted air operations from 06:30 to 19:00 in support of the landings. During the day, Chitose and Mizuho floatplanes reported engaging nine Allied flying boats and four Allied bombers, claiming two flying boats shot down; in one action, seven Netherlands Naval Aviation Service and United States Asiatic Fleet PBY Catalina flying boats attacked Japanese forces landing at Manado, and a floatplane from Chitose — described by one source as an F1M — shot down one of the Dutch Catalinas. In a friendly fire incident, one E13A from Mizuho shot down an Imperial Japanese Navy Yokosuka L3Y (Allied reporting name "Tina") carrying SNLF paratroopers when it flew low over the anchorage without responding to recognition signals. Between them, the two ships lost three floatplanes — all identified by one source as E13As — during the day, one which crashed and two which were wrecked in emergency landings. The landings concluded on 12 January 1942.

Allied opposition to the advance of Japanese forces at Manado was slight, and although Chitose and Mizuho continued to support Japanese forces ashore there on 12 and 13 January 1942, their aircraft did not need to fly any ground-support missions. From 14 to 19 January, they both searched unsuccessfully for Allied submarines in the Celebes Sea, based on what turned out to be erroneous information. They were released from supporting the Manado landings on 19 January 1942.

Chitose and Mizuho departed Bangka Island on 21 January 1942 and proceeded to the waters off Kendari on the southeastern coast of Celebes, patrolling the waters ahead of an invasion convoy carrying SNLF forces bound for Kendari, their aircraft conducting combat air and antisubmarine patrols over and around the convoy. The Battle of Kendari began with Japanese landings on 23 and 24 January 1942. The two seaplane carriers provided distant support to the Japanese operation, and Chitose and Mizuho arrived at Sarabanka Bay (or Salabangka Bay) on the coast of Celebes on the morning of 24 January, from which they conducted further air operations in support of Japanese forces at Kendari. On 26 January, Chitose separated from Mizuho, departing Sarabangka Bay bound for the Bangka Island anchorage accompanied by destroyers.

Assigned to support the Japanese invasion of Ambon Island in the Molucca Islands, Chitose got back underway on 29 January 1942. She rendezvoused with Mizuho south of Mangole Island at 10:00 on 30 January 1942, and the two seaplane carriers spent the day in the Manipa Strait, providing cover for Japanese invasion forces approaching Ambon and conducting harassing bombing raids against Namlea on Buru that doubled as reconnaissance flights. They departed the strait in the evening and made for an anchorage in Keelang Bay on the southwestern tip of Ceram Island, where they arrived at 05:50 on 31 January 1942 to provide air cover for the invasion of Ambon, although bad weather made flight operations impossible that day. The weather subsequently improved, and on 1 and 2 February 1942 floatplanes from both ships provided air and antisubmarine defense to the Japanese invasion convoy, devoted about 70 sorties each day to heavy attacks against Allied ground forces on Ambon, and patrolled over the Banda Sea.

The two seaplane carriers parted company at 15:00 on 3 February 1942, when Mizuho got underway from the Keelang Bay anchorage for Staring Bay on the southeast coast of Celebes. At 19:00, Chitose also departed Keelang Bay to proceed to Piru Bay on the coast of Ceram, accompanied by a patrol boat.

Chitose rendezvoused with Mizuho in the Flores Sea southwest of Kabaena Island at 07:20 on 8 February 1942, and the two ships headed westward to support Japanese landings at Makassar on the southwest coast of Celebes. The landings began that evening around midnight in bad weather with poor visibility. Chitose and Mizuho were anchored in Makassar Strait southwest of Bulunrue Island south of Celebes at 03:40 on 10 February 1942 when three U.S. Army Air Forces LB-30 Liberator bombers of the Far East Air Force's 19th Bomb Group attacked them, damaging Chitose. At 19:20, Chitose parted company with Mizuho, getting underway along with two patrol boats for Jolo in the Sulu Islands in the Philippines. Chitose supported Japanese operations against Surabaya in eastern Java on 14 February 1942.

Chitose was at Balikpapan in Japanese-occupied Dutch Borneo by 22 February 1942, and she took aboard aircraft from the crippled seaplane tender Sanuki Maru there, bringing the combined aircraft complement of Chitose and Mizuho back nearly to full strength. Chitose got back underway on 24 February 1942 to support the Japanese invasion of Java. She rendezvoused with Mizuho south of Sebuku off the southeast coast of Borneo on 25 February, and the two ships anchored off Cape South — the southern tip of Borneo — for a time on 26 February before getting back underway and heading westward toward Cape Puting while covering the Japanese invasion force. They anchored off Cape Puting on 27 February 1942 and conducted air operations that day during the Battle of the Java Sea, although bad weather at the anchorage allowed them to launch few aircraft. That evening they accompanied the Japanese invasion convoy southward toward Bawean Island.

On 28 February 1942 — the day of the Japanese landings on Java — Chitose and Mizuho anchored off the west coast of Bawean Island. During the day, the two seaplane carriers launched floatplanes to protect the Japanese invasion convoy bound for Kragan from attack by Allied aircraft or by the remnants of the American-British-Dutch-Australian Command (ABDA) fleet defeated in the Battle of the Java Sea the previous day. They sighted no ABDA ships, but did observe three gunboats and eight torpedo boats in the channel at the main Dutch naval base at Sarabaya. During the day, Japanese landings took place at Batavia, Merak, Banten Bay, and Eretenwetan.

On 1 March 1942, plans to set up a seaplane base at Kragan were scrapped when the Japanese found the waters off the beach there too shallow for seaplane operations. Remaining off Bawean Island, Chitose and Mizuho began air operations in support of the landings in the morning. At 09:45, they curtailed ground-support operations to focus on protecting the Japanese invasion fleet from air attack, and during the day E13A1s from the two ships claimed three Allied Northrop light bombers shot down, but much of what they did on 1 March is ambiguous or poorly documented. One of the ships launched two floatplanes at 11:40 to follow up on a reported sighting west of Bawean Island of the Royal Navy heavy cruiser HMS Exeter and destroyer HMS Encounter, and at 12:40 the ships launched a strike by 11 Mitsubishi F1M2 (Allied reporting name "Pete") floatplanes against Exeter and Encounter, but they failed to find the ships due to frequent tropical rain squalls. Meanwhile, at 12:30 an F1M2 from Chitose sighted the U.S. Navy destroyer USS Pope off Java. A strike by Chitose and Mizuho aircraft as well as floatplanes from the heavy cruisers Ashigara, Myōkō, Nachi, and Haguro sometime between 13:00 and 14:30 inflicted damage that caused flooding and disabled one of Pope's propeller shafts. Later, a strike by six Nakajima B5N (Allied reporting name "Kate") torpedo bombers from the aircraft carrier Ryūjō attacked Pope, and Ashigara and Myōkō intercepted and sank her at 15:40.

On 2 March 1942, Chitose and Mizuho set up a seaplane base at Karangdawa, 3 miles (4.8 km) east of Cape Awarawara, from which they continued to support the Java landings. They departed Bawean Island on 3 March escorted by three patrol boats and headed for Kendari, which they reached on 6 March. After routine maintenance and repairs, they got underway from Staring Bay on 9 March 1942 to return to the combat area at Cape Awarawara, but Dutch forces on Java surrendered that day. They arrived at Kragan on 12 March, dismantled the seaplane base, and at 20:00 departed Kragan bound for Makassar, where they arrived at 11:30 on 14 March. There Chitose and Mizuho separated for the last time, when Mizuho was reassigned and departed for Japan.

Chitose was reassigned to the N Occupation (or Expeditionary) Force on 15 March 1942 for operations in Netherlands New Guinea. The N Force assembled at Ambon Island on 29 March 1942. Chitose arrived at Boela on Ceram Island on 31 March and thereafter provided cover for a series of Japanese landings along the coast of Netherlands New Guinea, at Fakfak on 1 April, Babo on 2 April, and Sorong on 4 April 1942. She then provided cover for landings at Ternate in the Molucca Islands on 7 April, at Djailolo on Halmahera on 8 April, at Manokwari on the coast of Netherlands New Guinea on 12 April, and at Moemi and Seroei on Japen Island off the north coast of New Guinea on 15 April 1942. At Nabire on the north coast of Netherlands New Guinea on 17 April 1942, she transferred 63 troops to the auxiliary gunboat Taiko Maru which Taiko Maru put ashore on the east side of Japen Island on 18 April. Chitose then returned to providing cover for Japanese landings in Netherlands New Guinea, at Sarmi and on Wakde on 19 April and at Hollandia on 20 April 1942.

===== April–May 1942 =====
Chitose departed Ambon Island bound for Sasebo, Japan, on 21 April 1942, and with the New Guinea campaign completed, she was reassigned to the Advance Force on 23 April 1942. She made an overnight stop at Davao on 25–26 April and arrived at Sasebo on 1 May 1942. She was in drydock at Sasebo from 9 to 16 May 1942 for a refit, then departed Sasebo on 16 May bound for Kure. During May 1942, she became the flagship of the 11th Seaplane Tender Division. She departed Kure bound for Saipan on 21 May 1942.

===== Battle of Midway =====
The 11th Seaplane Tender Division, now consisting of Chitose and the seaplane tender Kamikawa Maru, was assigned to participate in Operation MI — the planned Japanese invasion of Midway Atoll — and on 28 May 1942 Chitose and Kamikawa Maru got underway from Saipan headed for Midway as part of the Midway Invasion Force under the command of Vice Admiral Nobutake Kondo. Chitose embarked 16 floatplane fighters and four reconnaissance floatplanes for the operation, and she and Kamikawa Maru made the voyage to Midway as part of a convoy that also included 12 transports and an oiler, escorted by the light cruiser Jintsū and nine destroyers. As the convoy approached Midway on 3 June 1942, nine U.S. Army Air Forces B-17 Flying Fortresses bombed it and U.S. Navy PBY Catalina amphibious aircraft attacked it with torpedoes, but Chitose escaped damage. On 4 June 1942, a PBY of U.S. Navy Patrol Squadron 44 (VP-44) found the convoy, and Chitose launched three Mitsubishi F1M (Allied reporting name "Pete") floatplanes to intercept it; they shot the PBY down from an altitude of 500 feet (152 m) with the loss of five members of its crew. Its six survivors were rescued from the water by another PBY on 6 June, but one of them died on 7 June 1942.

The Japanese suffered a decisive defeat on 4 June 1942 during the Battle of Midway and subsequently cancelled the invasion of Midway. Chitose was detached from the Midway Invasion Force on 7 June 1942 and proceeded to Wake Island in company with the heavy cruisers Haguro and Myōkō and three destroyers. She then returned to Japan.

===== June–July 1942 =====
Chitose was assigned to the A Air Group of the Occupation Force on 18 June 1942. She departed Kure on 26 June 1942 bound for Chichijima in the Ogasawara Islands, where she made a port call from 28 to 29 June 1942. She then returned to Japan and spent July 1942 in the Tokyo Bay area. On 14 July 1942, she again became flagship of Seaplane Tender Division 11, and as of that day carried 14 Mitsubishi F1M2 (Allied reporting name "Pete") and five Aichi E13A1 (Allied reporting name "Jake") floatplanes, with two of each type in reserve. She was in drydock at the Yokosuka Naval Arsenal in Yokosuka, Japan, from 20 to 23 July 1942.

===== Guadalcanal campaign =====
The Guadalcanal campaign began on 7 August 1942 with United States Marine Corps landings on Guadalcanal in the Solomon Islands. Chitose departed Sasebo on 9 August headed for Yokosuka, where she arrived on 11 August. She departed Yokosuka later the same day bound for Truk as part of Kondo's 2nd Fleet Support Force in company with the battleship Mutsu, five heavy cruisers, a light cruiser, and 10 destroyers. She called at Truk from 17 to 23 August 1942, when she sortied as part of Kondo's Advance Force in company with five heavy cruisers, a light cruiser, and six destroyers as Japanese forces deployed for an operation to reinforce Japanese forces on Guadalcanal, resulting in the Battle of the Eastern Solomons.

====== Battle of the Eastern Solomons ======
The Battle of the Eastern Solomons began on 24 August 1942. At around 10:15, three F1M2s from Chitose attacked a PBY Catalina searching for the Japanese aircraft carrier force, and another three F1M2s drove off a PBY looking for Japanese troopships. Another Chitose floatplane discovered U.S. Navy Task Force 11, centered around the aircraft carrier USS Saratoga, and Task Force 16, centered around the aircraft carrier USS Enterprise. At 18:20, two SBD Dauntless dive bombers from Bombing Squadron 3 (VB-3) aboard Saratoga attacked Chitose, damaging her port engine and hull plates and set three F1M2s on her deck on fire. She took on a 30-degree list to port.

The destroyer Minegumo took Chitose under tow on 25 August 1942 and headed toward Truk. En route, seven B-17 Flying Fortresses of the U.S. Army Air Forces 11th Heavy Bombardment Group attacked the ships, but inflicted no damage on them. As Minegumo and Chitose neared Truk on 28 August, they experienced an antisubmarine alert which culminated in an attack by the U.S. Navy submarine USS Flying Fish against the nearby battleship Yamato, which was arriving at Truk from Japan with an escort of three destroyers. Flying Fish's four torpedoes missed Yamato, and all the Japanese ships arrived safely at Truk.

====== August–October 1942 ======
On 28 August, the Imperial Japanese Navy created the R Area Air Force, a floatplane unit intended to reinforce land-based Imperial Japanese Navy Air Service aircraft in the Solomon Islands. Chitose put her floatplanes ashore at Truk so that they could deploy to the Shortland Islands as part of the R Area Air Force, then underwent repairs at Truk. With them done, she headed for Japan for further repairs at the Yokosuka Naval Arsenal, arriving at Yokosuka in September 1942. After their completion, she departed Yokosuka on 14 September 1942, called at Truk from 18 to 20 September, at Rabaul on New Britain in the Bismarck Archipelago from 22 to 24 September, at the Shortland Islands and at Buin on Bougainville in the Solomon Islands from 25 to 27 September before arriving at Kavieng on New Ireland in the Bismarck Archipelago on 28 September 1942.

During Chitose′s stay at Kavieng, one of her F1M2s flying combat air patrol spotted four Allied fighters and five B-17E Flying Fortresses of the U.S. Army Air Forces 72nd Bombardment Squadron approaching the fleet on 4 October 1942. To prevent them from attacking the seaplane carrier Nisshin, the F1M2's pilot rammed the lead B-17E, tearing off the B-17E's right wing and vertical stabilizer and damaging the F1M2's right wing. The F1M2's two-man crew parachuted to safety before their floatplane crashed and was rescued by the destroyer Akatsuki, and the B-17E crashed with the loss of its entire crew.

====== Battle of Cape Esperance ======
Chitose departed Kavieng on 7 October 1942 and proceeded to Rabaul, where she was assigned to the Reinforcement Force of the Outer South Seas Force and tasked with carrying reinforcements to the Japanese forces fighting on Guadalcanal. Departing Rabaul on 8 October 1942, she made for the anchorage in the Shortland Islands, which she reached on 9 October. At the Shortlands, Chitose and Nisshin between them embarked 280 troops of the Imperial Japanese Army's 2nd Division along with four 150 mm howitzers with their prime movers, two field guns, 14 caissons, an antiaircraft gun, ammunition, provisions, and 675 other men. They departed the Shortlands on 11 October 1942 bound for Tassafaronga Point on the north coast of Guadalcanal escorted by six destroyers — four of them also carrying reinforcements — and covered by a force of heavy cruisers and destroyers which planned to distract Allied forces by bombarding Henderson Field on Guadalcanal. While the Battle of Cape Esperance raged nearby between the Japanese covering force and a task force of U.S. Navy cruisers and destroyers during the night of 11–12 October 1942, Chitose, Nisshin, and their accompanying destroyers discharged their passengers and cargo at Guadalcanal unmolested and, except for two destroyers detached to search for survivors of the sunken heavy cruiser Furutaka, headed back to the Shortlands, which they reached on 14 October 1942.

====== October–November 1942 ======
While Chitose was at the Shortlands, one of her floatplanes sighted an American supply convoy approaching Guadalcanal on 15 October 1942. Based on the floatplane's sighting report, the aircraft carrier Zuikaku launched an airstrike against the convoy which sank the destroyer USS Meredith.

Chitose refueled from the oiler Omurosan Maru on 27 October 1942, and on 3 November 1942 Kamikawa Maru replaced her as flagship of Seaplane Tender Division 11. In company with the seaplane carrier Chiyoda and escorted by two destroyers, Chitose departed the Shortlands on 3 November bound for Truk, where the ships arrived on 6 November. Chitose got back underway on 10 November and proceeded to Sasebo, arriving there on 15 November 1942. She was drydocked at the Sasebo Naval Arsenal on 28 November 1942.

=== Aircraft carrier ===
==== Conversion ====
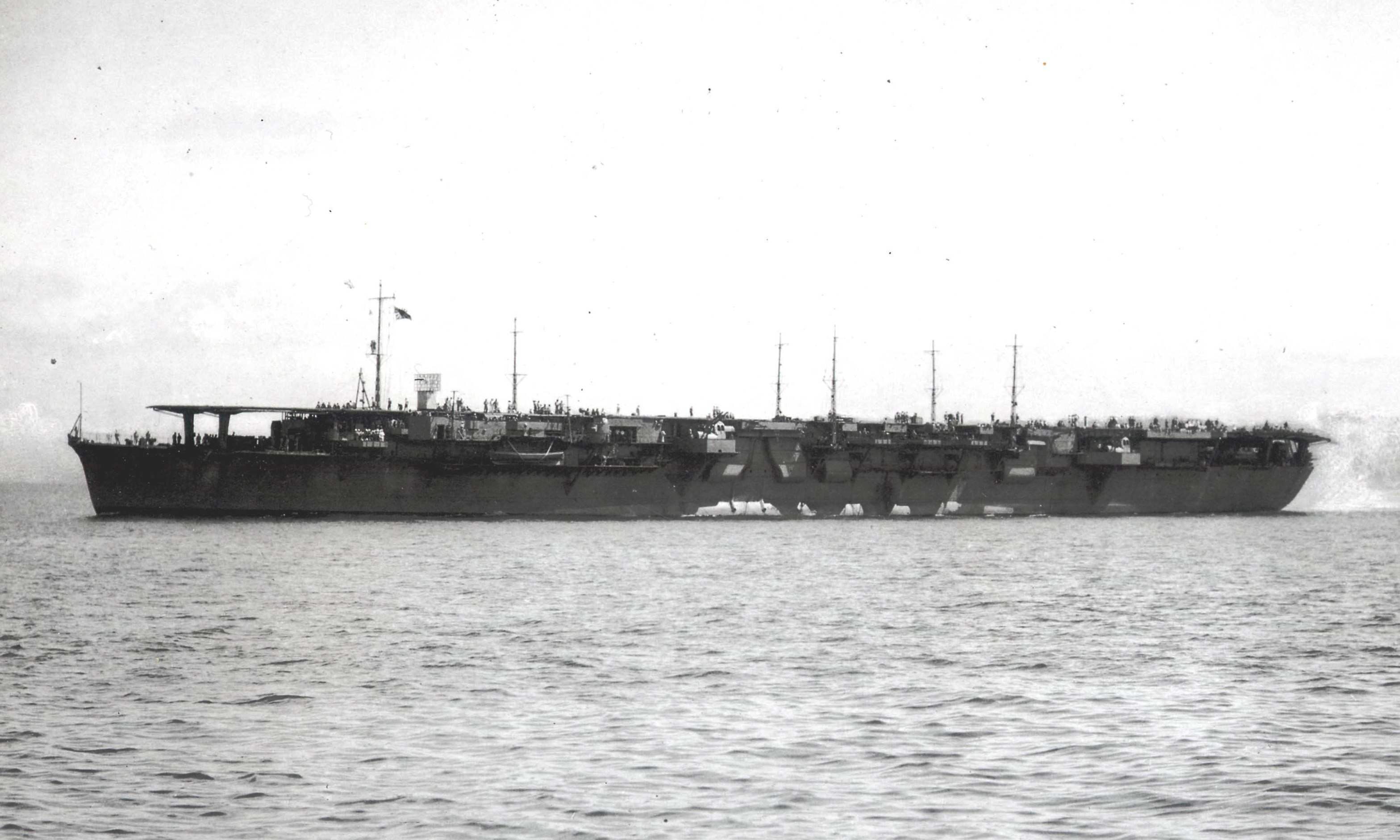
Chitose in 1944 after her conversion into a light aircraft carrier.

Chitose began conversion to a light aircraft carrier at the Sasebo Naval Arsenal on 26 January 1943. She was recommissioned on 1 November 1943 and moved to Kure on 17 December 1943. After final fitting out, she was completed as an aircraft carrier on 1 January 1944.

==== January–June 1944 ====
Upon completion of her conversion, Chitose on 1 January 1944 was assigned to the 1st Mobile Fleet and attached to its 3rd Fleet. On 11 January 1944 she departed the Seto Inland Sea bound for Singapore, which she reached on 20 January. She got back underway on 25 January 1944 headed for Sasebo. During her voyage, she was assigned to Carrier Division 3, 3rd Fleet, 1st Mobile Fleet, on 1 February 1944. She arrived at Sasebo on 4 February 1944.

Chitose departed Sasebo on 15 February 1944, called at Kagoshima, Japan, from 16 to 20 February, and then proceeded to Saipan, where she arrived on 26 February 1944. She got back underway on 29 February 1944 to return to Japan, and arrived at Yokosuka on 4 March 1944. She moved from Yokosuka to Kisarazu on 13 March, then back to Yokosuka on 17 March 1944. She was in drydock at the Yokosuka Naval Arsenal from 19 to 24 March, then departed Yokosuka on 25 March bound for the Seto Inland Sea, which she reached on 27 March 1944. She remained in the Seto Inland Sea through April 1944.

On 5 and 6 May 1944, Chitose embarked aircraft of Air Group 653, and on 11 May 1944 she departed Saeki, Japan, to head for Tawi-Tawi in the southern Philippines, where she and her sister ship Chiyoda — which also had been converted from a seaplane carrier into an aircraft carrier — were to rendezvous with a task force consisting of the battleship Musashi, the aircraft carriers Hiyō, Jun'yō, Zuihō, and Ryūhō, and three destroyers. After pausing briefly at Okinawa on 12 May, she headed south, and on 16 May 1944 arrived at Tawi-Tawi, where Japanese naval forces were assembling to carry out Operation A-Go, the Japanese defense of the Mariana Islands. While Chitose was at sea off Tawi-Tawi conducting air training on 22 May 1944, the U.S. Navy submarine USS Puffer fired a spread of torpedoes at her at 09:24, but they exploded in her wake and she escaped damage.

To escape the growing danger of submarine attack off Tawi-Tawi and reach a better jumping-off point for the defense of Saipan, which U.S. ships and aircraft had begun to bombard on 11 June 1944, Chitose departed Tawi-Tawi on 13 June 1944 to move to Guimaras in the western Visayas. Arriving there on 14 June, she began to take on supplies. On 15 June 1944, with U.S. forces landing on Saipan, Operation A-Go was activated, and Chitose headed for the Marianas along with the rest of the 1st Mobile Fleet.

==== Battle of the Philippine Sea ====
With the Marianas campaign underway, the activation of Operation A-Go resulted in the Japanese 1st Mobile Fleet meeting U.S. Navy Task Force 58 in the two-day Battle of the Philippine Sea on 19–20 June 1944. Chitose formed part of the 1st Mobile Fleet's Van Force along with Chiyoda and Zuihō, screened by the battleships Yamato, Musashi, Kongō, and Haruna, four heavy cruisers, a light cruiser, and seven destroyers. On 19 June, the first day of the battle, Chitose participated in airstrikes against Task Force 58, and on 20 June she took part in antiaircraft actions as Task Force 58 aircraft counterattacked. The battle resulted in crippling losses for the Imperial Japanese Navy Air Service, including three aircraft carriers and hundreds of aircraft.

==== June–October 1944 ====
After the Japanese defeat in the Battle of the Philippine Sea, Chitose withdrew, anchoring at Okinawa on 22 June 1944 and getting back underway on the morning of 23 June to return to Japan. She arrived at Kure on 1 July 1944 and remained there for the rest of the month, spending 20–26 July 1944 in drydock at the Kure Naval Arsenal. She was assigned to the 2nd Diversion Attack Force on 3 August 1944, but remained in the Seto Inland Sea and in the waters of Kyushu.

==== Battle of Leyte Gulf ====
After United States Army forces landed on Leyte in the Philippines on 20 October 1944, beginning the Battle of Leyte, Japanese naval forces approached Leyte from several directions to oppose the landings. Among the forces responding was Vice Admiral Jisaburō Ozawa′s Northern Force, consisting of Chitose, the aircraft carriers Chiyoda, Zuikaku, and Zuihō and the hybrid battleship-aircraft carriers Ise and Hyūga, screened by three light cruisers and eight destroyers. After the disastrous losses of aircraft and aircrew in the Battle of the Philippine Sea in June 1944, the Japanese had only 108 aircraft aboard the four aircraft carriers and none on the two battleship-aircraft carriers, and the Northern Force's mission was to serve as decoy, drawing the aircraft carriers of U.S. Navy Task Force 38 northward and away from Leyte, where the Japanese hoped that their battleships, cruisers, and destroyers could destroy the American landing force.

The resulting Battle of Leyte Gulf began on 23 October 1944, and on the afternoon of 24 October American aircraft located Ozawa's force in the Philippine Sea off Luzon's Cape Engaño. Around dawn on 25 October, the Battle off Cape Engaño — one of several actions making up the Battle of Leyte Gulf — began when Ozawa launched a small airstrike against Task Force 38 which suffered heavy losses and accomplished nothing.

Task Force 38 counterattacked with a series of large, punishing airstrikes. During the first strike, Chitose was targeted by planes from the aircraft carrier USS Essex. At 08:35, a line of three large explosions — either torpedo hits or near-misses by bombs — took place on Chitose′s port side forward of the Number 1 aircraft elevator. Boiler rooms 2 and 4 flooded, and Chitose immediately took on a 30-degree list and suffered rudder failure. Her crew succeeded in reducing the list to 15 degrees, but by 08:55 further flooding had increased it to 20 degrees. At 08:55, Chitose's forward starboard engine room flooded, cutting her speed to 14 knots (26 km/h; 16 mph), and her speed subsequently fell further when her after starboard engine failed. When the after port engine room flooded at 09:25, Chitose went dead in the water, and her list grew to 30 degrees. The light cruiser Isuzu attempted to close with her and take her in tow, but it proved impossible.

At 09:37, an hour after her initial wounds, in the Philippine Sea at position 19°20′N 126°20′E, Chitose capsized to port and nosed under, with the loss of 904 men. Isuzu rescued 480 survivors, and the destroyer Shimotsuki rescued 121.

The Japanese struck Chitose from the Navy list on 20 December 1944.

== Bibliography ==
- Lengerer, Hans (2023). The Aircraft Carriers of the Imperial Japanese Navy and Army: Technical and Operational History. Vol. II. Katowice, Poland: Model Hobby. ISBN 978-83-60041-71-0.
- Lengerer, Hans (2021). "Chitose and Chiyoda". In Jordan, John (ed.). Warship 2021. Oxford, UK: Osprey Publishing. pp. 165–179. ISBN 978-1-4728-4779-9.
