= Japanese ship Chiyoda =

Five naval vessels of Japan have been named Chiyoda:

- Japanese gunboat Chiyodagata (1866), Japan's first domestically built, engine-powered warship
- Japanese cruiser Chiyoda (1891), a protected cruiser of the Imperial Japanese Navy during the First Sino-Japanese War, Russo-Japanese War and World War I
- Japanese aircraft carrier Chiyoda (1936), a Chitose-class aircraft carrier of the Imperial Japanese Navy during World War II
- JS Chiyoda (1983), a submarine rescue ship of the Japan Maritime Self-Defense Force, commissioned in 1985 and struck in 2018
- JS Chiyoda (2016), a submarine rescue ship of the Japanese Navy launched in 2016
