= Yoshinao =

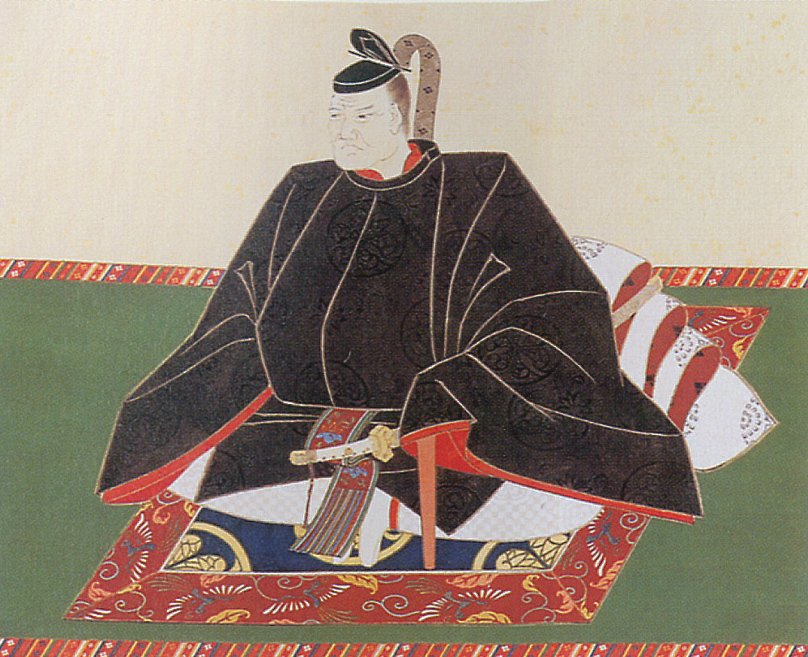
- Yoshinao Tokugawa (1601–1650), Japanese daimyō
- Pronunciation: joɕinao (IPA)
- Gender: Male

Origin
- Origin: Japanese
- Meaning: Different meanings depending on the kanji used

Other names
- Alternative spelling: Yosinao (Kunrei-shiki) Yosinao (Nihon-shiki) Yoshinao (Hepburn)

Yoshinao is a masculine Japanese given name.

== Written forms ==
Yoshinao can be written using different combinations of kanji characters. Here are some examples:

- 義直, "justice, frankness"
- 義尚, "justice, still"
- 佳直, "skilled, frankness"
- 佳尚, "skilled, still"
- 善直, "virtuous, frankness"
- 善尚, "virtuous, still"
- 吉直, "good luck, frankness"
- 吉尚, "good luck, still"
- 良直, "good, frankness"
- 良尚, "good, still"
- 恭直, "respectful, frankness"
- 嘉直, "excellent, frankness"
- 嘉尚, "excellent, still"
- 能直, "capacity, frankness"
- 喜直, "rejoice, frankness"

The name can also be written in hiragana よしなお or katakana ヨシナオ.

== Notable people with the name ==
- Yoshinao Kamata (釜田 佳直) (born 1993), Japanese baseball player
- Yoshinao Kodaira (小平 好直) (1918–2008), Japanese World War II flying ace
- Yoshinao Nakada (中田 喜直) (1923–2000), Japanese composer
- Yoshinao Tokugawa (徳川 義直) (1601–1650), Japanese daimyō
