= Japanese seaplane carrier Nisshin =

Ship of the Imperial Japanese Navy

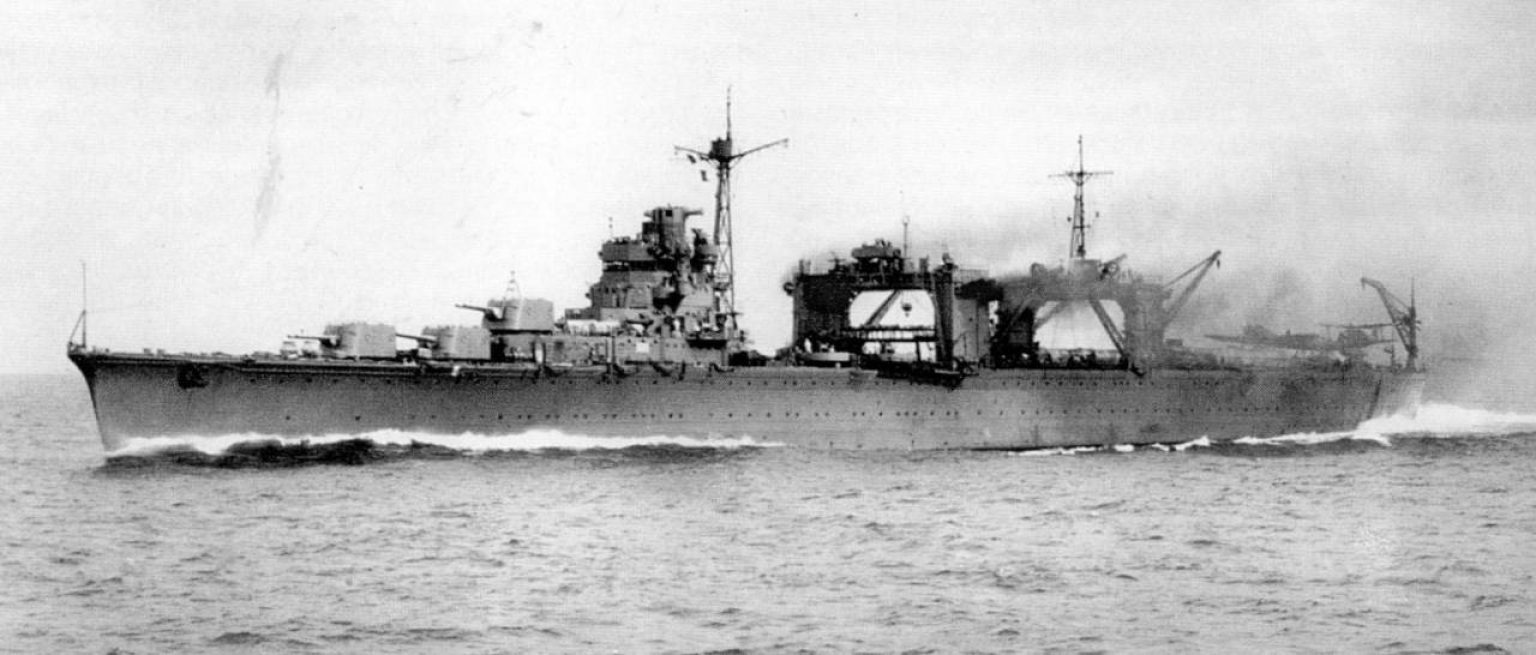
- Nisshin in 1942

History

Japan
- Name: Nisshin
- Ordered: 1937
- Builder: Kure Naval Arsenal
- Laid down: 2 November 1938
- Launched: 30 November 1939
- Commissioned: 27 February 1942
- Fate: Sunk in combat 22 July 1943; 6°35′S 156°10′E

General characteristics
- Class & type: Nisshin-class seaplane tender
- Displacement: 11,317 long tons (11,499 t) (standard); 12,500 long tons (12,701 t) (full load)
- Length: 192.5 m (631 ft 7 in) OA; 174 m (570 ft 10 in) P-P
- Beam: 19.71 m (64 ft 8 in)
- Draft: 7.0 m (23 ft 0 in)
- Installed power: 47,000 shp (35,000 kW)
- Propulsion: 2 × geared steam turbines; 2 × shafts
- Speed: 28 kn (52 km/h; 32 mph)
- Complement: 633 (in 1943); 789 (maximum)
- Armament: 6 × 14 cm/50 3rd Year Type naval guns (3 × 2); 24 × Type 96 25 mm AA guns (8 × 3); 2 × Yamanouchi 5 cm salute guns (2 × 1)
- Aircraft carried: 12 × floatplanes
- Aviation facilities: 2 × aircraft catapults

Nisshin (日進) was a seaplane tender (AV) of the Imperial Japanese Navy during World War II.

She was built at Kure Naval Arsenal from 1938 to 1942 and was equipped with two aircraft catapults and facilities for launching, lifting, and carrying up to 12 floatplanes. She also could carry, launch, recover, and support 12 Type 'A' midget submarines.

== Background ==
During the 1930s, the Imperial Japanese Navy made increasing use of naval aviation as scouts for its cruiser and destroyer squadrons. Due to restrictions imposed by the Washington Naval Treaty and London Naval Treaty, the number of aircraft carriers was strictly regulated; however, there was no limitation as to seaplane tenders. Nisshin was a follow-on to the purpose-built seaplane tender design begun with the Chitose-class and was ordered by the Imperial Japanese Navy under the 3rd Naval Armaments Supplement Programme of 1937.

== Design ==
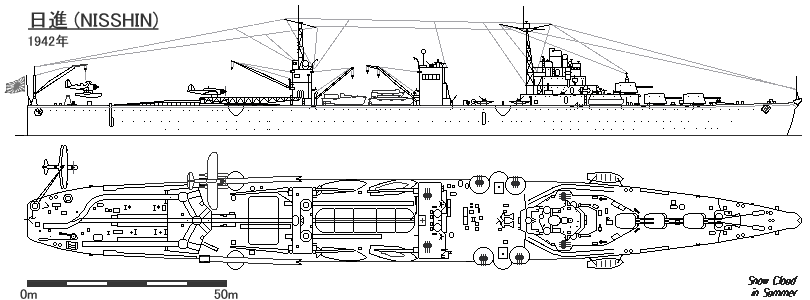
Nisshin in 1942

Nisshin was designed with two aircraft catapults for launching seaplanes, and cranes for recovering landed aircraft on her aft deck. She also had two elevators to transport midget submarines from the ship's interior along with 900 tonnes of aviation fuel. As designed, Nisshin carried a complement of 12 Kawanishi E7K Type 94 "Alf", Nakajima E8N Type 95 "Dave" and Mitsubishi F1M Type 0 "Pete" floatplanes which were stored on the top of the ship.

Her armament consisted of six 14 cm/50 3rd Year Type naval guns in three turrets on the foredeck, giving Nisshin nearly the firepower of a light cruiser. Anti-aircraft protection was initially provided by 24 Type 96 25 mm AA guns in eight triple mountings. Nisshin was modified after the start of World War II to carry twelve Type A Kō-hyōteki-class submarines, with a reduction in her original aircraft capacity to twelve aircraft.

Although similar to the preceding seaplane carrier Chitose and Mizuho, Nisshin was fitted with more powerful 47,000 bhp, two-shafted engines which enabled it to reach speeds of 28 knots. Nisshin had a range of 11,000 nautical miles at 18 knots, and was often used on high speed transport missions to get more equipment and reinforcements to designated areas quickly.

== Operational history ==
Nisshin was laid down on 2 November 1938 and launched on 30 November 1939 at Kure Naval Arsenal. Her completion was delayed by design changes and the onset of the Pacific War and was not commissioned until 27 February 1942. Shortly after commissioning, on 20 March 1942 Nisshin was assigned to Vice Admiral Teruhisa Komatsu’s IJN 6th Fleet together with the seaplane tender Chiyoda and the auxiliary cruiser Aikoku Maru, and participated in training exercises in the Inland Sea, during which time she recovered a miniature submarine which had been lost by Chiyoda.

During the Battle of Midway, Nisshin was part of Main Body of the Japanese fleet. For this operation, she carried twelve Type A Kō-hyōteki-class midget submarines, which were intended to be stationed at Kure Atoll, which was to be seized as a seaplane base for operations against Midway Atoll. The operation was cancelled on the loss of the Japanese aircraft carriers during the Battle of Midway, and Nisshin returned to Hashirajima with her submarines on 14 June without having seen combat.

From September 1942, Nisshin was at Kavieng in the Solomon Islands, where she was assigned to a number of Tokyo Express high speed transport runs to Guadalcanal through the end of November. These missions included the transport of artillery. On 28 September, she narrowly missed an attack by USS Sculpin east of the island of Kokoda. In October, she was damaged during an attack by an American dive bomber north of Tassafaronga. She was unloading at Tassafaronga during a subsequent run on 12 October when the Battle of Cape Esperance began, but was able with withdraw without engaging in combat and in November she was withdrawn to Truk.

During the first half of 1943, Nisshin continued to be used primarily as a fast transport between the Japanese home islands and Truk and Rabaul.

With the start of the large-scale Allied offensive in June 1943 against Japanese-occupied New Georgia and the Solomon Islands, Nisshin rushed troop reinforcements from Yokosuka to Bougainville Island. Loaded with 630 soldiers, 22 light tanks, ammunition and food supplies, she stopped at Truk and on 22 July, escorted by three destroyers, Nisshin attempted to run Bougainville Strait towards Buin. The convoy was attacked at 13:45 approximately 40 nautical miles (74 km; 46 mi) southwest of Buin by three waves of American bombers, including 34 Douglas SBD Dauntless and twelve Consolidated B-24 Liberator bombers. Nisshin was able to evade the B-24s, working up to 34 knots, but was hit by four 500-pound (230 kg) and two 1,000-pound (450 kg) bombs dropped by the dive bombers during the second and third strikes, which exploded her aviation fuel stores and caused many casualties among the crowded soldiers. Severely damaged, Nisshin capsized to starboard and sank some fourteen minutes after the start of the air raid. Of the 1263 on board at the time (633 crewmen and 630 embarked troops), only 178 were rescued by the escorting destroyers, their efforts severely hampered by renewed air attacks.

On 10 September 1943, Nisshin was struck from the navy list.
