= Kodaira (disambiguation) =

Kodaira is a city near Tokyo, Japan.

It may also refer to:

- Kodaira (surname)
- 6500 Kodaira

== See also ==
- Enriques–Kodaira classification, a classification of complex surfaces
- Kodaira's classification of singular fibers, which classifies the possible fibers of an elliptic fibration
