= Japanese cruiser Miyako =

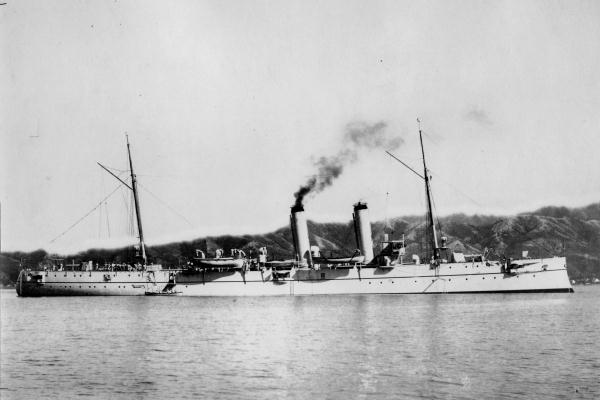
- Miyako in 1902

History

Empire of Japan
- Name: Miyako
- Ordered: 1893 Fiscal Year
- Builder: Kure Shipyards, Japan
- Laid down: 26 May 1894
- Launched: 27 October 1898
- Completed: 31 March 1899
- Stricken: 21 May 1905
- Fate: Sunk by mine 14 May 1904

General characteristics
- Type: Unprotected cruiser
- Displacement: 1,772 long tons (1,800 t)
- Length: 314 ft (95.7 m)
- Beam: 34 ft (10.4 m)
- Draft: 14 ft (4.3 m)
- Propulsion: 2-shaft reciprocating VTE, 6,130 ihp (4,570 kW), 8 locomotive boilers, 400 tons coal
- Speed: 20 knots (23 mph; 37 km/h)
- Complement: 200
- Armament: 2 × QF 4.7 inch Gun Mk I–IVs; 8 × QF 3 pounder Hotchkiss guns; 2 × 18 in (460 mm) torpedo tubes

Miyako (宮古) was an unprotected cruiser of the early Imperial Japanese Navy. The name Miyako comes from the Miyako Islands, one of the three island groups making up current Okinawa prefecture. Miyako was used by the Imperial Japanese Navy primarily as an aviso (dispatch boat) for scouting, reconnaissance and delivery of high priority messages.

== Background ==
Miyako was designed under the supervision of French naval architect Émile Bertin, and built in Japan by the Kure Shipyards. With a small displacement, powerful engines, and a 20-knot (37 km/h) speed, the lightly armed and lightly armored Miyako was an example of the Jeune Ecole philosophy of naval warfare advocated by Bertin. Due to her small size the ship is sometimes classified as a corvette or gunboat.

== Design ==
Similar in design to Yaeyama and the French unprotected cruiser Milan (1885), Miyako was the first warship produced by the new Kure Naval Arsenal. She had a steel hull, and retained two masts for auxiliary sail propulsion in addition to her steam engine. Miyako was armed with two QF 4.7-inch Gun Mk I–IVs guns and eight QF 3 pounder Hotchkiss guns. In addition, she carried two torpedoes, mounted on the deck.

== Service record ==
Miyako was laid down on 26 May 1894, launched 27 October 1898 and completed on 31 March 1899. The ship was not completed in time for the First Sino-Japanese War. From June 1900 to October 1902, she was under the command of Commander Yashiro Rokurō.

During the Russo-Japanese War of 1904–1905, Miyako participated in the naval Battle of Port Arthur and subsequent blockade of that port under the command of Commander Tochinai Sōjirō. While engaged in a survey of Dairen Harbor in search of a suitable landing place for the ground forces of the Imperial Japanese Army's IJA 2nd Army, Miyako struck a mine and sank within minutes on the night of 14 May 1904, with the loss of two crewmen. She was officially struck from the navy list on 21 May 1905. Her wreckage was raised and sold for scrap on 4 July 1906.
