= Kodaira (surname) =

Kodaira (written: 小平) is a Japanese surname. Notable people with the surname include:

- Kunihiko Kodaira (小平 邦彦; 1915–1997), Japanese mathematician and Fields medalist
- Nao Kodaira (小平 奈緒; born 1986), Japanese speed skater and Olympic gold medalist
- Tadamasa Kodaira (小平 忠正; born 1942), Japanese politician
- Yoshinao Kodaira (小平 好直; 1918–2008), Japanese World War II flying ace
- Yoshio Kodaira (小平 義雄; 1905–1949), Japanese serial killer
