= Bombing of Kure =

Parts of World War II

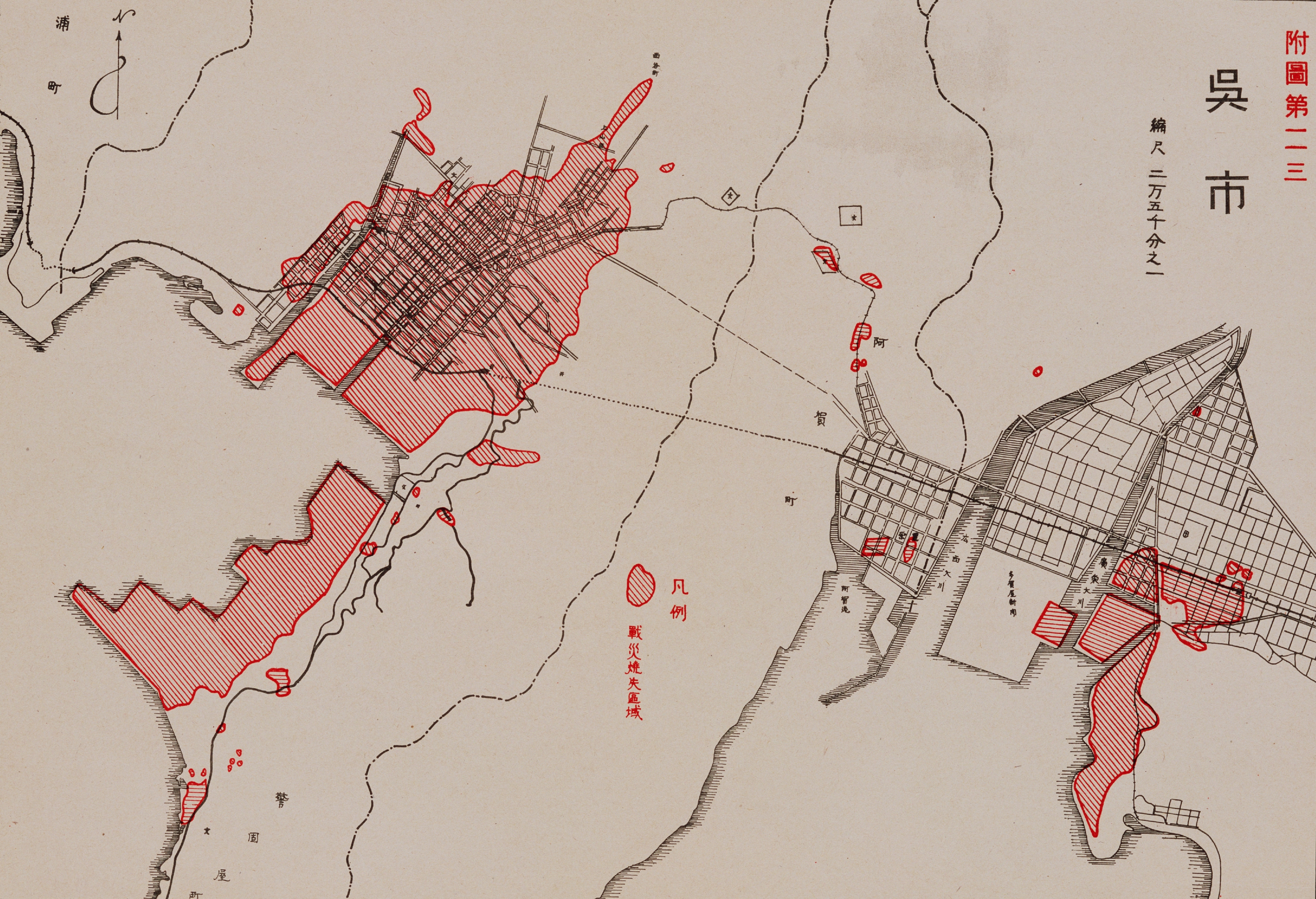
Map showing the areas of Kure destroyed by bombing during the Pacific War (1945)

The bombing of Kure (Kure kūshū) took place by allied aircraft during air raids on Japan in the Pacific War in 1945. These raids targeted the major naval base located at the city, ships moored at this base or nearby, industrial facilities, and the city's urban area itself.

The following major attacks were conducted on Kure and the nearby region:

- 19 March 1945 – Attack on warships at and near Kure by the United States Navy's Task Force 58
- 30 March 1945 – B-29 Superfortress heavy bombers laid mines in the approaches to Kure and Hiroshima
- Early April 1945 – Further minelaying by B-29s in the approaches to Kure and Kure harbour
- 5 May 1945 – Raid by 148 B-29 Superfortress heavy bombers on the Hiro Naval Aircraft Factory at Kure
- 5 May 1945 – B-29s laid mines in the approaches to Kure and Hiroshima
- 22 June 1945 – Raid by B-29 Superfortress heavy bombers on the Kure Naval Arsenal
- 1 July 1945 – Firebombing raid by B-29 Superfortress heavy bombers on Kure destroyed 40 percent of the city
- 24 and 28 July – Large-scale attacks on ships at Kure by the United States Navy, with the US Navy and British Pacific Fleet also striking ships in the Inland Sea area.
- 28 July 1945 – Raid by 79 B-24 Liberator heavy bombers on ships anchored at Kure

== See also ==
- Air raids on Japan
- Evacuations of civilians in Japan during World War II
