= Kure Naval Arsenal =

Former Japanese naval shipyard

Coordinates: 34.232°N 132.554°E

- Kure, Hiroshima Prefecture, Japan
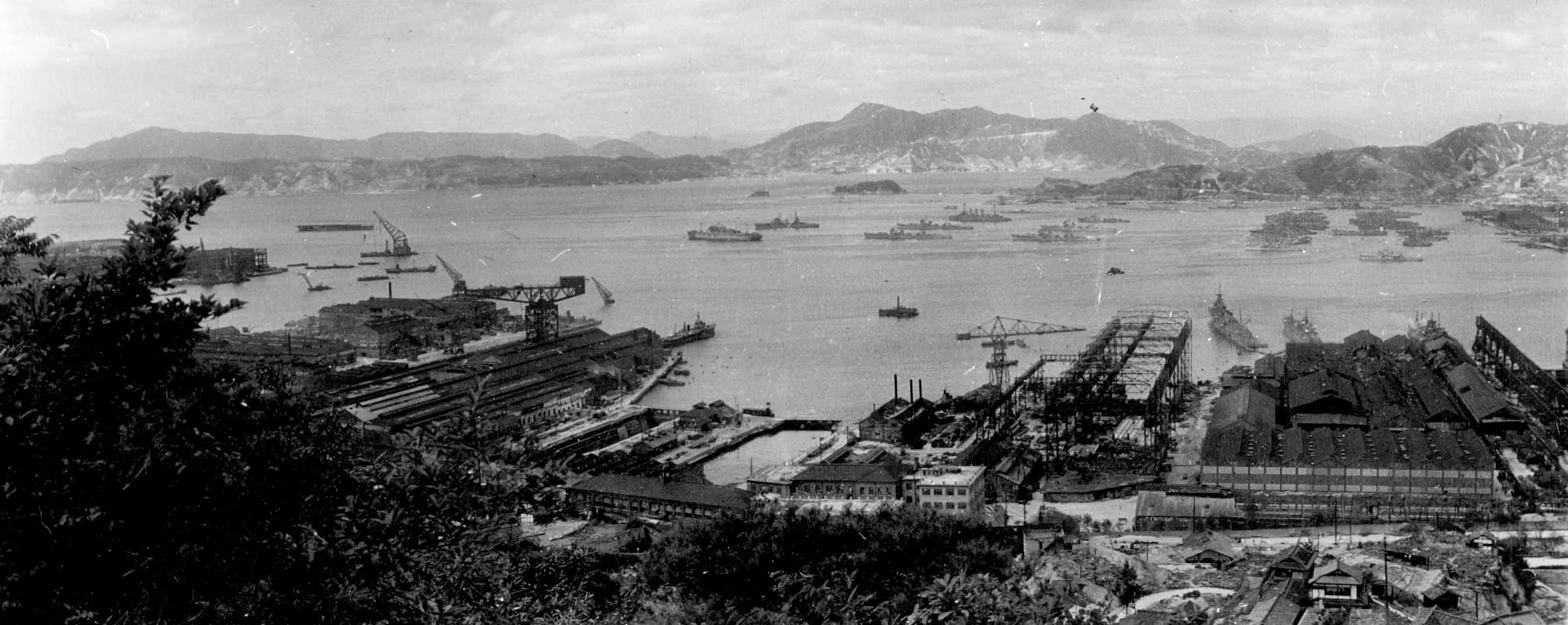
- Kure Naval Arsenal panorama, 1945

Site information
- Type: Shipyard
- Controlled by: Imperial Japanese Navy

Site history
- Built: 1889
- In use: 1889–1945

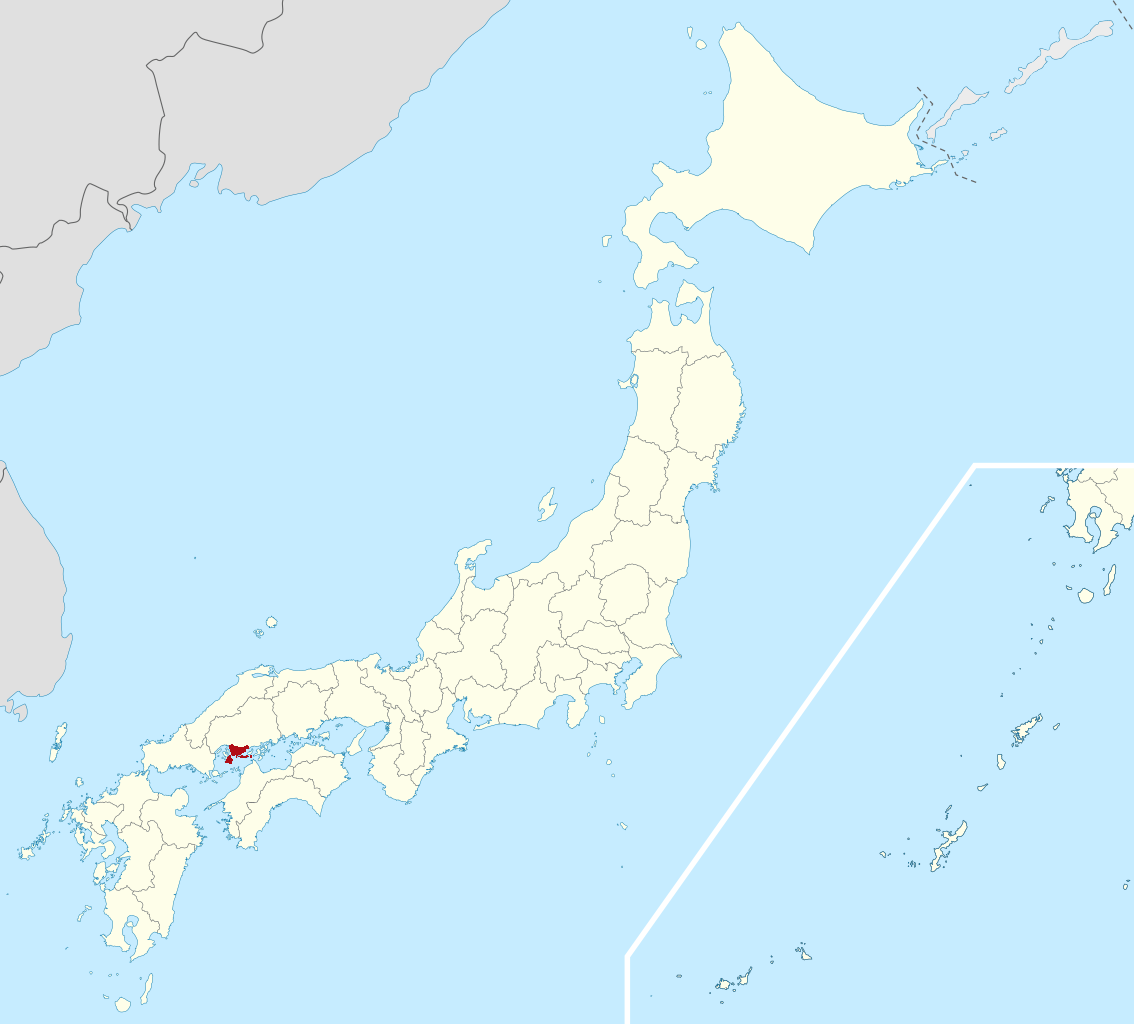
Kure location map

Kure Naval Arsenal (呉海軍工廠, Kure Kaigun Kōshō) was one of four principal naval shipyards owned and operated by the Imperial Japanese Navy.

== History ==
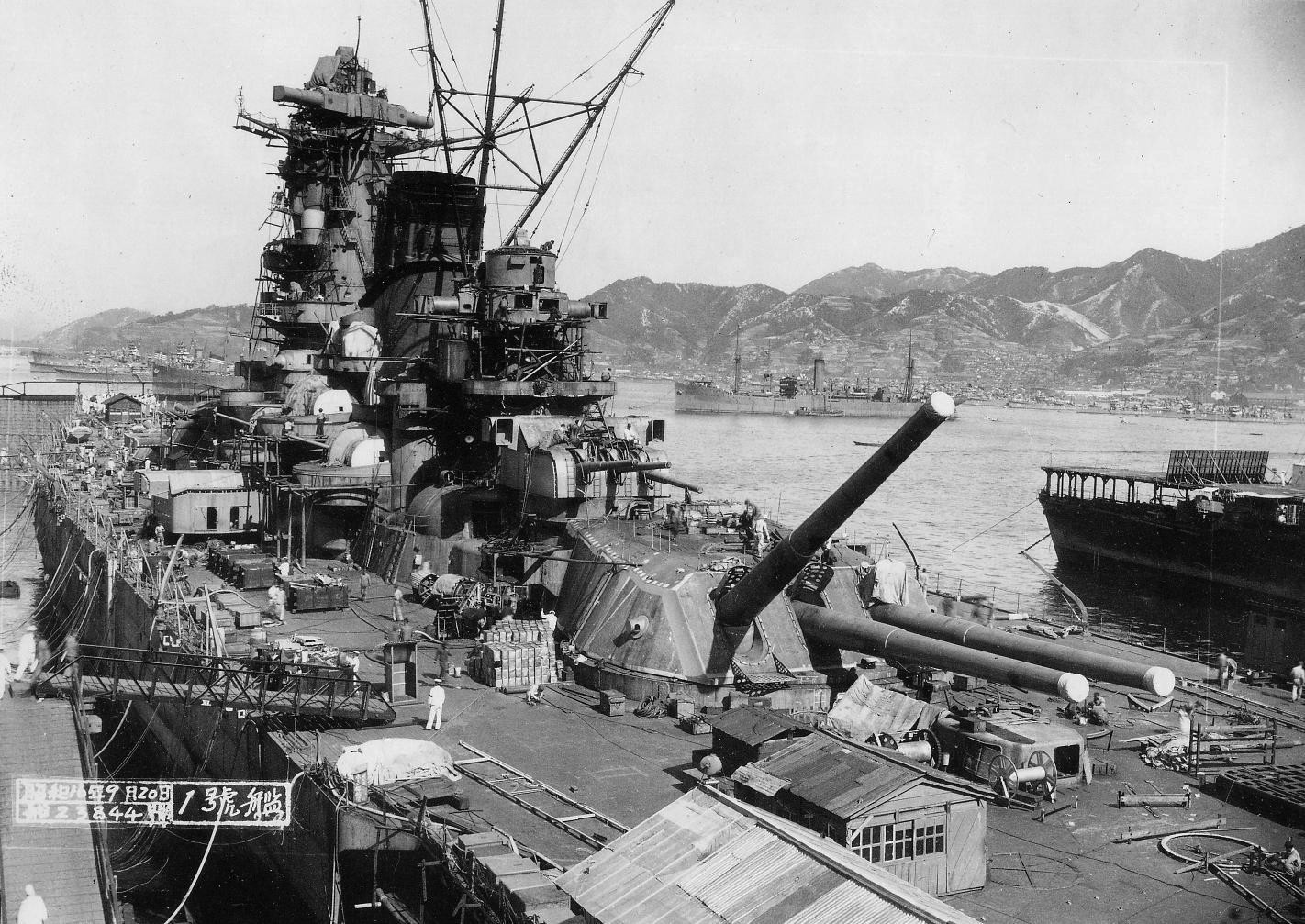
Battleship Yamato under construction at Kure Naval Arsenal, 1941

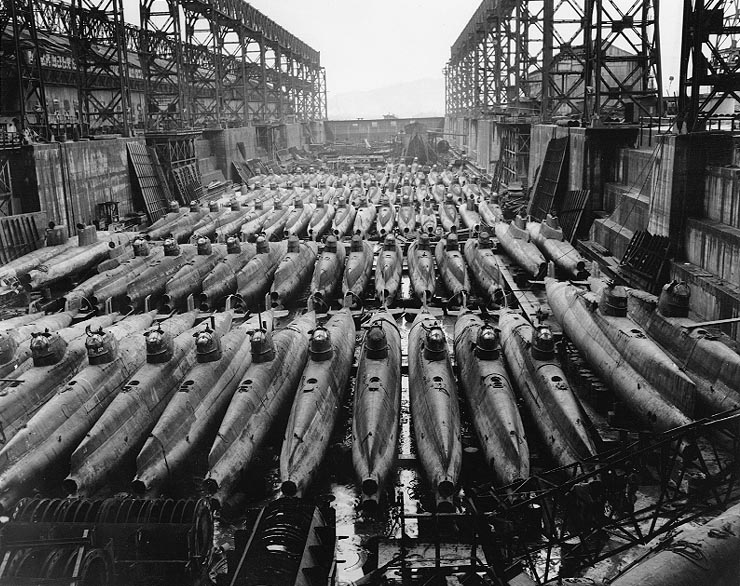
Midget submarines in a drydock at Kure, 1945

The Kure Naval District was established at Kure, Hiroshima in 1889, as the second of the naval districts responsible for the defense of the Japanese home islands. Along with the establishment of the navy base, a ship repair facility was also constructed, initially by moving the equipment from the Onohama shipyards near Kobe. Construction was supervised by the French engineer Louis-Émile Bertin. The first warship constructed at Kure, Miyako, was launched in 1897. The "Kure Shipyards" were officially renamed the "Kure Naval Arsenal" in 1903.

Kure developed into one of the largest shipbuilding facilities in the Empire of Japan, capable of working with the largest vessels. The Arsenal included a major steel works (built with British assistance), and also facilities for producing naval artillery and projectiles. The battleships Yamato and Nagato were designed and constructed at Kure.

The facilities of the Kure Naval Arsenal were repeatedly bombed by the United States Navy and United States Army Air Forces during the Pacific War, and over 70% of its buildings and equipment was destroyed.

After the surrender of Japan in 1945, the Kure Naval Arsenal was turned over to civilian hands.

== Current facilities ==
The extensive dry dock, ship building, repair and engineering facilities are now owned and operated by Japan Marine United, one of Japan's largest merchant marine and naval shipbuilders.

== Examples of ships built at Kure Naval Arsenal ==
=== Battleships ===
- Yamato, Yamato-class battleship (1941)
- Nagato, Nagato-class battleship (1920)
- Settsu, Kawachi-class battleship (1912)

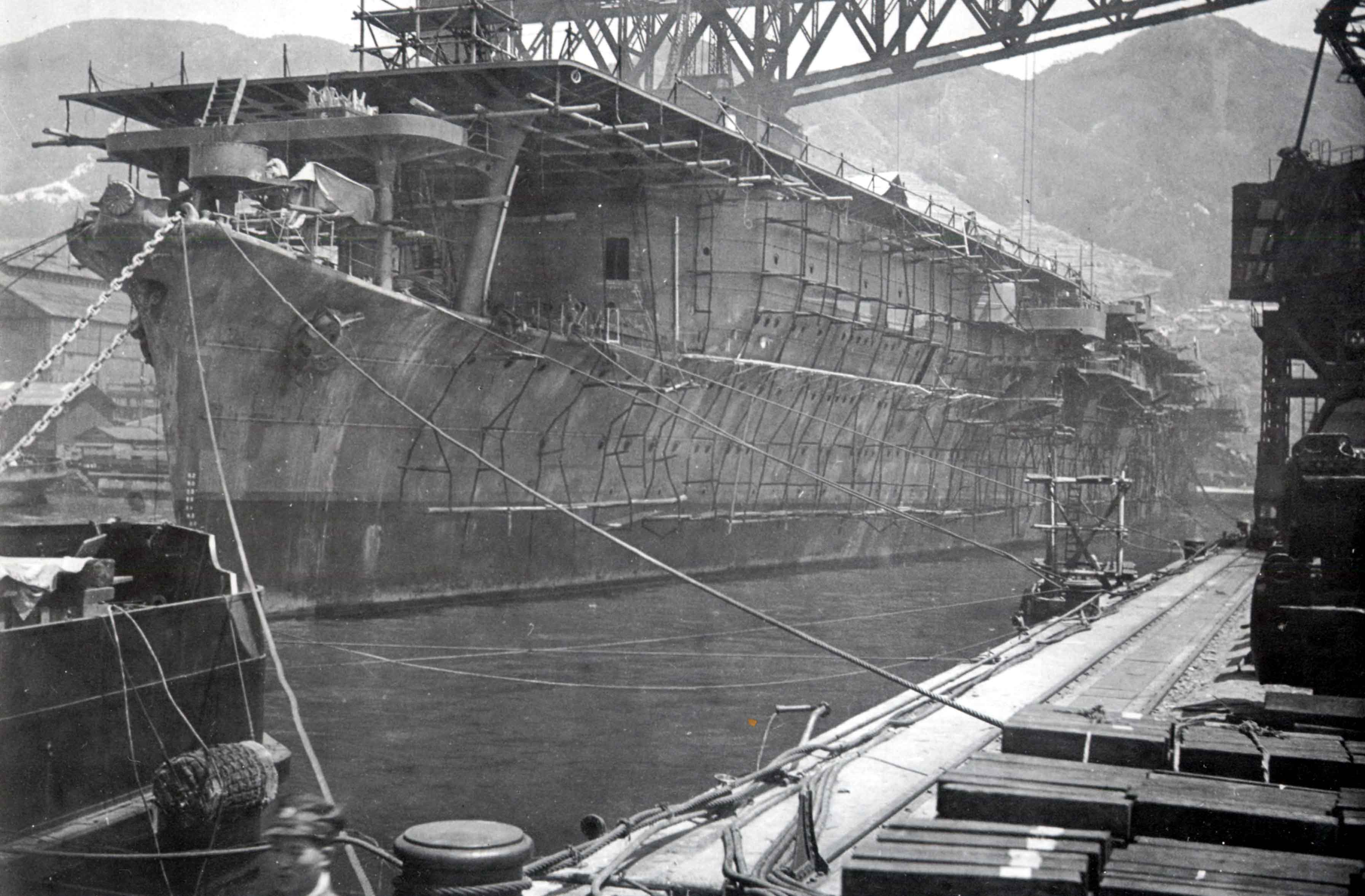
Aircraft carrier Sōryū nearing completion, 1937

=== Battlecruiser/Armoured Cruiser ===
- Akagi, Amagi-class battlecruiser/Akagi-class aircraft carrier (1925)
- Ibuki, Ibuki-class battlecruiser (1909)
- Tsukuba, Tsukuba-class battlecruiser (1907)

=== Aircraft Carriers ===
- Katsuragi, Unryū-class aircraft carrier (1945)
- Fleet carrier Sōryū (1937)
- Un'yō, Taiyō-class escort carrier (1942)

=== Cruisers ===
- Atago, Takao-class heavy cruiser (1932)
- Nachi, Myōkō-class heavy cruiser (1928)
- Light cruiser Ōyodo (1943)

=== Destroyers ===
- Ariake, Fubuki, Arare, Harusame-class Destroyers (1905)

=== Submarines ===
- I-400-class submarine
- I-201-class submarine

=== Seaplane Tenders ===
- Chitose, Chitose-class seaplane tender (1936)
- Chiyoda, Chitose-class seaplane tender (1937)

== Naval Weapons designed at Kure ==
=== Naval Gun ===
- 40(46) cm/45 Type 94 naval gun, main armament of the Yamato-class battleship
- 10 cm/65 Type 98 naval gun, main armament of the Akizuki-class destroyer and Secondary armament of light cruiser Ōyodo and aircraft carrier Taihō

== See also ==
- Bombing of Kure (July 1945)
