= Japanese seaplane carrier Mizuho =

Seaplane carrier of the Imperial Japanese Navy

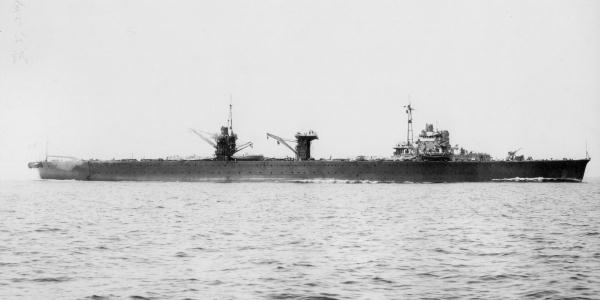
- Mizuho off Tateyama, Japan, in 1940.

History

Empire of Japan
- Name: Mizuho
- Builder: Kawasaki Shipyards
- Laid down: 1 May 1937
- Launched: 16 May 1938
- Commissioned: 25 February 1939
- Fate: Torpedoed and sunk, 2 May 1942

General characteristics
- Type: Seaplane carrier
- Displacement: 10,930 tons standard
- Length: 183.6 m (602 ft 4 in) (waterline)
- Beam: 18.8 m (61 ft 8 in)
- Propulsion: 2-shaft diesel engines, 15,200 bhp (11,300 kW)
- Speed: 22 knots (41 km/h; 25 mph)
- Armament: 6 × 12.7 cm/40 Type 89 naval guns; 20 × Type 96 25 mm AA guns
- Aircraft carried: 24 seaplanes

Mizuho (瑞穂, "Fresh Grain") was a seaplane carrier of the Imperial Japanese Navy during World War II. The ship was built at Kawasaki Shipbuilding at Kobe, Japan, and was completed in February 1939.

== Design and description ==
Mizuho was built to a similar design as the seaplane carrier Chitose, but with slightly less powerful diesel engines instead of Chitose's turbines. She carried 24 seaplanes, and was equipped to carry twelve miniature submarines, although she could not carry full loads of both at one time.

== Service history ==
Mizuho participated in invasion support for much of her career; her first mission was with the Fourth Surprise Attack Force. On 1 March 1942, planes from Mizuho and Chitose damaged the American destroyer USS Pope, which was later sunk by aircraft from the aircraft carrier Ryūjō and gunfire from the heavy cruisers Ashigara and Myōkō.

=== Sinking ===
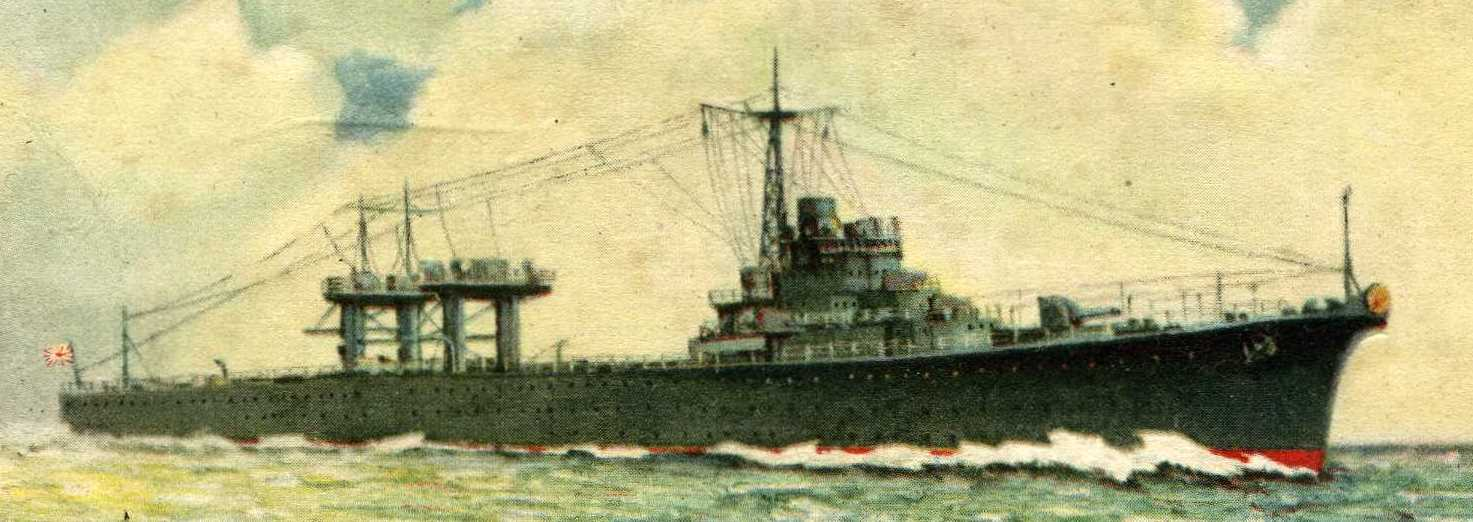
Painting of Mizuho

The American submarine USS Drum torpedoed Mizuho at 23:03 hours on 1 May 1942 40 nautical miles (74 km; 46 mi) off Omaezaki, Japan. She capsized and sank at 04:16 hours on 2 May 1942 with the loss of 101 lives. There were 472 survivors, of which 31 were wounded.
