= Chitose-class aircraft carrier =

Imperial Japanese warships (1938–1944)

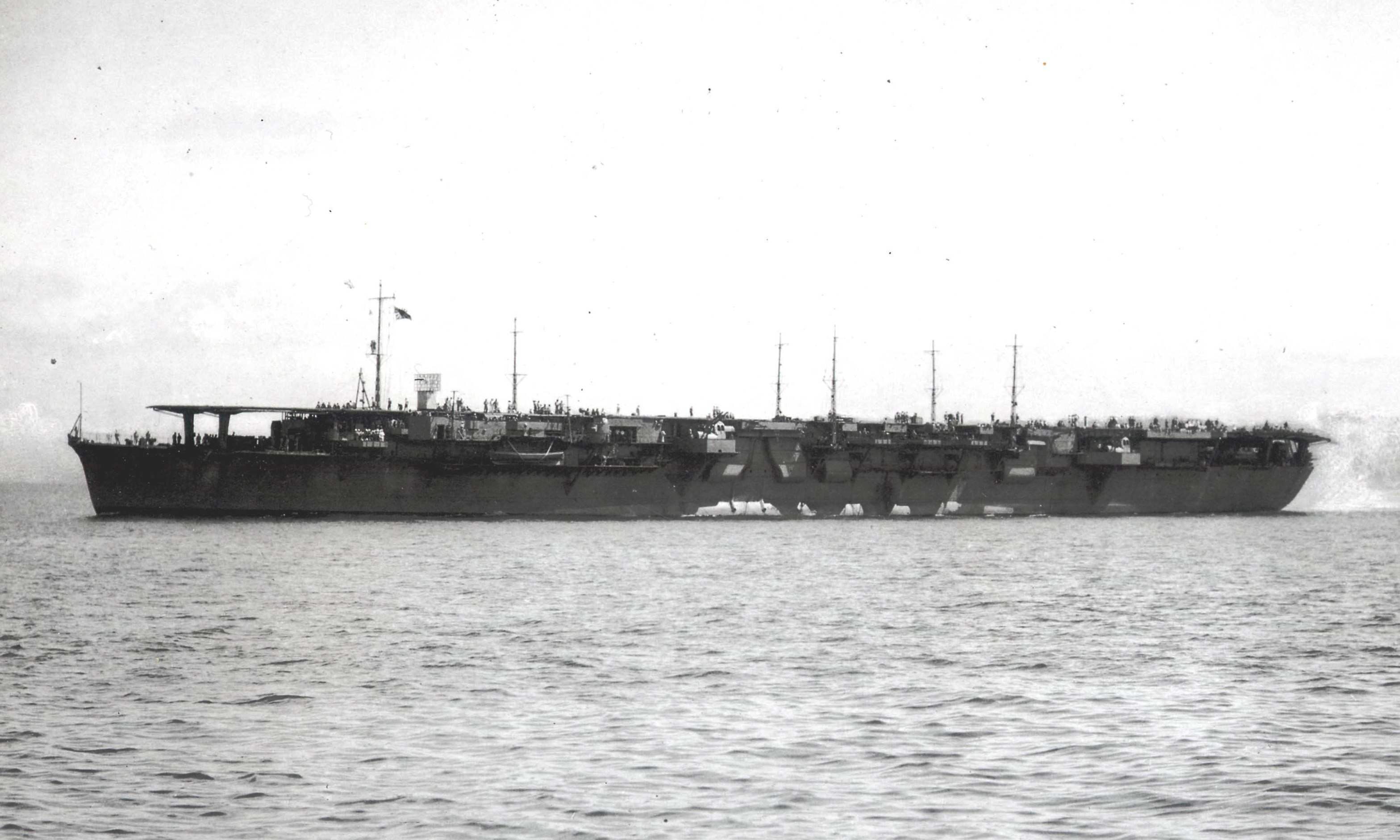
- Chitose

Class overview
- Name: Chitose class
- Operators: Imperial Japanese Navy
- Completed: 2
- Lost: 2

General characteristics
- Displacement: 11,190 long tons (11,370 t) (standard); 15,300 long tons (15,500 t) (full load)
- Length: 192.5 m (631 ft 7 in) (o/a)
- Beam: 20.8 m (68 ft 3 in) at waterline
- Draught: 7.51 m (24 ft 8 in)
- Installed power: 56,800 shp (42,400 kW); 4 boilers
- Speed: 28.9 knots (53.5 km/h; 33.3 mph)
- Range: 5,000 nmi (9,300 km; 5,800 mi)
- Complement: 800
- Armament: 8 × 12.7cm/40 caliber guns; 30 × Type 96 25 mm (0.98 in) AA guns
- Aircraft carried: 30

The Chitose-class aircraft carriers (千歳型航空母艦, Chitose-gata kōkūbokan) were a class of two seaplane tenders, later converted to light aircraft carriers, of the Imperial Japanese Navy during World War II. Under the terms of the Washington Naval Treaty, the total tonnage of Japan's naval vessels was limited by class. The Chitose-class ships were built as seaplane tenders, designed to make the conversion to aircraft carriers relatively easy. They served as seaplane tenders during the early part of the Pacific War. After the Battle of Midway, they were converted into light aircraft carriers. Both ships participated in the Battle of the Philippine Sea and both were sunk in the Battle of Leyte Gulf.

Chitose (千歳) underwent conversion at the Sasebo Naval Yard and was completed on New Years Day, 1944. Her sister ship Chiyoda (千代田) was completed approximately two months earlier at the Yokosuka Naval Yard. Both ships were outfitted with a single hangar and they were widened by an additional 6 feet 7 inches (2.0 m). The added flight deck was serviced by two lifts.

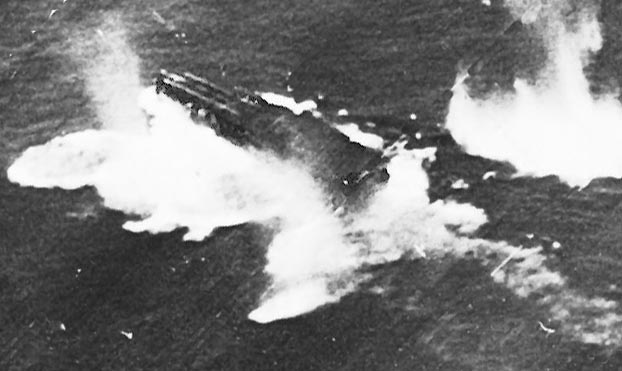
Chitose-class aircraft carrier under attack, 25 October 1944

Chitose and Chiyoda were sunk at the Battle off Cape Engaño, which occurred during the Imperial Japanese Navy's "Sho-Go" operation that produced the Battle of Leyte Gulf. In charge of the operation was Vice Admiral Jisaburo Ozawa, commander of the operation's northern force. Ozawa's was a desperate mission—provide an attractive target for U.S. Admiral William F. Halsey's Third Fleet, hopefully pulling the powerful American "fast carriers" north so that Japanese surface ships could slip in and attack U.S. invasion forces off Leyte. His ships were not expected to survive their diversionary employment. Together with two other carriers in the group, they carried only 116 planes, much less than their normal capacity and far less than the aircraft of Halsey's task forces.

Despite their role as "bait", the Japanese carriers sighted Halsey first and launched a strike in the late morning of 24 October. This accomplished nothing, and only a few planes returned to the carriers, leaving them with less than thirty. The Japanese ships tried hard to be conspicuous, and U.S. aircraft finally spotted them in mid-afternoon. Admiral Halsey, believing that his aviators had driven the other Japanese forces away, headed north to attack.

At about 08:00 on the morning of 25 October, American carrier planes began a series of attacks and sank Chitose. A second strike came in around 10:00 that damaged Chiyoda and slowed her down. She was later sunk by gunfire from four cruisers and nine destroyers under the command of Rear Admiral Laurance DuBose that had been detached from Halsey's Third Fleet to sail north and engage the Japanese.

== Ships ==
Construction data
Name	Builder	Laid down	Launched	Commissioned	Recommissioned	Fate
Chitose (千歳)	Kure Naval Arsenal	26 November 1934	29 November 1936	25 July 1938	1 November 1943	Sunk during the Battle off Cape Engaño, 25 October 1944
Chiyoda (千代田)	Kure Naval Arsenal	14 December 1936	19 November 1937	15 December 1938	21 December 1943	Sunk during the Battle off Cape Engaño, 25 October 1944
