= Yoshinao Kodaira =

Japanese fighter pilot

- 小平 好直
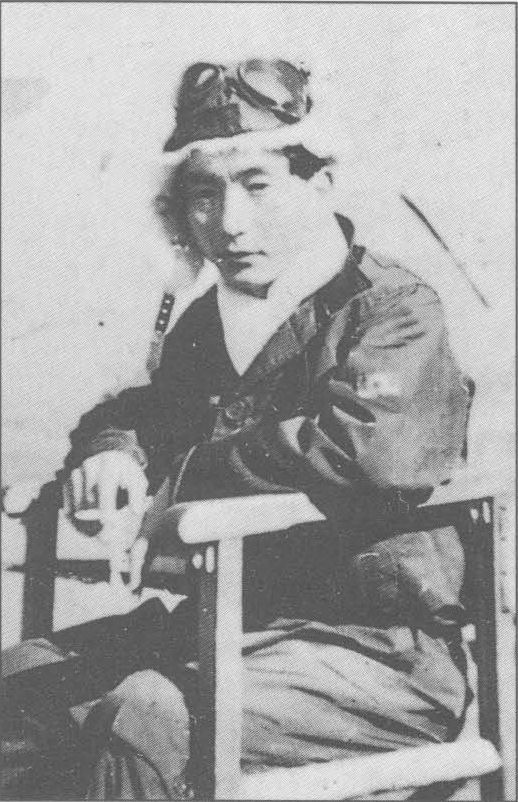
- Born: 1918; Nagano, Japan
- Died: July 14, 2008 (aged 89–90)
- Military career
- Allegiance: Empire of Japan
- Branch: Imperial Japanese Navy Air Service (IJN)
- Service years: 1935–1945
- Conflicts: Second Sino-Japanese War; World War II; Battle of the Coral Sea; Solomon Islands campaign; Guadalcanal Campaign; Battle of the Eastern Solomons; Battle of the Philippine Sea; Battle of Leyte Gulf; Battle of Leyte
- Other work: Japan Air Self-Defense Force

Yoshinao Kodaira (小平 好直, Kodaira Yoshinao; 1918 – July 14, 2008) was an officer and ace fighter pilot in the Imperial Japanese Navy during World War II. Participating in many of the Pacific War battles and campaigns as a member of several units, including the fighter units of the aircraft carriers Shōkaku and Chiyoda, Kodaira was officially credited with destroying 13 enemy aircraft. After the war, he served with the Japan Air Self-Defense Force. In 2008, Tsubasa-kai ("Wings Association"), the veterans' organization of the JASDF, reported his death on its website.
