= Japanese aircraft carrier Chiyoda =

Light aircraft carrier of the Imperial Japanese Navy during World War II

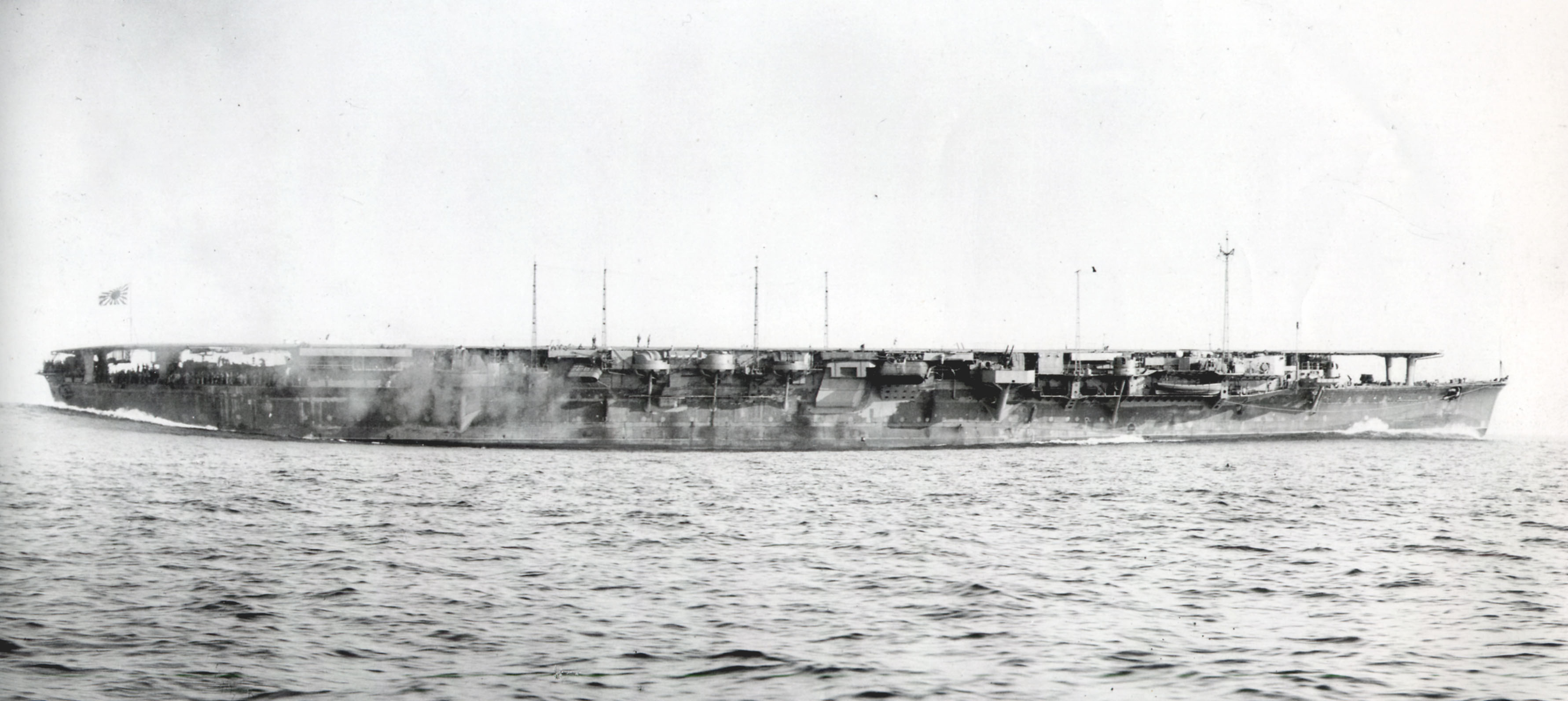
- Chiyoda in 1944 after conversion into an aircraft carrier

History

Japan
- Name: Chiyoda
- Namesake: Chiyoda, Tokyo
- Ordered: 1934
- Builder: Kure Naval Arsenal
- Laid down: 14 December 1936 as seaplane carrier
- Launched: 19 November 1937
- Commissioned: 15 December 1938
- Recommissioned: 21 December 1943
- Reclassified: 15 December 1943 as light carrier
- Refit: 1942 to 1944
- Fate: Sunk during the Battle of Leyte Gulf, 25 October 1944

General characteristics
- Class & type: Chitose-class aircraft carrier
- Displacement: 11,200 long tons (11,400 t) (standard); 15,300 long tons (15,500 t) (full load)
- Length: 192.5 m (631 ft 7 in)
- Beam: 20.8 m (68 ft 3 in)
- Draft: 7.5 m (24 ft 7 in)
- Installed power: 56,000 shp (42,000 kW)
- Propulsion: 2 × geared steam turbines; 2 × shafts
- Speed: 28.9 knots (53.5 km/h; 33.3 mph)
- Complement: 800
- Armament: Seaplane tender: 4 × 12.7 cm/40 Type 89 naval guns; 12 × Type 96 25 mm AA gunss; Aircraft carrier 8 × 12.7 cm/40 Type 89 naval guns; 30–48 × Type 96 25 mm AA guns
- Aircraft carried: Seaplane tender 24 × floatplanes; Aircraft carrier: 30 × aircraft
- Aviation facilities: Seaplane tender: 4 × catapults; Aircraft carrier: 2 × elevators

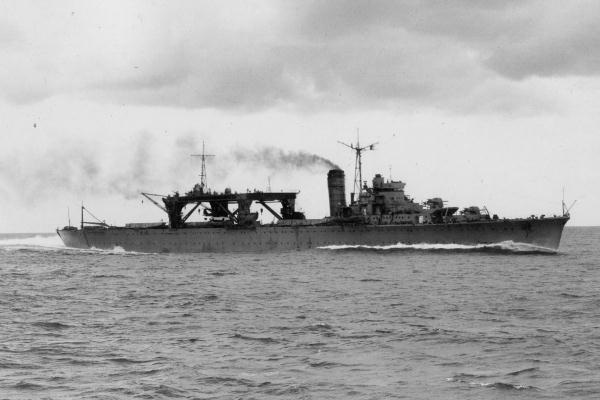
Japanese seaplane tender Chiyoda in 1938

Chiyoda (千代田, "Thousandth-Generation Field") was a light aircraft carrier of the Imperial Japanese Navy during World War II. Originally constructed as the second vessel of the Chitose-class seaplane tenders in 1934, she continued to operate in that capacity during the Second Sino-Japanese War and the early stages of the Pacific War until her conversion into a light aircraft carrier after the Battle of Midway. She was sunk during the Battle of Leyte Gulf by a combination of naval bombers, cruiser shellfire and destroyer-launched torpedoes.

== Background ==
The Chitose-class seaplane tenders were procured by the Imperial Japanese Navy under the 2nd Naval Armaments Supplement Programme of 1934 as purpose-built ships, whereas their predecessors were all conversions of merchant or auxiliary ship designs. During the 1930s, the Imperial Japanese Navy made increasing use of naval aviation as scouts for its cruiser and destroyer squadrons. Due to restrictions imposed by the Washington Naval Treaty and London Naval Treaty, the number of aircraft carriers was strictly regulated; however, there was no limitation as to seaplane tenders.

== Design ==
Chiyoda was designed from the start on the premise that the design from the waterline upwards could be modified to suit a variety of missions. The hull and engine design was based on a high speed oiler, with a maximum speed of 20 knots (37 km/h; 23 mph), but the ship was completed as a seaplane tender, with four aircraft catapults for launching seaplanes, and cranes for recovering landed aircraft on her aft deck. As designed, Chiyoda carried a complement of Kawanishi E7K Type 94 "Alf" and Nakajima E8N Type 95 "Dave" floatplanes. Her armament consisted of four 12.7 cm/40 Type 89 naval guns and twelve Type 96 25 mm AA guns.

Propulsion was of four boilers, which operated two geared steam turbines providing 56,800 horsepower (42,400 kW) and two propellers. With two additional diesel engines operating Chiyoda could attain 28.5 knots (52.8 km/h; 32.8 mph).

With the loss of four large aircraft carriers at the Battle of Midway, the Imperial Japanese Navy rushed a project to convert the Chitose-class into light aircraft carriers as partial compensation. A wooden 180 by 23 metres (591 ft × 75 ft) flight deck was installed, with two elevators. The bridge was moved to the front end of the new hangar deck, and the boiler exhaust gases were discharged through pipes to the starboard side below the flight deck, and the diesel engines had smaller, separate smokestacks also on the starboard side. As converted, the ship could carry 30 aircraft.

== Operational history ==
=== As a seaplane tender ===
Chiyoda was laid down on 14 December 1936 and launched on 19 November 1937 at Kure Naval Arsenal and was commissioned on 15 December 1938. On completion, she was assigned directly to the Combined Fleet under the command of Captain Tomeo Kaku and was dispatched to the front lines in the Second Sino-Japanese War paired with the seaplane tender Kamoi. She remained engaged in combat operations in China until May 1940. On returning to Kure Naval Arsenal on 23 May 1940, Chiyoda underwent her first major modification, with her aircraft capacity reduced from 24 to 12 aircraft, and the space used to store 12 Type A Kō-hyōteki-class submarines. This rebuild was completed on 23 June, and Chiyoda was assigned to the 4th Fleet based at Truk in September. Captain Kaku Harada was appointed captain in August. Chiyoda returned to participate in a naval review held on 11 October in Yokohama to celebrate the 2600th anniversary of the founding of the Japanese Empire. Afterwards, she was reassigned back to the Combined Fleet and began training operations on the use of her midget submarines through September, developing tactics for attacking other vessels (using Chitose as a target) and penetrating enemy naval bases. At the time of the attack on Pearl Harbor, Chiyoda was docked at Kure and continued training operations to 20 March 1942, when she was assigned to Vice Admiral Teruhisa Komatsu’s 6th Fleet together with the submarine tender Nisshin and Aikoku Maru.

During the Battle of Midway, Chiyoda was part of Main Body of the Japanese fleet. For this operation, she carried eight Type A Kō-hyōteki-class submarines, which were intended to be stationed at Kure Atoll, which was to be seized as a seaplane base for operations against Midway Atoll. The operation was cancelled on the loss of the Japanese aircraft carriers during the Battle of Midway, and Chiyoda returned to Hashirajima with her submarines on 14 June without having seen combat.

During June, Chiyoda was refit for operations in northern waters, and departed Yokosuka Naval District on 28 June, arriving at Japanese-occupied Kiska in the Aleutian Islands on 5 July with a construction team to build a seaplane base. She was attacked by aircraft from the United States Army Air Force's 11th Air Force on the same day, without damage and arrived back at Hashirajima on 19 July.

On 25 September, Chiyoda was reassigned to the Guadalcanal area in the Solomon Islands and delivered eight Type A Kō-hyōteki-class submarines to Shortland Island on 14 October. She was attacked by Allied aircraft on 29 October and 31 October, but suffered no damage, and on 6 November, after her return to Truk, she was attacked by the submarine USS Grayling, which fired three torpedoes at Chiyoda, all of which missed. Chiyoda returned to Yokosuka on 8 January 1943 and was converted from a seaplane tender to a light aircraft carrier at the Yokosuka Naval Arsenal beginning 16 January, with the work completed on 21 December 1943.

=== Conversion ===
After conversion, Chiyoda was assigned to the 3rd Fleet and departed Yokosuka for Saipan, Guam and Palau, Balikpapan and Davao on 1 March as part of emergency reinforcements following the fall of Kwajalein to the US, returning to Kure on 10 April. On 11 May, she departed for Tawitawi with Air Group 653 as part of Operation A-Go, for the defense of the Mariana Islands. She was accompanied by the carriers Chitose, Zuihō, Jun'yō, Hiyō, Ryūhō and by the battleship Musashi. During the Battle of the Philippine Sea on 19 June, she was part of the Van Force with carriers Chitose, Zuihō, battleships Yamato, Musashi, Kongō, Haruna and cruisers Atago, Takao, Maya and Chōkai. She was hit by a bomb on 20 June on her aft flight deck, which killed 20 crewmen, wounded 30 more and destroyed two aircraft. She was withdrawn for repairs on 22 June. She remained at Kure through the end of July.

=== Final battle ===
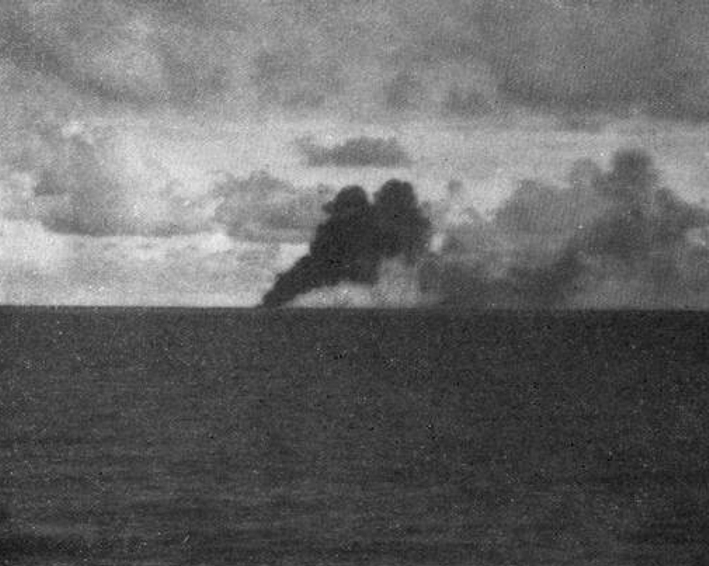
Chiyoda burning, under fire from U.S. cruisers, 25 October 1944.

On 20 October 1944 Chiyoda departed Oita as part of Admiral Jisaburō Ozawa’s Decoy Force intended to lure the American fleet away from the landing beaches in the Philippines in the Battle of Leyte Gulf. This force included Zuikaku, Zuihō, Chitose and Chiyoda, and the hybrid battleship-carriers Hyūga and Ise, though the six carriers were divested of all but 108 aircraft, accompanied by cruisers Oyodo, Tama, Isuzu. Ozawa's ostensible carrier group was facing a force that included ten United States Navy carriers containing 600–1,000 aircraft. On 25 October, both Chiyoda and Chitose were sunk by a combination of naval bombers, cruiser shellfire and destroyer-launched torpedoes during the Battle off Cape Engaño.

Chiyoda was crippled by four bombs dropped by aircraft from the carriers USS Franklin and USS Lexington that left her dead in the water. The converted hybrid battleship-carrier Hyūga attempted to take her in tow, but was prevented by a third attack. The cruiser Isuzu was ordered to remove Chiyoda's crew, but this was also frustrated due to continuing danger from air and surface attack. After three attempts, Isuzu was forced to retreat with U.S. surface forces in sight and Chiyoda under naval gunfire. She was finished off by gunfire from four cruisers, USS Santa Fe, Mobile, Wichita and New Orleans, along with nine destroyers, all under the command of Rear Admiral Laurance DuBose. No survivors were permitted to be rescued, and Captain Jō Eiichirō and the entire crew of 1,470 officers and men went down with the ship at position 19°20′N 126°20′E. Chiyoda was removed from the navy list on 20 December 1944.
