= Japanese destroyer Suzutsuki (1942) =

Akizuki-class destroyer

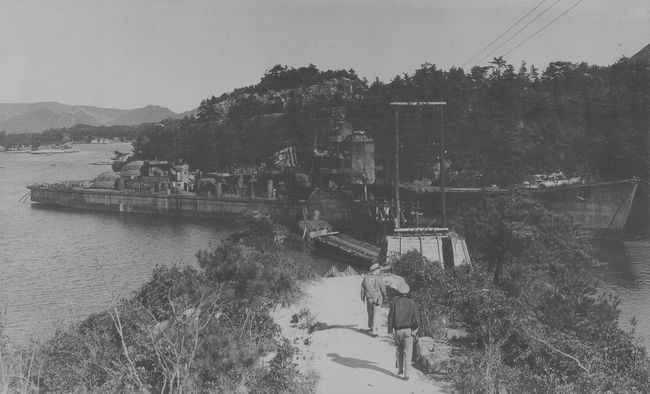
- Suzutsuki at Ainoura, Sasebo, postwar

History

Empire of Japan
- Name: Suzutsuki
- Namesake: Clear moon (in autumn)
- Builder: Mitsubishi Nagasaki Shipyard
- Laid down: 15 March 1941
- Launched: 4 March 1942
- Completed: 29 December 1942
- Commissioned: 29 December 1942
- In service: 1942–1945
- Stricken: 20 November 1945
- Fate: Used as breakwater in 1948

General characteristics
- Class & type: Akizuki-class destroyer
- Displacement: 2,700 long tons (2,743 t) standard; 3,700 long tons (3,759 t) full load
- Length: 134.2 m (440 ft 3 in)
- Beam: 11.6 m (38 ft 1 in)
- Draft: 4.15 m (13 ft 7 in)
- Propulsion: 3 × Ro-Gō Kampon water tube boilers, 2 × Kampon impulse geared turbines, 2 shafts, 52,000 shp (39,000 kW)
- Speed: 33 knots (61 km/h; 38 mph)
- Range: 8,300 nmi (15,400 km; 9,600 mi) at 18 kn (33 km/h; 21 mph)
- Complement: 263
- Armament: 15 January 1943 : 8 × 100 mm (4 in)/65 cal Type 98 DP guns; 12 × Type 96 25 mm (0.98 in) AA guns (4×3); 4 × 610 mm (24 in) torpedo tubes; 8 × Type 93 torpedoes; 56 × Type 95 depth charges; October 1944 : 8 × 100 mm (4 in)/65 cal DP guns; 41 × 25 mm AA guns (7×3 + 20×1); 4 × 610 mm (24 in) torpedo tubes; 8 × Type 93 torpedoes; 56 × Type 2 depth charges

Suzutsuki (涼月) was an Akizuki-class destroyer of the Imperial Japanese Navy. Her name means "Clear Moon (in Autumn)". Suzutsuki is best known for her participation in Operation Ten-Go as one of the battleship Yamato's eight escort ships, where her bow was blown off by an American torpedo. Suzutsuki survived the battle, and escaped American forces by reversing all the way back to port. She was used as a breakwater until 20 November 1945, when her name was struck from the naval register and she was sold for scrap soon after. Suzutsuki was the longest serving member of her class.

== Design and description ==
The Akizuki-class ships were originally designed as anti-aircraft escorts for carrier battle groups, but were modified with torpedo tubes and depth charges to meet the need for more general-purpose destroyers. The ships measured 134.2 meters (440 ft 3 in) overall, with beams of 11.6 meters (38 ft 1 in) and drafts of 4.15 meters (13 ft 7 in). They displaced 2,701 long tons (2,744 t) at standard load and 3,420 long tons (3,470 t) at deep load. Their crews numbered 300 officers and enlisted men.

Each ship had two Kampon geared steam turbines, each driving one propeller shaft using steam provided by three Kampon water-tube boilers. The turbines were rated at a total of 52,000 shaft horsepower (38,776 kW) for a designed speed of 33 knots (61 km/h; 38 mph). The ships carried enough fuel oil to give them ranges of 8,300 nautical miles (15,400 km; 9,600 mi) at speeds of 18 knots (33 km/h; 21 mph).

The main armament of the Akizuki class consisted of eight 100-millimeter (3.9 in) Type 98 dual-purpose guns in four twin-gun turrets, two superfiring pairs fore and aft of the superstructure. They each carried a dozen 25-millimeter (1 in) Type 96 anti-aircraft (AA) guns in four triple-gun mounts. The ships were also each armed with four 610-millimeter (24 in) torpedo tubes in a single quadruple rotating mount amidships; one reload was carried for each tube. The first batch of ships were each equipped with two depth charge throwers for which 54 depth charges were carried. Suzutsuki was equipped with a Type 21 early-warning radar on her foremast.

== Construction and career ==
On 6–7 April 1945, Suzutsuki escorted the battleship Yamato from the Inland Sea on her attack mission against the Allied forces fighting on Okinawa. Her bow was torn off by a torpedo from aircraft of Task Force 58, but survived and returned to Sasebo, by steaming in reverse the whole way. She, her sister ships Fuyutsuki, Yukikaze, and Hatsushimo (sunk in late July by a mine off the Inland Sea), survived the ordeal, despite suffering heavy damage, but Yamato and five escorts – Yahagi, Asashimo, Kasumi, Hamakaze and Isokaze – were all sunk with heavy losses of life. Some of the survivors were picked up by Suzutsuki.

Following the end of the war, Suzutsuki's name was delisted from the Navy List on 20 November, and she was to then be used as a breakwater at Wakamatsu-ku.

== Ship History ==
=== Construction Details ===
On November 1, 1940, the Yamato-class battleship Musashi was launched at Mitsubishi Heavy Industries Nagasaki Shipyard. The Imperial Japanese Navy decided to build the Akizuki-class destroyers side by side on the slipway after the launch of Musashi. Initially, it was planned to build four Akizuki-class destroyers at the same time, but in reality, two ships would be built side by side.

On March 15, 1941, No. 106 ship Suzutsuki was laid down at Mitsubishi Heavy Industries Nagasaki Shipyard. On November 21 of that year, Teruzuki was launched.

On January 20, 1942, the Akizuki-class destroyer under construction was given the name Suzutsuki, and the Yūgumo-class destroyer Takanami. On the same date, the two ships (Suzutsuki and Takanami) were classified into the ship classification chart. On March 4 of the same year, Suzutsuki was launched. Mitsubishi Nagasaki Shipyard in the Pacific War built a total of 5 ships of the Akizuki class: Teruzuki, Suzutsuki, Niizuki, Wakatsuki, and Shimotsuki.

On September 10, Lieutenant Colonel Tsuguto Akazawa, commander of the destroyer Shiranui, the second ship of the Kagerō class, was appointed Chief of Equipment on the Suzutsuki. On September 13, the Suzutsuki Outfitting Office began operations.

On December 29 of the same year, the ship was completed. Akazawa's rigging chief became the captain of Suzutsuki. The main first-generation executives were Lieutenant Masamoto Yoshizawa, Chief of Gunnery, Lieutenant Hiroshi Furukawa, Chief of Torpedoes, Reserve Lieutenant Masaharu Takahashi, Chief of Voyage, and Captain Masao Kimura, Chief of Engineering. The Suzutsuki Outfitters Office was removed. On the same day, the two ships Suzutsuki and Hatsuzuki were registered at Sasebo naval base. At Sasebo, three ships – Suzutsuki, Hatsuzuki, and the Yūgumo-class destroyer Ōnami – were designated as patrol destroyers.

=== 1943 ===
After completion, Suzutsuki was stationed at Yokosuka naval base. She along with her sister ship Hatsuzuki were then transferred to the 3rd Fleet (Commander-in-Chief Lieutenant General Jisaburō Ozawa, 37th Naval Academy) on 15 January, and the 10th Squadron belonging to the 61st Destroyer Division. The 61st Destroyer Division originally consisted of Akizuki, the lead ship of the Akizuki class, and Teruzuki, the second ship of that class. However, Teruzuki was torpedoed by a US torpedo boat and sank on 12 December 1942 while engaged in a transport operation to Guadalcanal. She was replaced in the 61st Destroyer Division with Suzutsuki and Hatsuzuki. The division now consisted of three Akizuki-class destroyers: Akizuki, Suzutsuki, and Hatsuzuki.

On January 15, Suzutsuki left Yokosuka for Kure. In the early hours of January 16, Suzutsuki and Hatsuzuki found the American submarine USS Haddock surfaced off Shionomisaki, but escaped. At the same time, on January 19, Akizuki in action in the Solomon Islands was wrecked in a torpedo attack by the submarine USS Nautilus. On February 19, the 61st Destroyer Division (Suzutsuki and Hatsuzuki) advanced to the waters near Japan, and met with the Japanese fleet returning from Truk atoll to Sasebo after operations around Guadalcanal. The fleet, commanded by Vice Admiral Takeo Kurita, was composed of the battlecruisers Kongō and Haruna, seaplane tender Nisshin, heavy cruiser Tone, and destroyer Shigure.

In preparation for Operation I-Go, an air offensive operation targeting the Solomon Islands and islands of New Guinea, on March 22, Suzutsuki along with three destroyers, the light aircraft carriers Jun'yō and Hiyō, and two heavy cruisers Tone and Chikuma arrived at Truk atoll on March 27–28. In carrying out this operation, it was necessary to transport not only the pilots but also maintenance personnel and other aviation personnel to Rabaul, New Britain. On April 2, Suzutsuki and Hatsuzuki sortied from Truk to transport air personnel to Rabaul. On April 3, the heavy cruiser Aoba was severely damaged in an air raid in Kavieng, New Ireland, along with the surrounding area. After arriving at Rabaul on April 4, Suzutsuki departed immediately and returned to Truk on 6 April. From mid-April to mid-May, she escorted ships entering and leaving Truk atoll.

On July 19, the 61st Destroyer Division (Suzutsuki and Hatsutsuki) joined the 8th Sentai (Tone and Chikuma), the 10th Sentai flagship Agano, two cruisers (Mogami, Oyodo), and the 4th Destroyer Division (Arashi, Hagikaze). sortied from Truk with the 17th Destroyer Division (Isokaze). After arriving in Rabaul, the 10th Squadron splits into two to transport supplies to the Buin and Buka Islands. On the night of July 21, the 10th Squadron departed from Rabaul. The 61st Destroyer Division (Suzutsuki, Hatsuzuki) carried the Nankai 4th Garrison and arrives at Buka Island on 22 July. The transport mission was successful (the Nankai 4th Garrison advanced to Bougainville Island)[108], and returned to Truk on the 26th.

After that, the 61st Destroyer Division (Suzutsuki, Hatsutsuki) was engaged in transport missions between Truk, Rabaul, and Kwajalein Atoll from late July to early September. On August 15, the 6th Akizuki-class destroyer, Wakatsuki, was incorporated into the 61st Destroyer Division, and the squadron became a three-class of Akizuki-class destroyers (Suzutsuki, Hatsuzuki, and Wakatsuki). In September and October, the 61st Destroyer Division sortied for the Marshall Islands. On October 31, Akizuki returned to the 61st Destroyer Division after repairs, and the division finally formed four Akizuki-class destroyers (Suzutsuki, Hatsutsuki, Wakatsuki, and Akizuki).

On November 10, as Suzutsuki was escorting a transport convoy en route to Truk from Rabaul, the transport ship Tokyo Maru was heavily damaged by lightning. As Suzutsuki was attempting to help with repairs, the light cruiser Agano, which was previously damaged by an air raid at Rabaul, was struck by a torpedo from the submarine USS Scamp (SS-277). After the Tokyo Maru sank, Suzutsuki went to help Agano with repairs. Suzutsuki, along with destroyers Hatsuzuki, Urakaze, Fujinami, Hayami, and the light cruisers Noshiro and Nagara escorted Agano back to Truk.

=== 1944 ===
During the first weeks of 1944, Suzutsuki would escort transports to Wake Island. On her second transport voyage, she would be struck by two torpedoes from USS Sturgeon (SS-187), killing 130 men, including Colonel Tomari. One torpedo struck the forward magazine, completely destroying the bow past the No.2 Type 98 100-millimeter (3.9 in) dual purpose gun. The second torpedo hit the stern past the No.4 Type 98 100-millimeter (3.9 in) dual-purpose gun. In addition, a lightning strike would damage the bridge. Suzutsuki would then be towed by Hatsuzuki to Sukumo Bay. Restoration work was carried out at the Kure Naval Arsenal from January 19 until August 3. During this restoration, she was given a straight bow and angular bridge, which are characteristic of her appearance. Colonel Tomari was replaced by Colonel Shigetaka Amano on March 20. On August 3, Suzutsuki's repairs were completed and she would return to the 61st Destroyer Division. Suzutsuki then conducted training operations in the Seto Inland Sea.

On October 16, Suzutsuki was escorting transports from Keelung, Taiwan, but would come under attack from USS Besugo (SS-321), hit by another torpedo, and would sail back to Kure for repairs. On November 23, Suzutsuki escorted the aircraft carrier Junyo in an emergency transport mission to Manila, then escorted her along with the battleship Haruna back to Japan on December 3. The fleet would be attacked by a US Submarine wolfpack (USS Redfish (SS-395), USS Seadevil (SS-400), and USS Plaice (SS-390)) on December 9, just before entering Sasebo, but Suzutsuki would not be damaged during the ambush. Suzutsuki, however, would be damaged by a passing storm and would be sent back to Kure for repairs until December 27. Afterwards, she conducted training operations in the Seto Inland Sea.

=== 1945 ===
At the beginning of 1945 or around the end of 1944, machine gun mounts were added on the left and right sides of the bridge, and two 25mm triple machine guns were added (7 in total). In addition, the No. 21 electric probe on the front mast was removed, and one No. 22 electric probe and one No. 13 electric probe were installed (there are two No. 13 electric probes in total). During an air raid on Kure Naval Port on March 19, Suzutsuki escorted the battleship Yamato in Hiroshima Bay. The 2nd Fleet suffered no major damage.

=== Operation Ten-Go ===
At 3:00 p.m. on April 6, the Maritime Special Attack Force (1st Strike Force) under the command of Vice Admiral Seiichi Ito, Commander of the 2nd Fleet, the 1st Air Squadron, Yamato, the 2nd Torpedo Squadron light cruiser Yahagi, 17th Destroyer Division Isokaze, Yukikaze, Hamakaze, 21st Destroyer Division Asashimo, Kasumi, Hatsushimo, 41st Destroyer Division Fuyutsuki, Suzutsuki sortied from Tokuyama. At 19:50 in the first patrol order, Suzutsuki took position on the right side of Yamato.

After switching to the third cautious navigation order at 6:00 on the following day, April 7, she was positioned to the port rear of Yamato. In the morning of the same day, the Yugumo-class destroyer Asashimo dropped out due to an engine failure. She was attacked and sunk by American aircraft around 12:30.

At 12:32, the first wave of carrier-based aircraft from the US Task Force 58 (TF 58) arrived. While the wheel formation collapsed due to repeated rudder changes, Suzutsuki continued to cover Yamato’s port rear. In the first wave attack, Yahagi was struck by lightning and was unable to navigate, and Hamakaze sank

At 13:08, when the first wave of air raids was coming to an end (the electric clock on Suzutsuki’s bridge stopped. The actual time of the bombardment is unknown), a 150 kg bomb dropped from a SB2C Helldiver from USS Essex (CV-9), hit the front of the bridge, creating a large hole in the forecastle deck, upper deck, and bleeding off the starboard side. Turrets #1 and #2 were also severely damaged, and all but the ammunition magazines in turret #1 were flooded. Power was lost, and turret #2 exploded from an unextinguished fire. Fuyutsuki records at 13:15 that “Suzutsuki is on fire.” At this point, the first tank room was abandoned, but the engine department personnel were not damaged, and the second tank room was able to reach 20 knots. Due to the destruction of her steering gear and failure of the speed indicator, Suzutsuki was stuck turning to starboard, but at this time, Yamato turned to port, bringing the two ships closer to about 50m, but did not collide. From Suzutsuki, it was seen that Yamato had a rudder failure flag flow signal (D flag).

At around 1:30 p.m., the second wave of attack by TF 58 carrier-based planes began. According to the report of the American attack squadron, the 2nd Fleet at that time consisted of the Yamato Guard Group (Yamato, Fuyutsuki, Hatsushimo, Yukikaze, Kasumi), the non-navigable Yahagi and the rescue of the same ship. Isokaze, with one light cruiser sailing between them. It is believed that Suzutsuki was misidentified as a light cruiser. This attack sank Yamato and Yahagi. Kasumi became unnavigable and the damaged Isokaze sailed north on her own.

After Canceling the Operation

Hirayama, the captain of Suzutsuki, who decided that Suzutsuki battle could not be continued, started returning to base at around 14:30 after Yamato sank. Due to the 150 kg bomb hit on Suzutsuki’s bow, completely destroying it, she was forced to reverse back to port at 20 knots. At this time, a TBF Avenger from the aircraft carrier USS Intrepid (CV-11) launched a torpedo, but it missed. Suzutsuki headed for the mainland of Japan, even though her nautical chart was burned and the gyrocompass was damaged. Hatsushimo sailed behind Suzutsuki and instructed her back to port. At 17:30, Suzutsuki encountered Isokaze, who was stopping offshore for emergency repairs. Isokaze would later be scuttled by Yukikaze. During Operation Ten-Go, Suzutsuki suffered 57 dead and 34 wounded.

=== Reserve Fleet ===
It was calculated that it would take about three months to repair Suzutsuki. A goal was set for completion on May 5, and carried out work that would not interfere with anchorage. Her hole was reinforced with beams in place, and her first and second turrets and machine guns removed. She departed Sasebo on 10 June, and she was moored at Ainoura with only her two rear turrets ready for firing on the gun side.

On 5 July, Suzutsuki was removed from the 41st Destroyer Division. On the same day she became the fourth reserve ship. At that time, the Suzutsuki crew consisted of about 100 people, and when she organized a farming team and a fishing team, she cleared the land (cultivating pumpkins and potatoes) and used the fishing boats she was given to procure food. During the intervening months of July and August, she engaged in anti-aircraft combat, including shooting down a P-51 Mustang with flak in August. On November 20, she was expelled from the Navy list.

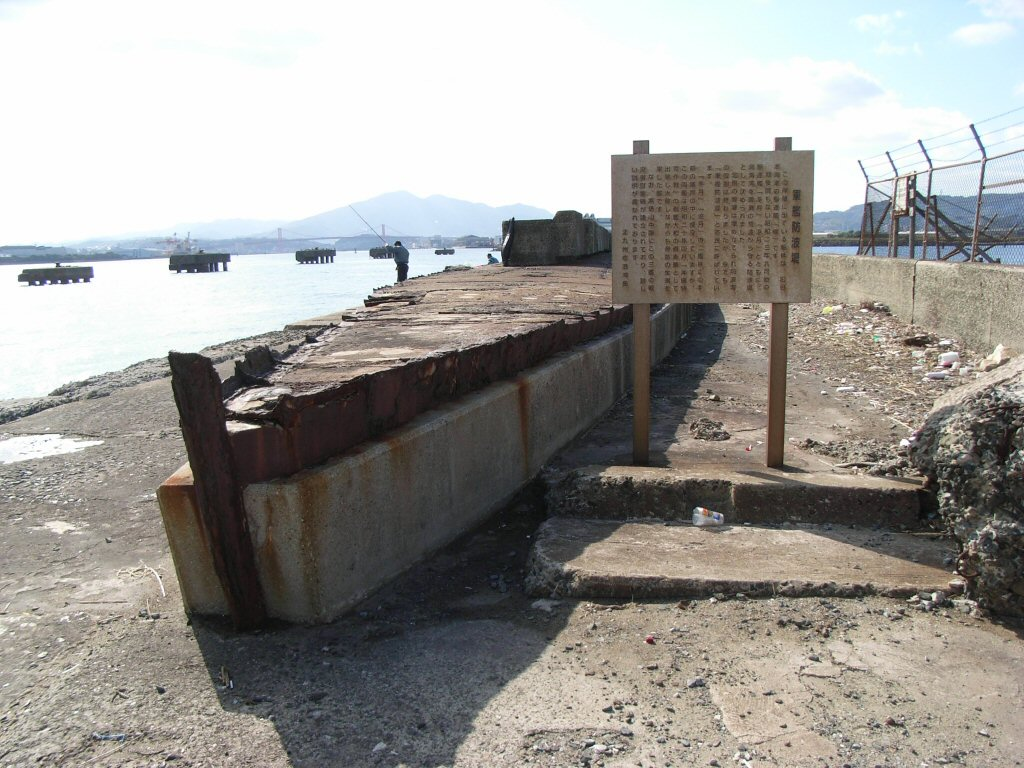
Yanagi's hull, with a sign describing the breakwater history, with Suzutsuki and Fuyutsuki buried in front of it.

After the war, Suzutsuki was not used as a demobilization transport due to her damage, and she was transferred to Sasebo where she was moored with Fuyutsuki. From April 1 to May 31, 1948, she carried out work to remove her superstructure at Sasebo Ship Industry, the former Sasebo Naval Arsenal. Her hull, along with the destroyers Fuyutsuki and Yanagi, was used as a breakwater at Wakamatsu Port. Locally, it was known as a warship breakwater, but was later completely buried. Today, a part of Yanagi's hull and information board can be seen near the exit of the Wakamatsu Canal in the Hibikinada Rinkai Industrial Park. On the other hand, it was possible to enter the Fuyutsuki and Suzutsuki hulls for a while, but now they are completely buried and cannot be confirmed.
