= Takanami =

Takanami may refer to:

- Japanese destroyer Takanami, the name of several Japanese destroyers
- Fumikazu Takanami (born 1975), a Japanese former professional baseball player
