= USS Mobile (CL-63) =

Light cruiser of the United States Navy

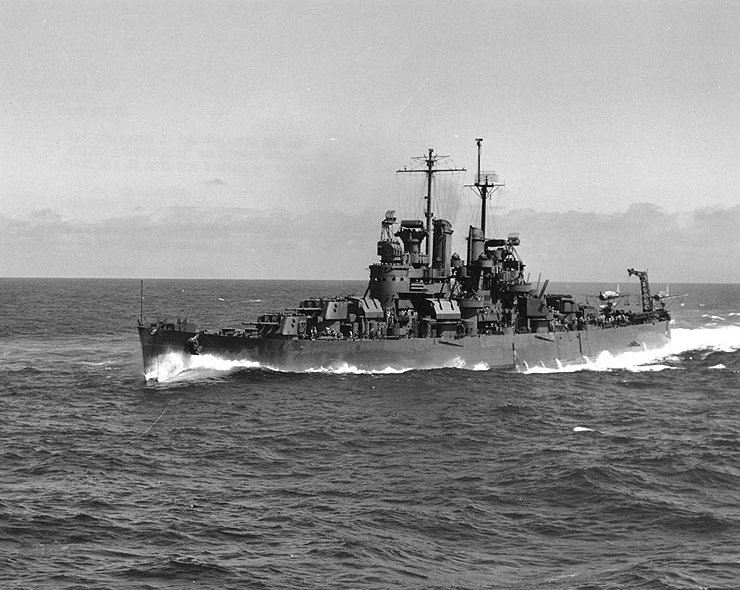
- USS Mobile (CL-63), Pacific Ocean, October 1943

History

United States
- Name: Mobile
- Namesake: City of Mobile, Alabama
- Builder: Newport News Shipbuilding and Dry Dock Company
- Laid down: 14 April 1941
- Launched: 15 May 1942
- Commissioned: 24 March 1943
- Decommissioned: 9 May 1947
- Stricken: 1 March 1959
- Fate: Sold for scrap on 16 December 1959

General characteristics
- Class & type: Cleveland-class light cruiser
- Displacement: 11,744 long tons (11,932 t) (standard); 14,131 long tons (14,358 t) (max)
- Length: 610 ft 1 in (185.95 m) oa; 608 ft (185 m)pp
- Beam: 66 ft 4 in (20.22 m)
- Draft: 25 ft 6 in (7.77 m) (mean); 25 ft (7.6 m) (max)
- Installed power: 4 × 634 psi Steam boilers; 100,000 shp (75,000 kW)
- Propulsion: 4 × geared turbines; 4 × screws
- Speed: 32.5 knots (60.2 km/h; 37.4 mph)
- Range: 11,000 nmi (20,000 km) at 15 kn (17 mph; 28 km/h)
- Complement: 1,255 officers and enlisted
- Armament: 4 × triple 6 in (150 mm)/47 caliber Mark 16 guns; 6 × dual 5 in (130 mm)/38 caliber anti-aircraft guns; 4 × quad 40 mm (1.6 in) Bofors anti-aircraft guns; 6 × dual 40 mm (1.6 in) Bofors anti-aircraft guns; 21 × single 20 mm (0.79 in) Oerlikon anti-aircraft cannons
- Armor: Belt: 3 1/2–5 in (89–127 mm); Deck: 2 in (51 mm); Barbettes: 6 in (150 mm); Turrets: 1 1/2–6 in (38–152 mm); Conning Tower: 2 1/4–5 in (57–127 mm)
- Aircraft carried: 4 × floatplanes
- Aviation facilities: 2 × stern catapults

USS Mobile (hull number: CL-63) was a Cleveland-class light cruiser of the United States Navy, which were built during World War II. The class was designed as a development of the earlier Brooklyn-class cruisers, the size of which had been limited by the First London Naval Treaty. The start of the war led to the dissolution of the treaty system, but the dramatic need for new vessels precluded a new design, so the Clevelands used the same hull as their predecessors, but were significantly heavier. The Clevelands carried a main battery of twelve 6-inch (152 mm) guns in four three-gun turrets, along with a secondary armament of twelve 5 in (127 mm) dual-purpose guns. They had a top speed of 32.5 knots (60.2 km/h; 37.4 mph).

== Design ==
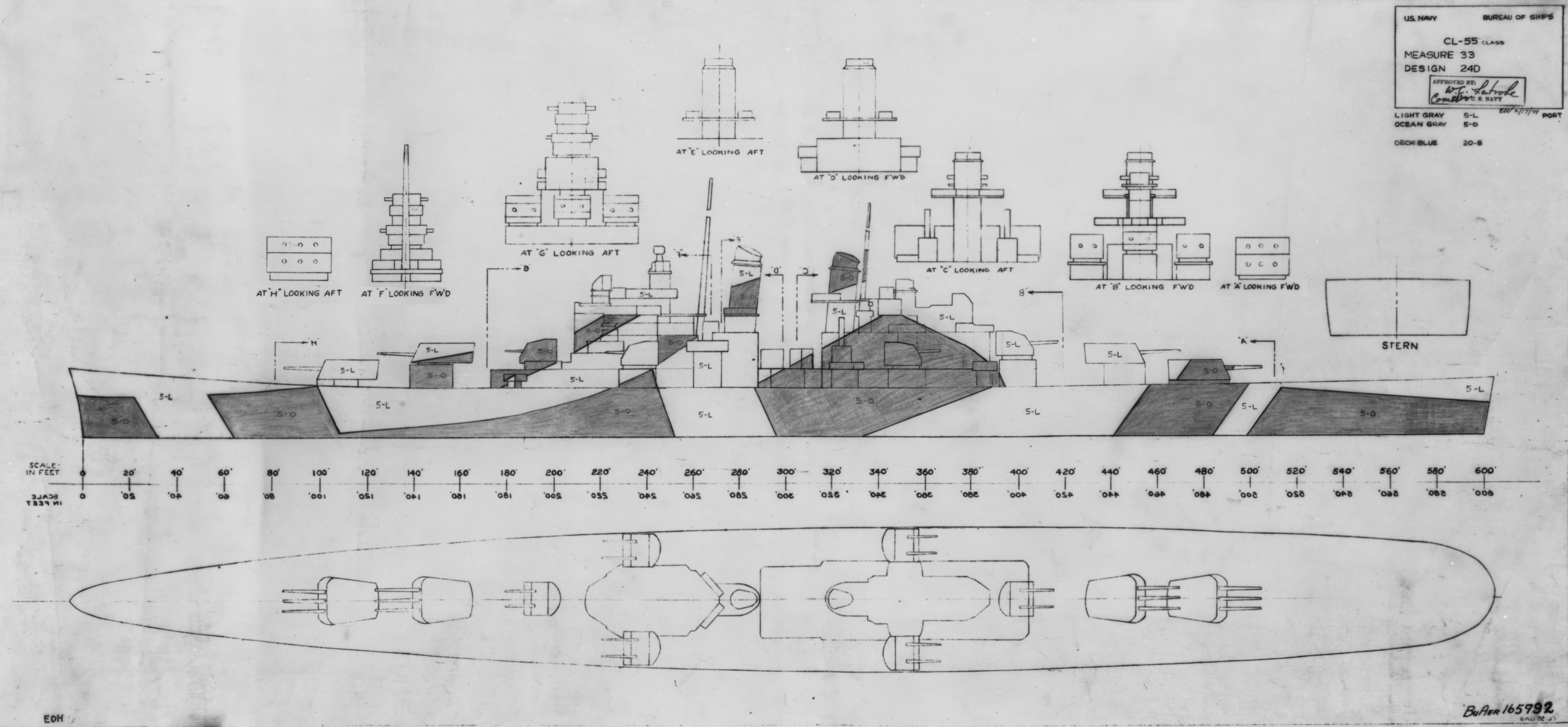
Depiction of the Cleveland class, showing the plan and profile

The Cleveland-class light cruisers traced their origin to design work done in the late 1930s; at the time, light cruiser displacement was limited to 8,000 long tons (8,100 t) by the Second London Naval Treaty. Following the start of World War II in September 1939, Britain announced it would suspend the treaty for the duration of the conflict, a decision the US Navy quickly followed. Though still neutral, the United States recognized that war was likely and the urgent need for additional ships ruled out an entirely new design, so the Clevelands were a close development of the earlier Brooklyn-class cruisers, the chief difference being the substitution of a two-gun 5 in (127 mm) dual-purpose gun mount for one of the main battery 6 in (152 mm) gun turrets.

Mobile was 610 feet 1 inch (186 m) long overall and had a beam of 66 ft 4 in (20.22 m) and a draft of 24 ft 6 in (7.47 m). Her standard displacement amounted to 11,744 long tons (11,932 t) and increased to 14,131 long tons (14,358 t) at full load. The ship was powered by four General Electric steam turbines, each driving one propeller shaft, using steam provided by four oil-fired Babcock & Wilcox boilers. Rated at 100,000 shaft horsepower (75,000 kW), the turbines were intended to give a top speed of 32.5 knots (60.2 km/h; 37.4 mph). Her crew numbered 1285 officers and enlisted men.

The ship was armed with a main battery of twelve 6 in /47-caliber Mark 16 guns (Note: /47 refers to the length of the gun in terms of calibers. A /47 gun is 47 times long as it is in bore diameter.) in four 3-gun turrets on the centerline. Two were placed forward in a superfiring pair; the other two turrets were placed aft of the superstructure in another superfiring pair. The secondary battery consisted of twelve 5 in (127 mm) /38-caliber dual-purpose guns mounted in twin turrets. Two of these were placed on the centerline, one directly behind the forward main turrets and the other just forward of the aft turrets. Two more were placed abreast of the conning tower and the other pair on either side of the aft superstructure. Anti-aircraft defense consisted of twenty-eight Bofors 40 mm (1.6 in) guns in four quadruple and six double mounts and twenty-one Oerlikon 20 mm (0.79 in) guns in single mounts.

The ship's belt armor ranged in thickness from 3.5 to 5 in (89 to 127 mm), with the thicker section amidships where it protected the ammunition magazines and propulsion machinery spaces. Her deck armor was 2 in (51 mm) thick. The main battery turrets were protected with 6.5 in (170 mm) faces and 3 in (76 mm) sides and tops, and they were supported by barbettes 6 inches thick. Mobile's conning tower had 5-inch sides.

== Service history ==
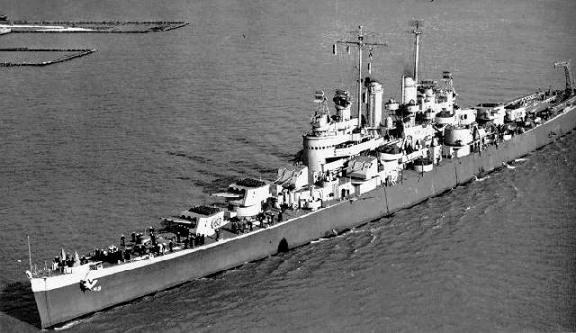
Mobile in April 1943, shortly after entering service

The keel for Mobile was laid down at the Newport News Shipbuilding and Dry Dock Company on 14 April 1941. She was launched on 15 May 1942, and was commissioned in March 1943. The ship conducted an initial shakedown cruise in Chesapeake Bay and then went on a short training cruise to Casco Bay, Maine. Mobile then departed the East Coast of the United States for the Pacific to join the forces waging the war against Japan. She arrived in Pearl Harbor on 23 July, where she took part in a month of training to prepare for combat operations.

=== Gilbert and Marshall Islands campaign ===
Mobile got underway on 22 August to rendezvous with Task Force 15 the following day. The unit was on the way to raid Marcus Island, which was carried out on 31 August. The ships raided two other Japanese-held islands the following month before joining the rest of the 5th Fleet for the Gilbert and Marshall Islands campaign. This was the first major operation in the island-hopping campaign the US Navy would wage across the Central Pacific, and the fleet's carrier force was primarily occupied with isolating targeted islands, neutralizing Japanese forces on surrounding islands, and supporting ground forces as they made their amphibious assaults. Mobile served as part of the defensive screen for the task force's aircraft carriers while they conducted preparatory raids on Tarawa on 18 September. She was transferred to Task Group 53.3 by 21 October, which sailed west to support landings on Bougainville Island in the Solomon Islands. From there, she sailed for Espiritu Santo, where she was transferred to TG 53.7 for the Battle of Tarawa. Mobile provided gunfire support to the marines fighting on Tarawa and Betio from 20 to 28 November.

Mobile transferred to TF 50 on 1 December, which was the progenitor of the fast carrier task force. Mobile escorted the carriers as they steamed north to launch air strikes on the Marshall Islands, targeting Japanese installations on Kwajalein Atoll and Wotje Atoll. The ships of TF 50 then sailed for Pearl Harbor for replenishment. Mobile was detached to sail on to San Diego, California, where on 29 December she joined the Amphibious Forces, 5th Fleet, serving in Cruiser Division 13 in TG 53.5, part of the escort group for the amphibious assault ships. The ships sortied two weeks later, bound for the Marshalls. Mobile and the rest of her division were detached on 29 January 1944 to bombard Wotje, while the rest of the fleet moved into position to invade Kwajalein. Mobile remained in the area through 6 February, bombarding Japanese forces on the island and assisting in the anti-aircraft defense of the carriers off the islands of Roi and Namur. She thereafter sailed for the fleet's advance base at Majuro, arriving on 12 February to join TF 58 (which is what TF 50 had been re-designated).

=== New Guinea campaign ===
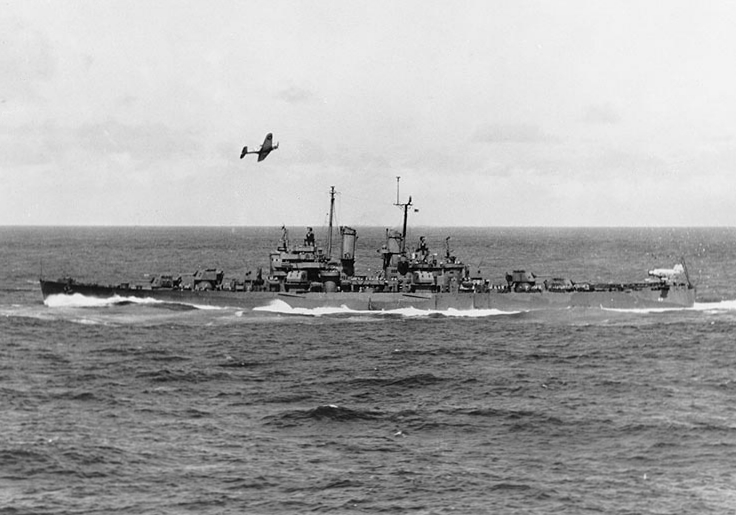
Mobile underway with an SBD Dauntless overhead

The ships of the fast carrier task force, including Mobile in TG 58.1, sortied from Majuro soon after arriving to make a major attack on the island of Truk in the Caroline Islands, to the west of the Marshalls. The raid, code-named Operation Hailstone, was intended to disrupt a major Japanese base in the region to reduce its ability to interfere both with the coming Battle of Eniwetok (the last phase of the Marshalls campaign) and Allied operations in New Guinea, to the south. The carriers struck the island on 16 and 17 February, including severe damage on the facilities in Truk. The American fleet then continued on to raid the Mariana Islands, hitting targets on Saipan, Tinian, and Guam on 21 and 22 February. The fleet returned to Majuro. After replenishing stores and ammunition, the ships of TG 58.1 sailed south for Espiritu Santo. They were re-designated as TG 36.1 on 12 March for direct support of operations in the New Guinea campaign. The ships sortied on 15 March to cover a marine landing on Emirau on 20 March.

In the course of Mobile's first year in service, she had taken part in eleven operations and cruised for more than 70,000 nmi (130,000 km; 81,000 mi). On 27 March, TG 36.1 resumed its previous designation as TG 58.1. The ships got underway again shortly thereafter to raid the Palau Islands, targeting Japanese positions on Yap and Woleai between 29 March and 3 April before returning to Majuro to replenish on 5 April. The group got underway again to rejoin the fighting in western New Guinea, supporting landings at Aitape, Humboldt Bay, and Tanahmerah Bay in the Battle of Hollandia. The ships then attacked Wakde Airfield and Sawar Airfield on 21 and 22 April, before turning back north to raid Truk again. The ships bombarded Satawan on 29 and 30 April and Pohnpei on 1 May, and then departed for Majuro to make preparations for the next major campaign in the central Pacific.

=== Mariana and Palau Islands campaign ===
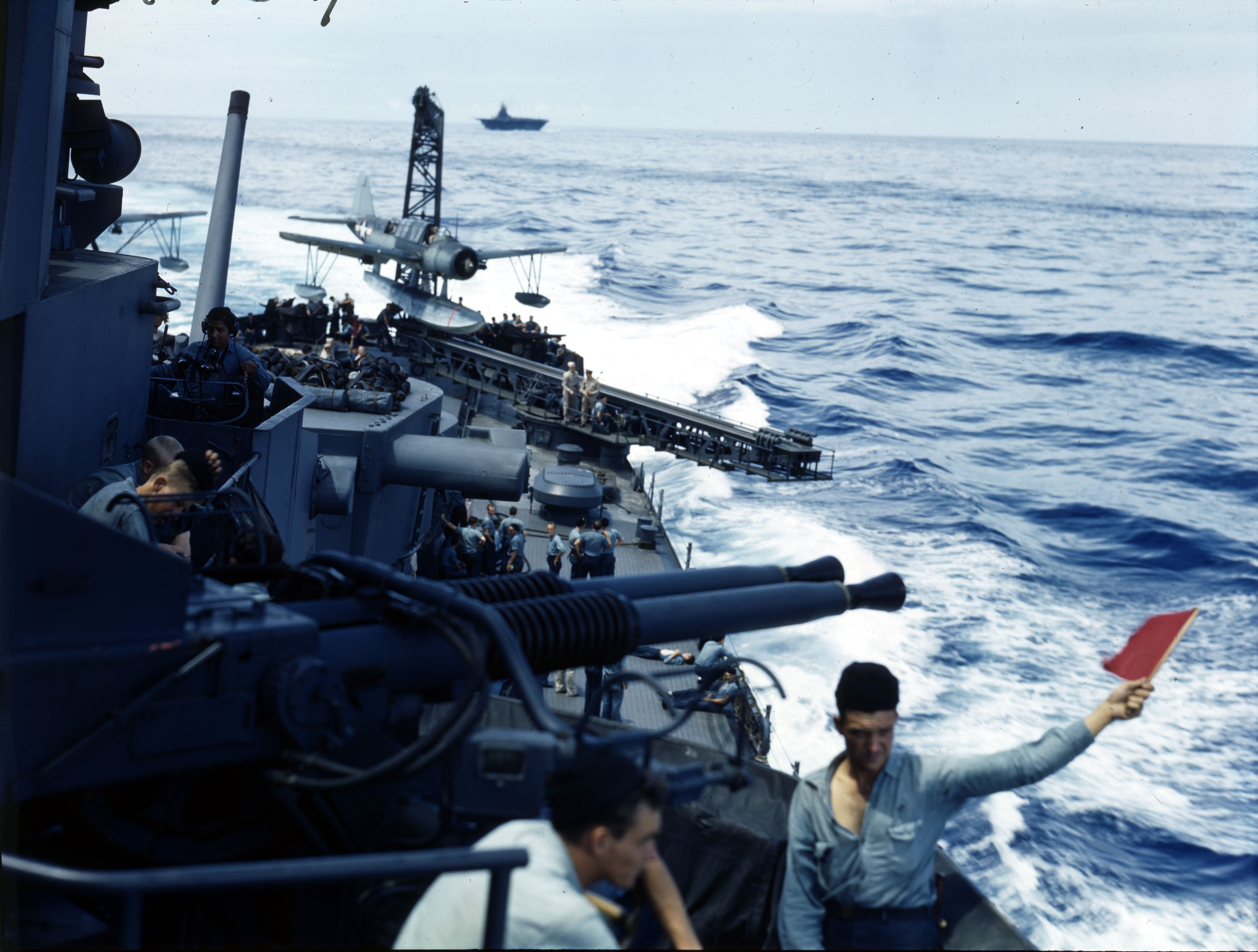
Mobile preparing to launch one of her reconnaissance floatplanes

The fast carrier task force, with Mobile still in the anti-aircraft screen, got underway again on 6 June to begin operations in the Marianas. They reached the island chain on 11 June and began air strikes on Japanese defenses on Saipan, Tinian, Guam, and Rota over the following several days. During this period, the ships also steamed north to raid the Bonin Islands to interdict Japanese reinforcements being sent to the Marianas. On 18 June, reports of an approaching Japanese fleet prompted the fast carrier task force to sail west and begin searches for its opponent. In the Battle of the Philippine Sea, which began on 19 June, the Japanese struck first, but failed to inflict significant damage. Mobile contributed her anti-aircraft fire to the fleet's defense, and her OS2U Kingfisher search planes were used to search for Japanese submarines and to pick up downed pilots. The American carrier aircraft inflicted heavy losses on their Japanese counterparts and sank the carrier Hiyō (the carriers Shōkaku and Taihō had been sunk by American submarines the previous day).

On 23 June, the fast carrier task force sailed back east to raid Pagan in the Marianas the following day. The ships then withdrew to Eniwetok for replenishment, which lasted until the end of the month, when they sortied again for another round of strikes on the Bonin Islands. These were carried out on 4 July, after which the fleet returned to the Marianas to resume operations in support of the ground forces fighting on the islands. These operations continued until 23 June, when TG 58.1, including Mobile, was detached for a raid on the western Caroline Islands, including the atolls at Yap, Ulithi, and Fais. Other carrier groups attacked the Palau Islands at the same time; the strikes continued until 30 August, when the task groups turned back to concentrate off Saipan. Task Force 58 reconstituted itself there on 2 August.

After re-forming, the ships of TF 58 steamed north for another series of attacks on the Bonins, raiding Iwo Jima, Chichijima, and Hahajima on 4 August. Mobile and the rest of Cruiser Division 13, along with Destroyer Division 46, were detached to make a sweep off Chichijima to search for Japanese shipping. The ships encountered a destroyer and a cargo ship, and Mobile contributed to both of their sinkings. The ships bombarded Chichijima the following day and then departed to return to Eniwetok. There, the fast carrier task force passed from 5th Fleet to 3rd Fleet, becoming Task Force 38. Mobile's group was accordingly re-numbered as TG 38.3. The task force sortied again to attack the Palau Islands again, the strikes lasting from 6 to 8 September. They then steamed further west to attack Mindanao in the southern Philippines on 9 and 10 September, and the Visayas in the central Philippines on 12 and 13 September. Afterward, the ships returned to Palau to support the amphibious assaults on Peleliu and Angaur and the first few days of the Battle of Peleliu. TG 38.3 then sailed back west to attack Japanese positions in the Philippines, including targets in the Manila area and the Visayas again, between 21 and 24 September.

=== Philippine campaign ===
After another period of replenishment, this time at the recently conquered Ulithi, the ships of TF 38 got underway on 6 October for the next major operation: the liberation of the Philippines. Mobile escorted the carriers for the first operation in the campaign, a series of air raids on the Ryukyu Islands and Formosa intended to neutralize Japanese air forces that could intervene in the upcoming landings. During the attacks on the Ryukyus, Mobile and the destroyers Gatling and Cotten were detached to sink a pair of Japanese vessels that had been detected some 30 nautical miles (56 km; 35 mi) from the fleet. They only found and sank one of the vessels, a large cargo ship, the other having already been sunk by American carrier aircraft. The ships rejoined the task force as it proceeded southwest to wage attacks on Formosa and the Pescadores.

During the ensuing Formosa Air Battle on 13 October, Mobile's sister ship Houston and the heavy cruiser Canberra were both torpedoed and badly damaged by Japanese aircraft. Mobile and several other vessels were detached from TF 38 to cover the withdrawal of what was nicknamed "Cripple Division 1". The American forces hoped that further Japanese forces would be lured out to be destroyed, but the Americans were detected by Japanese scout aircraft and the bait was not taken. Once the damaged vessels had withdrawn far enough to be out of range of Japanese aircraft, Mobile left the formation and returned to TG 38.3, arriving with her unit on 17 October.

Mobile and the rest of the fast carrier task force then turned south to begin attacks on the Philippines themselves as the invasion approached. They struck targets in the northern Philippines on 20 October and move south over the following days, attacking installations in southern Luzon and the Visayas to degrade Japanese forces in the area. In response, the Japanese launched a multi-pronged counterattack that resulted in the Battle of Leyte Gulf. On 24 October, TG 38.3 came under attack from aircraft from the Northern Force, commanded by Vice Admiral Jisaburō Ozawa, in the Battle off Cape Engaño, one of the constituent actions of the Leyte Gulf battle. The fast carrier task force steamed north to attack Ozawa's carriers and inflicted serious damage. Mobile and several other surface ships were sent to make a sweep for crippled Japanese vessels, and she assisted in the sinking of the light carrier Chiyoda and the destroyer Hatsuzuki. They then rejoined the task force to return south.

For the next two months, the fast carrier task force operated in the Philippines, covering the next several amphibious invasions of islands in the Visayas and on Mindoro. Mobile continued in her role as a carrier escort during this period, until she was detached to sail home for repairs and maintenance. She stopped in Ulithi on the way, departing there on 26 December and arriving at Terminal Island, California, sixteen days later.

=== End of the war ===
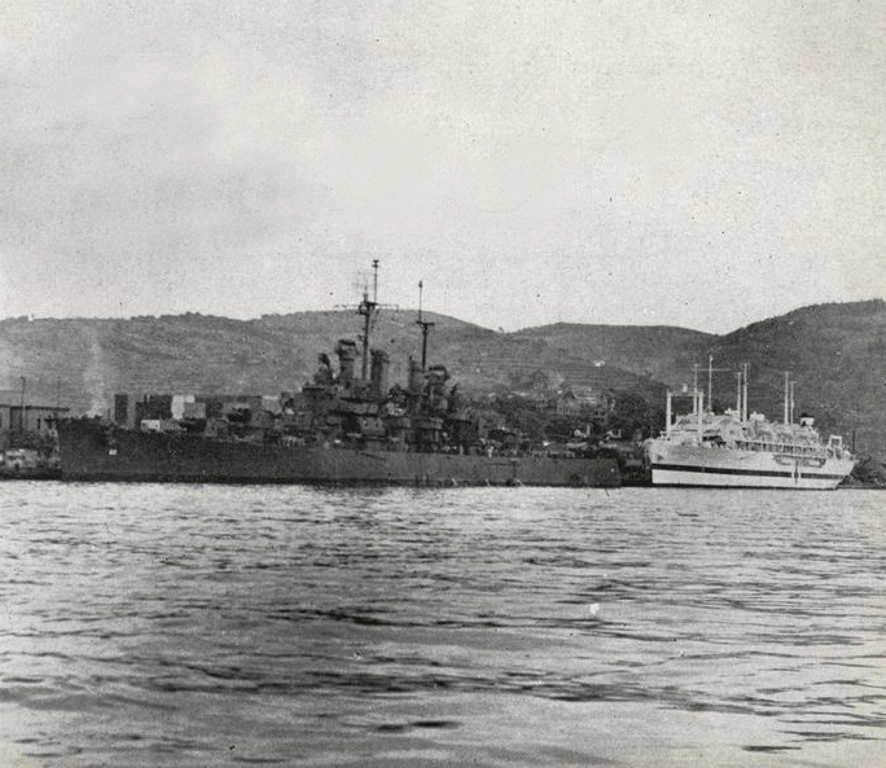
Mobile in Japan after the war; the hospital ship USS Haven is astern

Mobile arrived back in Ulithi on 29 March 1945, but she soon departed to join the invasion fleet off Okinawa. She arrived there on 3 April and was assigned to Task Force 51, Amphibious Forces, Pacific Fleet; the Battle of Okinawa had begun two days before her arrival. The ship operated off the island for the next two months, bombarding Japanese positions on the island, providing anti-aircraft defense to the invasion fleet, and participating in anti-submarine patrols. She was also periodically assigned to groups patrolling for Japanese Shinyo suicide boats. In late May, Mobile was detached to return to the Philippines to join Task Group 95.7, the Philippine Training Group, where she remained for the rest of the war. Mobile was awarded eleven battle stars during her wartime career.

=== Post-War ===
With the war over, Mobile left San Pedro Bay in the Philippines on 20 August, bound for Okinawa to join the forces available for occupation duty. She made several cruises between Okinawa and the Japanese Home Islands in September, carrying prisoners of war who had been liberated after the surrender of Japan. In October, she operated off Sasebo, and on 18 November, she departed Japanese waters with a contingent of sailors and marines aboard, bound for San Diego, California, the first of two Operation Magic Carpet voyages she would make. She arrived there on 2 December and then made her second trip, after which she went to Puget Sound to be laid up. She was decommissioned on 9 May 1947 and allocated to the reserve fleet based in Bremerton, Washington, where she remained until 1 March 1959. She was struck from the Naval Vessel Register that day and was sold to ship breakers on 16 December, and was eventually towed away to the breakers' yard on 19 January 1960.
