= Richard Jordan Gatling =

American inventor (1818–1903)

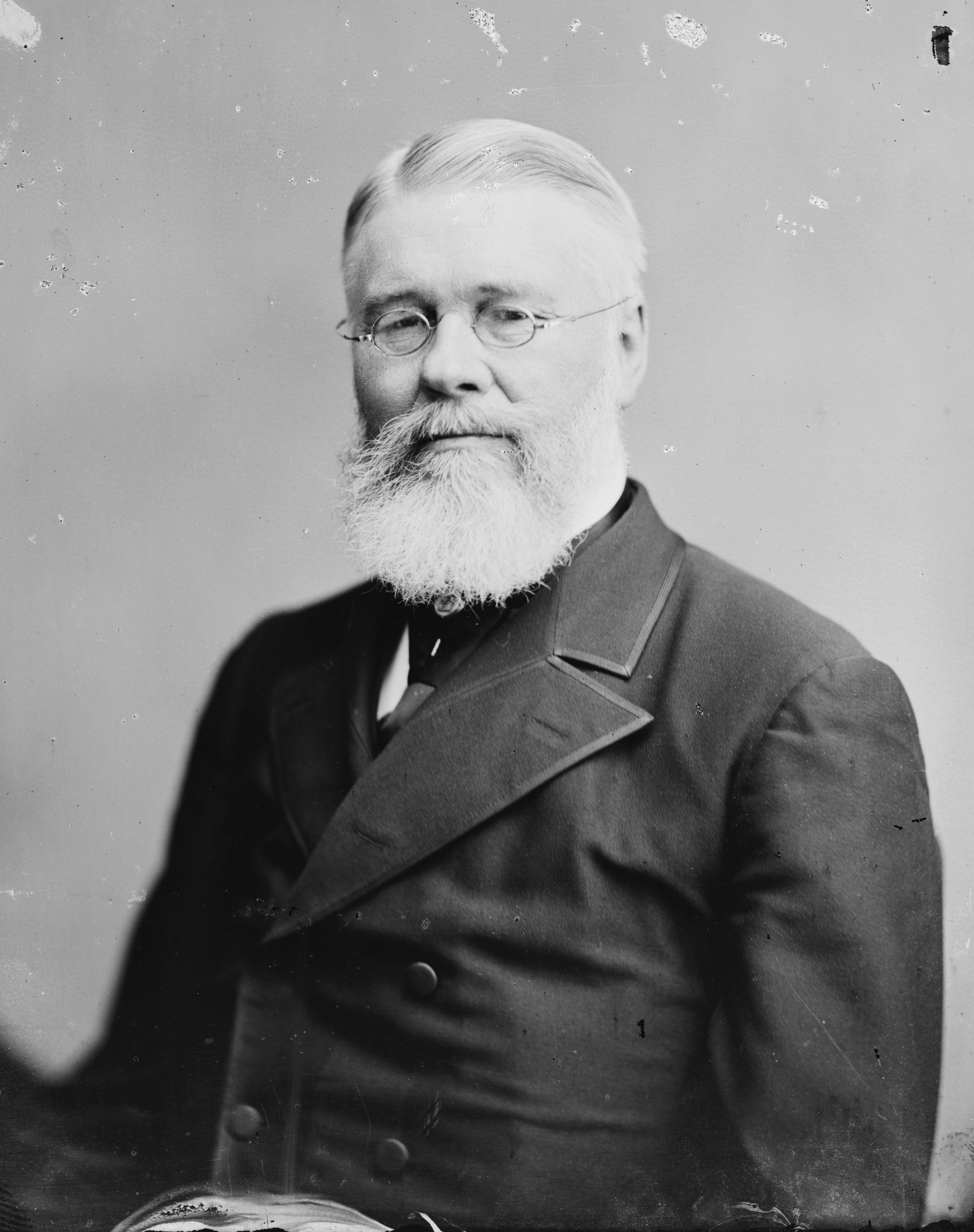
- Gatling sometime between 1870 and 1880
- Born: September 12, 1818; Hertford County, North Carolina, U.S.
- Died: February 26, 1903 (aged 84); New York City, New York, U.S.
- Resting place: Crown Hill Cemetery and Arboretum, Section 3, Lot 10; 39.817555°N 86.173018°W
- Known for: Gatling gun
- Spouse: Jemima Sanders (m. 1854)

Richard Jordan Gatling (September 12, 1818 – February 26, 1903) was an American inventor. He is best known for having invented the Gatling gun, which is considered to be the first successful machine gun.

== Life ==
Gatling was born in Hertford County, North Carolina in 1818 and raised Methodist. At the age of 21, Gatling created a screw propeller for steamboats, without realizing that one had been patented just months beforehand by John Ericsson. While living in North Carolina, he worked in the county clerk's office, taught school briefly, and became a merchant. At the age of 36, Gatling moved to St. Louis, Missouri, where he worked in a dry goods store and invented a rice-sowing machine and a wheat drill (a machine to aid planting wheat). The introduction of these machines did much to revolutionize the agricultural system in the country. After an attack of smallpox, Gatling became interested in medicine. He graduated from the Ohio Medical College in 1850 with an MD. Although he had his MD, he never practiced; he was more interested in a career as an inventor.

At the outbreak of the Civil War, Gatling was living in Indianapolis, Indiana. There he devoted himself to the perfection of firearms. In 1861, the same year the war started, he invented the Gatling gun. A year later, he founded the Gatling Gun Company.

By the early 1850s, Gatling was successful enough in business to offer marriage to Jemima Sanders, 19 years younger than Gatling and the daughter of a prominent Indianapolis physician. They married on October 25, 1854. Her older sister Zerelda was married to David Wallace, the governor of Indiana. An active member of his Masonic lodge, he was member of Center Lodge No. 23.

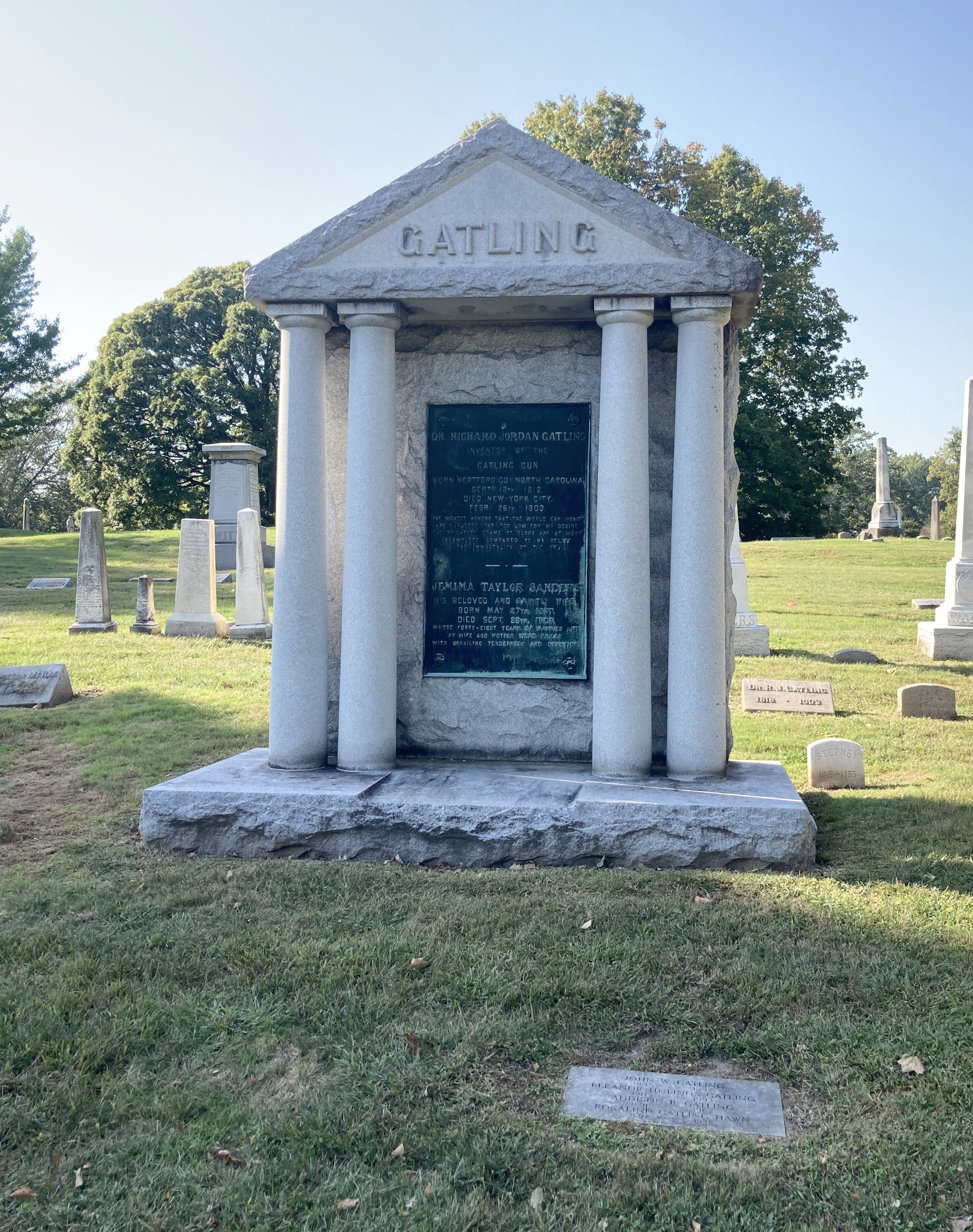
Gatling mausoleum at Crown Hill Cemetery

Later in his life, Gatling patented inventions to improve toilets, bicycles, steam-cleaning of raw wool, pneumatic power, and many other fields. He was elected as the first president of the American Association of Inventors and Manufacturers in 1891, serving for six years. Although still quite wealthy at the time of his death, he made and lost several fortunes by his investments.

In his final years, Gatling moved back to St. Louis, Missouri, to form a new company for manufacturing his steam plows, or tractors. While in New York City to visit his daughter and to talk with his patent agency, Gatling died at his daughter's home on February 26, 1903. He is interred at the Crown Hill Cemetery in Indianapolis.

His contributions were commemorated by the U.S. Navy during World War II when the Fletcher Class Destroyer DD-671 was christened the USS Gatling.

== Inventions ==
While being most known for inventing the Gatling gun, Gatling invented and patented a number of other inventions. His inventions include a screw propeller and a wheat drill (a planting device) in 1839, a hemp break machine in 1850, a steam plow (steam tractor) in 1857, the Gatling gun in 1861, a marine steam ram in 1862, and a motor-driven plow (tractor).

=== Gatling gun ===
Gatling invented the Gatling gun after he noticed that a majority of the soldiers fighting in the Civil War were lost to disease rather than gunshots. In 1877, he wrote, "It occurred to me that if I could invent a machine gun which could by its rapidity of fire, enable one man to do as much battle duty as a hundred, that it would, to a large extent supersede the necessity of large armies, and consequently, exposure to battle and disease would be greatly diminished."

The gun was based on Gatling's seed planter. A working prototype was developed in 1861. In 1862, he founded the Gatling Gun Company in Indianapolis, Indiana to market the gun. The first six production guns were destroyed during a fire in December 1862 at the factory. All six of them had been manufactured at Gatling's expense. Undaunted, Gatling arranged for another thirteen to be manufactured at the Cincinnati Type Factory. Although the gun was developed during the Civil War, it saw very little action. This is partly because Gatling was accused of being a copperhead because of his North Carolina roots, but this was never proven. Gatling was never affiliated with the Confederate States government or military, nor did he live in the South during the Civil War.

General Benjamin F. Butler bought 12 and Admiral David Dixon Porter bought one, it was not until 1866 that the US Government officially purchased Gatling guns. In 1870, he sold his patents for the Gatling gun to Colt. Gatling remained president of the Gatling Gun Company until it was fully absorbed by Colt in 1897. In 1893, Gatling patented a Gatling gun that replaced the hand cranked mechanism with an electric motor, a relatively new invention at the time, achieving a rate of fire of 300 rounds per minute. The hand-cranked Gatling gun was declared obsolete by the United States Army in 1911. Decades later, the mechanical concept was resurrected and wedded to electrically driven cranking in the M61 Vulcan. That cannon has given rise to numerous variations scaled up to as high as 37 mm and down to 5.56 mm calibers offering versions that are gas-operated as well.

== Bibliography ==
- "Richard Jordan Gatling". Encyclopedia of World Biography. Gale. 2005.
- Eastin, William (1901). A History of masonry in Indianapolis. Indianapolis: Bobbs-Merrill Co.
- English, William Eastin (1895). A History of Early Indianapolis Masonry and of Center Lodge. Indianapolis: Bowen-Merrill Company.
- United States patent 502185, Gatling, R. J., "Machine Gun", issued July 25, 1893
- Keller, Julia (2008). Mr Gatling's Terrible Marvel: The Gun That Changed Everything and the Misunderstood Genius Who Invented It. Viking. pp. 294. ISBN 978-0-670-01894-9.
- Smith, Anthony (2002). Machine Gun: The Story of the Men and the Weapon that Changed the Face of War. Piatkus. ISBN 978-0-7499-2352-5.
- Stephenson, Frank (2003). Hertford County. Arcadia Publishing. ISBN 978-0-7385-1556-4.
- Wahl, Paul; Toppel, Donald R. (1971). The Gatling Gun. Arco. ISBN 978-90-70039-49-3.
