= Japanese destroyer Hatsushimo =

Two Japanese destroyers have been named Hatsushimo:

- Japanese destroyer Hatsushimo (1905), a Kamikaze-class destroyer launched in 1905 and stricken in 1928
- Japanese destroyer Hatsushimo (1933), a Hatsuharu-class destroyer launched in 1933 and sunk in 1945
