= Japanese destroyer Wakatsuki =

Akizuki-class destroyer

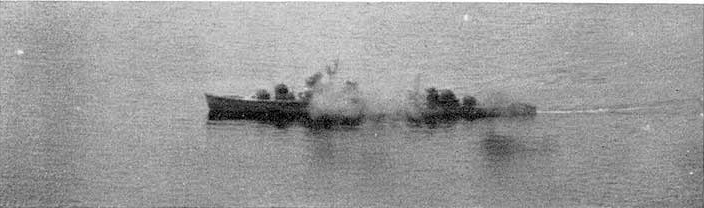
- Wakatsuki under attack at Ormoc Bay, Leyte Island, Philippines, 11 November 1944.

History

Empire of Japan
- Name: Wakatsuki
- Builder: Mitsubishi Nagasaki Shipyard
- Laid down: 9 March 1942
- Launched: 24 November 1942
- Completed: 31 May 1943
- Commissioned: 31 May 1943
- Stricken: 10 January 1945
- Fate: Sunk in action, 11 November 1944

General characteristics
- Class & type: Akizuki-class destroyer
- Displacement: 2,700 long tons (2,743 t) standard; 3,700 long tons (3,759 t) full load
- Length: 134.2 m (440 ft 3 in)
- Beam: 11.6 m (38 ft 1 in)
- Draft: 4.15 m (13 ft 7 in)
- Propulsion: 4 × Kampon type boilers; 2 × Parsons geared turbines; 2 × shafts, 50,000 shp (37 MW)
- Speed: 33 knots (38 mph; 61 km/h)
- Range: 8,300 nmi (15,400 km) at 18 kn (21 mph; 33 km/h)
- Complement: 263
- Armament: May 1943 : 8 × 100 mm (4 in)/65 cal Type 98 DP guns; 12 × Type 96 25 mm (0.98 in) AA guns (3×4); 4 × 610 mm (24 in) torpedo tubes; 8 × Type 93 torpedoes; 56 × Type 95 depth charges; November 1944 : 8 × 100 mm (4 in)/65 cal DP guns; 35 × 25 mm AA guns (3×7 + 1×14); 4 × 610 mm (24 in) torpedo tubes; 8 × Type 93 torpedoes; 56 × Type 95 depth charges

Wakatsuki (若月; "Young Moon") was an Akizuki-class destroyer of the Imperial Japanese Navy. Wakatsuki played a minor role in the battle of the Empress Augusta Bay against a US cruiser-destroyer group, before surviving the bombing of Rabaul. After a series of escorting and transport missions, she escorted aircraft carriers at the disastrous battles of the Philippine Sea and Leyte Gulf, before being sunk by carrier aircraft at the battle of Ormoc Bay.

Ironically, Wakatsuki is probably the most heavily photographed of any Akizuki class destroyer, despite there not being a single existing photo of the ship taken by her Japanese owners, simply due to the sheer amount of aerial photos taken of the ship by US warplanes during the bombing of Rabaul and battles of Philippine Sea, Leyte Gulf, and Ormoc Bay.

== Design and description ==
The Akizuki-class ships were originally designed as anti-aircraft escorts for carrier battle groups, but were modified with torpedo tubes and depth charges to meet the need for more general-purpose destroyers. The ships measured 134.2 meters (440 ft 3 in) overall, with beams of 11.6 meters (38 ft 1 in) and drafts of 4.15 meters (13 ft 7 in). They displaced 2,701 long tons (2,744 t) at standard load and 3,420 long tons (3,470 t) at deep load. Their crews numbered 300 officers and enlisted men.

Each ship had two Kampon geared steam turbines, each driving one propeller shaft using steam provided by three Kampon water-tube boilers. The turbines were rated at a total of 52,000 shaft horsepower (38,776 kW) for a designed speed of 33 knots (61 km/h; 38 mph). The ships carried enough fuel oil to give them ranges of 8,300 nautical miles (15,400 km; 9,600 mi) at speeds of 18 knots (33 km/h; 21 mph).

The main armament of the Akizuki class consisted of eight 100-millimeter (3.9 in) Type 98 dual-purpose guns in four twin-gun turrets, two superfiring pairs fore and aft of the superstructure. They each carried a dozen 25-millimeter (1 in) Type 96 anti-aircraft (AA) guns in four triple-gun mounts. The ships were also each armed with four 610-millimeter (24 in) torpedo tubes in a single quadruple rotating mount amidships; one reload was carried for each tube. The first batch of ships were each equipped with two depth charge throwers for which 54 depth charges were carried. Wakatsuki was equipped with a Type 21 early-warning radar on her foremast.

== Construction and career ==
Wakatsuki was commissioned on 31 May 1943 into the 11th Destroyer Squadron for training. During these initial months, Wakatsuki operating alongside the destroyer Tamanami during their training duty of Hashirajima, including managing to tow the 40,000 ton battleship Nagato at a speed of 12 knots, and it was during this time period on the 8th of June that the battleship Mutsu suddenly and violently sank in harbor to a magazine detonation, prompting Wakatsuki and Tamanami to assist in rescuing 353 survivors.

On 22 June, Wakatsuki departed Japan for the first time to escort the battleship Musashi which was carrying the remains of Admiral Yamamoto. She then escorted the troop transport Sagara Maru when she was crippled by a torpedo from the submarine USS Harder, requiring her to be towed to Japan. Underway, she was hit by another two torpedoes from the submarine USS Pompano, which finished her off as Wakatsuki abandoned her to sink.

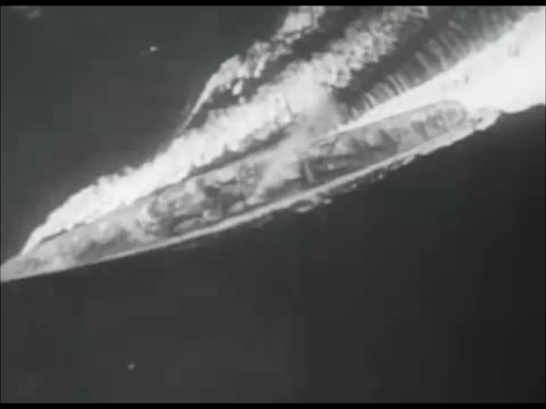
Wakatsuki under attack during the bombing of Rabaul, 5 November 1943. Still shot from newsreel

Shortly afterwards, Wakatsuki was reassigned to the 7th destroyer division with her sisterships Suzutsuki and Hatsuzuki, From 18-25 September, Wakatsuki escorted the combined fleet on a mission to counter US carrier raids, but no action occurred. A similar mission occurred from 17-26 October, and again they encountered no enemy forces, and from 30 October to 1 November she took part in a troop transport mission from Truk to Rabaul. Upon arriving, she was appointed as part of a task force with the goal of hunting attacking an allied cruiser force to replicate a battle of Savo Island style naval victory. This action occurred became the battle of the Empress Augusta Bay on 1-2 November. However, Wakatsuki contributed very little to the battle, unleashing several salvos of 3.9-inch (10 cm) gunfire, but missing her shots, before avoiding a collision with the heavy cruiser Haguro. In turn, the light cruiser Sendai and the destroyer Hatsukaze were sunk, and several other ships were damaged, sending off the Japanese task force and ending the battle in a US victory. Later over the course of several days, Rabaul was attacked by hundreds of land based and carrier aircraft, during which Wakatsuki was attacked by several aircraft, and damaged by bomb near misses but not directly hit. She was however caught on video by US dive bombers, and was shown in a news reel of the bombing of Rabaul. The US mistook Wakatsuki for a cruiser and claimed to sink her.

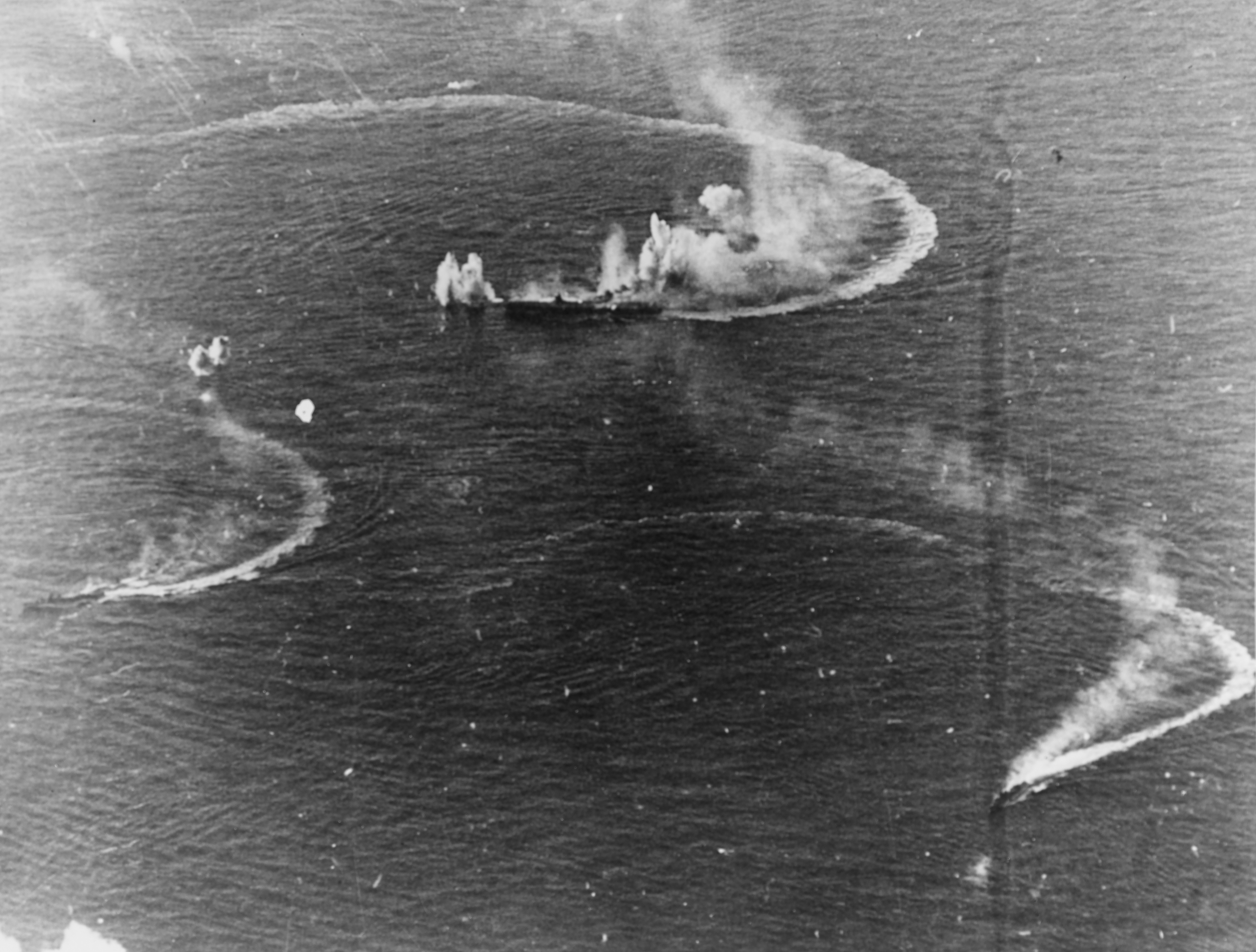
Japanese aircraft carrier Zuikaku during the battle of the Philippine Sea 20 June 1944. Wakatsuki (left) and Akizuki (right) are the two destroyers besides her.

In actuality, the destroyer only suffered minor damage, and took part in several troop transport and escort missions - being present during the sinking of the submarine USS Sculpin by the destroyer Yamagumo but not actually engaging - before being drydocked in Yokosuka for repairs from 25 November to the rest of the year. With the start of 1944, Wakatsuki escorted the aircraft carriers Shōkaku and Zuikaku from Kure to Singapore, before escorting the newly commissioned aircraft carrier Taihō. She remained with the carriers for the following months, before taking part in anti submarine patrol off Tawi-Tawi. On 6 June, she was present when the destroyer Minazuki was torpedoed and sunk by the familiar USS Harder, prompting Wakastuki to rescue 45 survivors. On 19 June, Wakatsuki served as a carrier escort during the battle of the Philippine Sea, specifically assigned to the Taihō. However, Taihō was torpedoed by the submarine USS Albacore and sank in a fiery explosion, prompting Wakatsuki to rescue survivors, transferring Admiral Ozawa to the heavy cruiser Haguro. In addition, the aircraft carriers Shōkaku and Hiyō and two oil tankers were sunk, ending the battle in a US victory as Wakatsuki managed to survive the carrier aircraft attacks the next day undamaged.

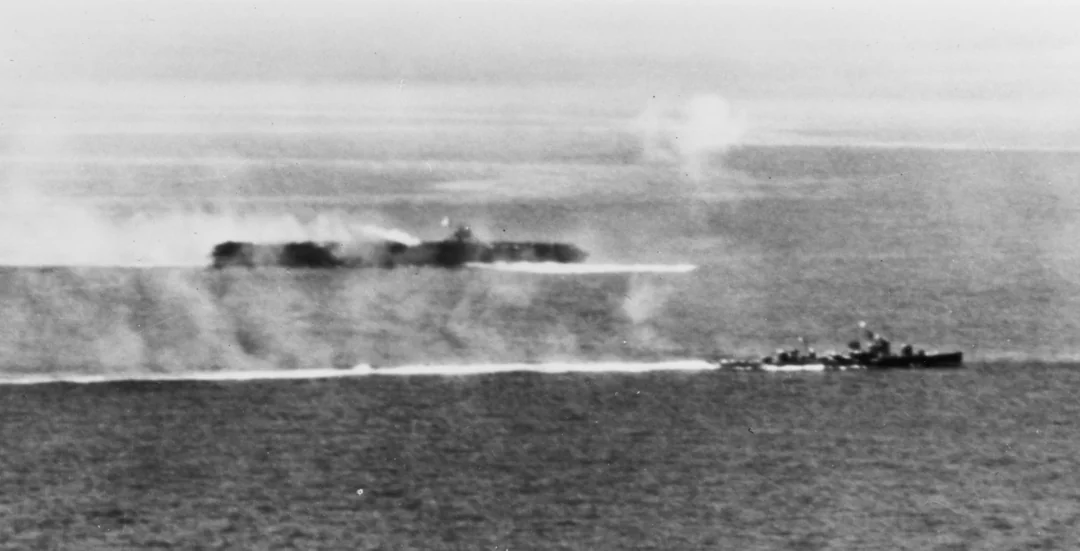
Zuikaku and Wakatsuki under attack during the Battle of Leyte Gulf, 25 October 1944.

After the battle, Wakatsuki escorted the fleet on a troop transport run between 8-20 July from Okinawa to Manila and then Lingga, and returned to Japan on 19 September with a tanker convoy. On 16 October, she arrived at the scene of her sistership Suzutsuki, which had been damaged by a torpedo from the submarine USS Sturgeon, and escorted her to Kure for repairs. On the 20th, she regrouped with the fleet in Brunei for Operation Sho-Go, better known as the Battle of Leyte Gulf, a final charge by the entire Japanese fleet to prevent the allied landings in the Philippines. Wakatsuki served her role as an escort to the decoy aircraft carrier force attempting to lure out American aircraft carriers, allowing for the powerful surface fleet to attack and sink US troop convoys.

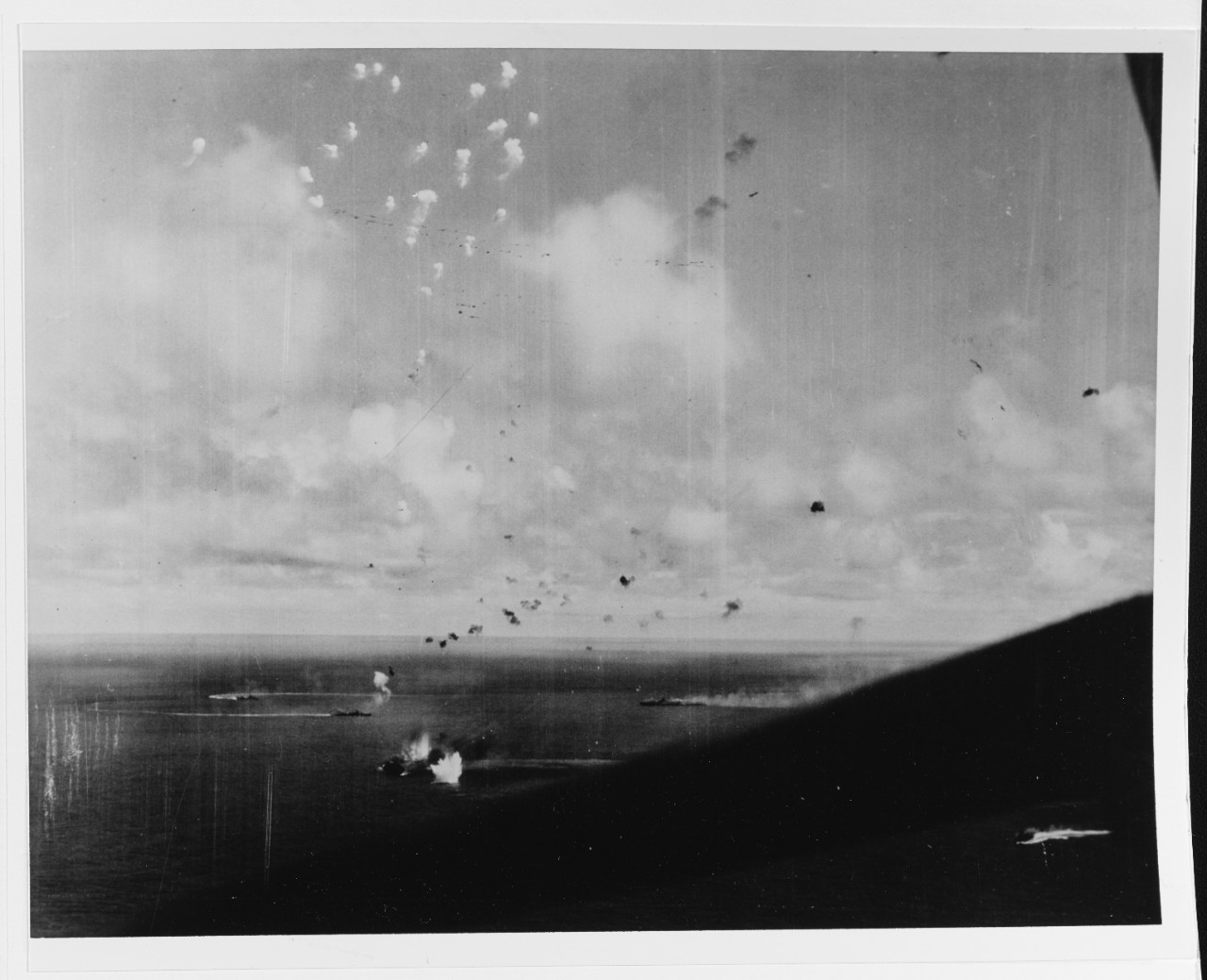
Zuikaku and Zuihō sinking. Wakatsuki (left) and Hatsuzuki (right) are seen to the left preparing to rescue survivors.

Departing Brunei on the 22nd, the aircraft carrier Zuikaku, the last remaining aircraft carrier to have attacked Pearl Harbor, and the light carriers Zuihō, Chitose, and Chiyoda, launched some 120 Kamikaze suicide bombers at the American fleet. Most either missed or were shot down. In turn, on the 25th the decoy force was raided by US carrier aircraft in what became the Battle off Cape Engaño. All four aircraft carriers, the light cruiser Tama, and the destroyer Akizuki were all either sunk or crippled and later finished off. Wakatsuki evaded several air attacks before helping to remove survivors from the dying Zuikaku. As this was being completed, a task force of US cruisers, which had delivered the coup de grâce to the crippled Chiyoda, pounced on the Japanese fleet, prompting the destroyer Hatsuzuki to sacrifice herself, taking the entire attention of the US cruisers and sinking with most of her crew while Wakatsuki and the other successfully retreated loaded with survivors.

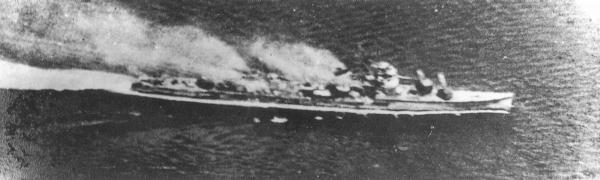
Wakatsuki under attack during the Battle of Ormoc Bay, 11 November 1944

Immediately after the battle, Wakatsuki returned to Brunei and unloaded hundreds of survivors from several sunken Japanese ships. From 29 October to 1 November, Wakatsuki escorted the light cruiser Ōyodo to Manila. Upon arriving, Wakatsuki was planned to take part on a fleet action, but on the 5th an air raid from USS Lexington sank the heavy cruiser Nachi and damaged the destroyers Akebono and Okinami, cancelling any plans of that.

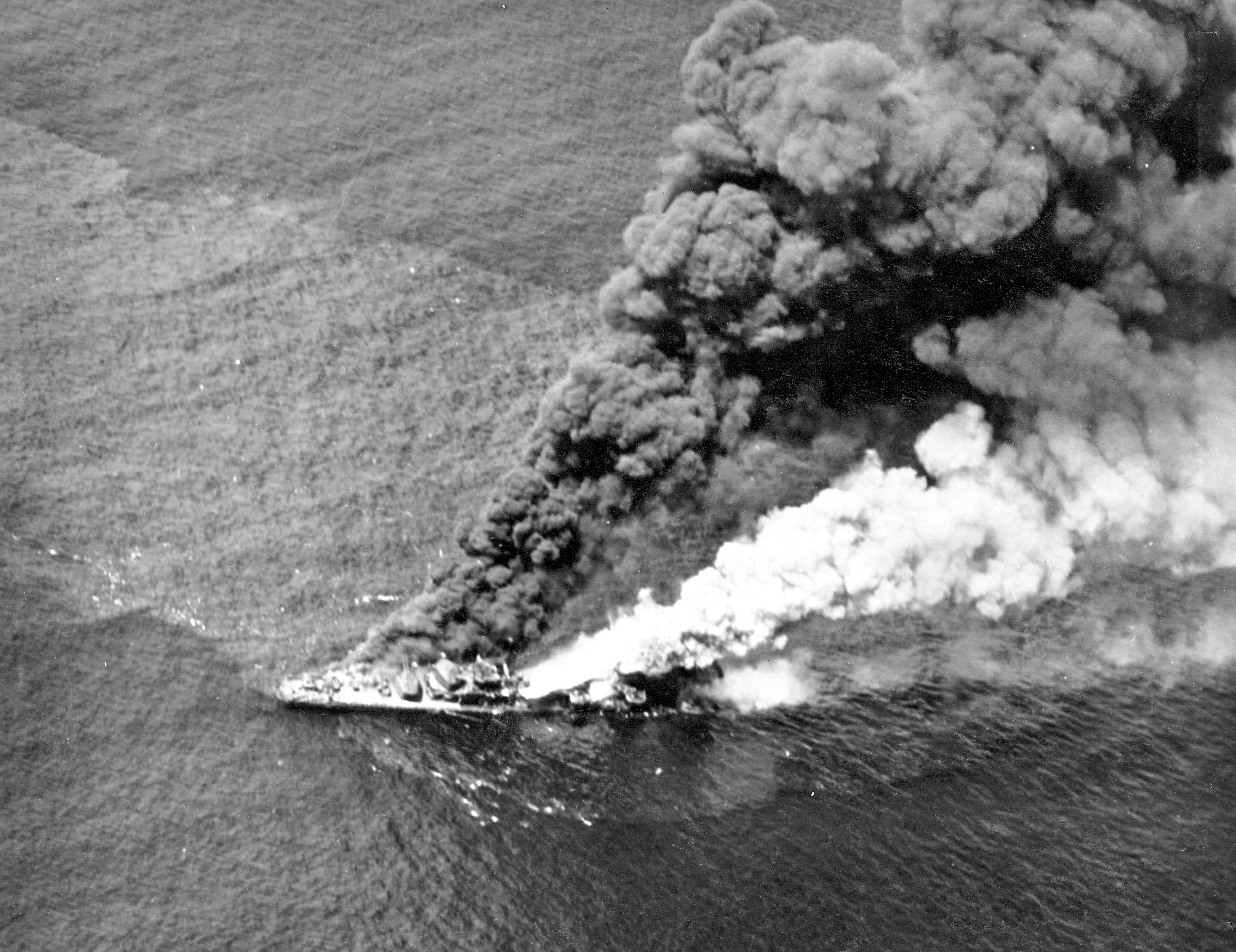
Wakatsuki sinking and on fire

On 8 November 1944, Wakatsuki, along with the destroyers Naganami, Hamanami, Asashimo, and Shimakaze departed Manila on an escort mission to four troop transports destined for Ormoc. The sailed smoothly for the first three days, but on the 11th, a total of 350 planes from US aircraft carriers were originally supposed to attack the battleship Yamato, but these orders were cancelled as they instead attacked the troop convoy in what became part of the overall Battle of Ormoc Bay. In a one sided massacre, all four troop transports were sunk with ease, and afterwards it was off to the destroyers. Multiple bombs and torpedoes sank Naganami, Hamanami, and Shimakaze, before it was Wakatsuki's turn, and luck was not on her side. She survived the initial attacks through excellent maneuverability, but eventually the first bomb hit the ship's bow, followed by another to her stern, immediately rendering her dead in the water. Attacking aircraft dogpiled Wakatsuki as she began to tip by the bow and sink. The abandon ship order was issued, and she sank bow first with a heavy loss of life, only 45 sailors made it to shore with 290 men going down with the ship.

== Rediscovery ==
Wakatsuki's wreck was discovered in early December 2017 by Microsoft co-founder Paul Allen's research vessel RV Petrel 869 ft (265 m) below the surface of Ormoc Bay. She was found to be heavily damaged from both her sinking and impact with the seafloor, resting on her starboard side.
