= Japanese destroyer Isokaze =

At least two warships of Japan have borne the name Isokaze:

- Japanese destroyer Isokaze (1916), an Imperial Japanese Navy Isokaze-class destroyer launched in 1916 and scrapped in 1935
- Japanese destroyer Isokaze (1939), an Imperial Japanese Navy Kagerō-class destroyer launched in 1939 and lost in 1945
