= Japanese destroyer Ōnami =

Three Japanese destroyers have been named Ōnami:

- Japanese destroyer Ōnami (1942), a Yūgumo-class destroyer of the Imperial Japanese Navy during World War II
- JDS Ōnami (DD-111), an Ayanami-class destroyer of the Japan Maritime Self-Defense Force (JMSDF)
- JS Ōnami (DD-111), a Takanami-class destroyer of the JMSDF
