= USS Gatling =

Fletcher-class destroyer

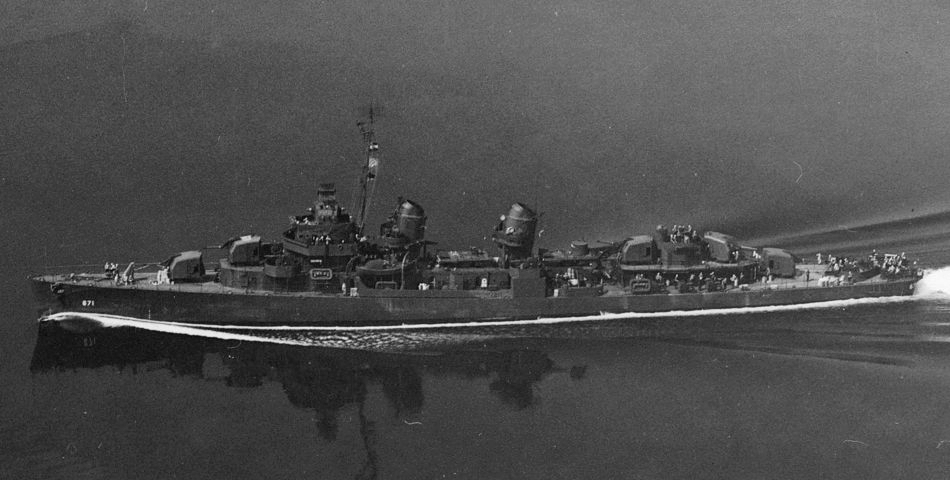
- Gatling in 1943

History

United States
- Name: USS Gatling
- Namesake: Richard Jordan Gatling
- Builder: Federal Shipbuilding and Drydock Company, Kearny, N.J.
- Laid down: 3 March 1943
- Launched: 20 June 1943
- Commissioned: 19 August 1943
- Decommissioned: 2 May 1960
- Stricken: 1 December 1974
- Fate: Sold for scrap, 22 February 1977

General characteristics
- Class & type: Fletcher-class destroyer
- Displacement: 2,050 tons
- Length: 376 ft 5 in (114.73 m)
- Beam: 39 ft 7 in (12.07 m)
- Draft: 17 ft 9 in (5.41 m)
- Propulsion: 60,000 shp (45,000 kW); geared turbines; 2 propellers
- Speed: 35 knots (65 km/h; 40 mph)
- Range: 6,500 nautical miles (12,000 km; 7,500 mi) at 15 kn (28 km/h; 17 mph)
- Complement: 329 officers and enlisted
- Armament: 5 × 5 in (127 mm)/38 DP guns, 10 × 40 mm AA guns, 7 × 20 mm AA guns, 10 × 21 in (53 cm) torpedo tubes, 6 × depth charge projectors, 2 × depth charge tracks

USS Gatling (DD-671) was a Fletcher-class destroyer of the United States Navy, named after Richard Jordan Gatling, the inventor of the Gatling gun.

Gatling was laid down 3 March 1943 by the Federal Shipbuilding and Drydock Company, Kearny, New Jersey; launched 20 June 1943; sponsored by Mrs. John W. Gatling, wife of the inventor's grandson; and commissioned 19 August 1943 at New York Navy Yard.

== World War II ==
After shakedown out of Bermuda and alteration at New York early November, the new destroyer called at Norfolk, Virginia, to conduct training cruises for crews of destroyers still under construction.

On 19 November 1943 Gatling proceeded to Trinidad, British West Indies, to escort aircraft carrier Langley to Norfolk. Gatling stood out from Norfolk 3 December, escorting Intrepid through the Panama Canal to San Francisco, California, arriving 22 December. The next day she sailed for Pearl Harbor.

=== 1944 ===
On 16 January 1944 Gatling sortied with the Fast Carrier Task Force (then Fifth Fleet's TF 58, also known as Third Fleet's TF 38) to support the forthcoming invasion of the Marshall Islands; thereafter, Gatling was continuously with the carrier task forces as they struck Japanese outposts and finally hit the heart of Japan itself.

In February the first carrier strikes against Truk occurred. Gatling provided fire support during the raid and screened the flattops during raids on the Marianas a few days later. In March she joined in the attack on Emirau Island and at the beginning of April in the air strikes against the Palau Archipelago. Steaming south to strike Hollandia, Wakde Airfield, Sawar Airfield and Sarmi, Western New Guinea, the task force supported Army landings at Aitape, Tanahmerah Bay, and Humboldt Bay from 21 to 26 April. During this action, Gatling stood radar picket duty and directed fighter planes. After new attacks on Truk late April 1944, Gatling supported the invasion and occupation of the Marianas from 10 June to 5 July. In the Battle of the Philippine Sea, 19 and 20 July, Gatling was credited with shooting down or aiding in the destruction of six Japanese planes.

Late that month, carrier task forces again struck the Palaus and blasted Yap and Ulithi. In early August the Bonin Islands became targets for Gatling guns, and in September the carriers she guarded repeatedly struck Japanese targets in the Philippines.

October saw attacks against Okinawa beginning on 10 October and against Formosa, Luzon, and the Visayas from ll-23 October. On 24 October, after enemy bombs had sunk the light aircraft carrier Princeton in the Battle of the Sibuyan Sea, Gatling rescued over 300 of the vessel's survivors. For heroism in saving these men, four Gatling crewmen were awarded the Navy and Marine Corps Medal, and 16 others received the Bronze Star.

Gatling landed the survivors at Ulithi and rejoined the carrier task force for November and December strikes against the Philippines. After powerful Typhoon Cobra, in which three destroyers capsized, Gatling searched for survivors and helped to save over 100 men from the sea.

=== 1945 ===
At Christmas 1944, the destroyer returned to Ulithi. The task force sortied 29 December to strike Formosa and Luzon during January 1945. Hoping to locate and destroy a Japanese fleet in that area, Admiral William Halsey took the task force into the South China Sea 10 January and hit targets in Indochina and on the China coast.

In the middle of February, the carriers launched initial attacks against Honshū with Tokyo as their main target. As part of a picket line over 30 miles in advance of the main forces, Gatling was once within 40 miles (64 km) of Honshū. On 19 and 20 February, as part of Destroyer Division 99 (DesDiv 99), she escorted North Carolina and Indianapolis to Iwo Jima to support the gallant Marines who were fighting to wrest that volcanic fortress from Japan to become a base for B-29s damaged over the home islands. Rejoining the carrier task force, Gatling aided in new strikes against Honshū and Okinawa in late February and early March. She returned to Iwo Jima independently and throughout March blasted Japanese shore batteries to support the invasion. During this duty, the versatile and busy destroyer saved the entire crew of a B-29 bomber forced down while returning from a mission against Nagoya.

On 29 March 1945, she stood out from Iwo Jima, escorting transports carrying victorious marines to Guam. The destroyer then sailed to the United States for well-earned overhaul and repairs, arriving San Francisco 18 April.

After repairs and refresher training, Gatling escorted New Jersey and Biloxi to Eniwetok, bombarding Wake Island en route. Continuing to escort New Jersey, she arrived at Guam 9 August. There the news came that Japan had accepted the provisions of the Potsdam Declaration and agreed to surrender. Gatling now headed for Japan escorting transports bearing the 4th Marine Division as the 3d Fleet rendezvoused off Japan. On 3 September 1945, Gatling steamed into Tokyo Bay as a unit of the Allied Naval Occupation Forces of Japan.

During her aggressive career in World War II, Gatling traveled over 175,000 miles (282,000 km) and fired 77 tons of high explosives from her guns. She sank two enemy ships and splashed eight Japanese planes, either as kills or assists. In addition to her other rescue missions, preserving the lives of over 400 sailors, she saved 37 aviators forced to ditch at sea. Finally, these heroic exploits through two busy battle-filled years were accomplished without the loss of a single man from enemy action, sickness, or accident.

Gatling decommissioned 16 July 1946 and entered the Atlantic Reserve Fleet at Charleston, South Carolina

== 1951–60 ==
After fighting erupted in Korea, the veteran destroyer recommissioned 4 June 1951 at Charleston, South Carolina. Until August 1952, she operated off the Atlantic coast and in the West Indies before proceeding to the Boston Navy Yard for repairs.

In the fall of 1952, Gatling (as a unit of the NATO forces) stood out of Newport, Rhode Island, bound for Europe; she visited Scotland, Norway, and Belgium in Operation Mainbrace. Later she was active in Operation Springboard, calling at St. Thomas, Virgin Islands and San Juan, Puerto Rico, in the Caribbean Sea. Returning to the Far Eastern waters she knew so well, Gatling arrived at Tokyo 3 June 1953, and joined Task Force 77. supporting United Nations forces in Korea. Then, following the sun, she steamed to Manila, Saigon, Singapore, Colombo, and, passing through the Suez Canal, called at France] and Portugal. She returned to Philadelphia in December 1953.

After repairs and training in New England waters, Gatling sailed to Portugal, France, and Italy. Recrossing the Atlantic and transiting the Panama Canal, the destroyer arrived Guayaquil, Ecuador, 7 October 1955. The following year she visited France and Cuba as a part of her varied operating schedule.

In 1957 Gatling again took part in NATO exercises, calling at Spain, Greece, Turkey, and Lebanon. Further operations brought her to England, to Spain again, and in 1958 to San Juan and Cuba. Her last major operations took her to Mediterranean ports of call, Pakistan and Iran, after which Gatling returned to her home base at Rhode Island 11 October 1959.

Gatling, after distinguished service in war and peace, again decommissioned 2 May 1960 and entered the Atlantic Reserve Fleet at Norfolk. She was stricken from the Naval Vessel Register 1 December 1974, sold 22 February 1977 and broken up for scrap.

== Awards ==
Gatling received eight battle stars for World War II service and one battle star for Korean War service.
