= Japanese destroyer Hatsuzuki =

Akizuki-class destroyer

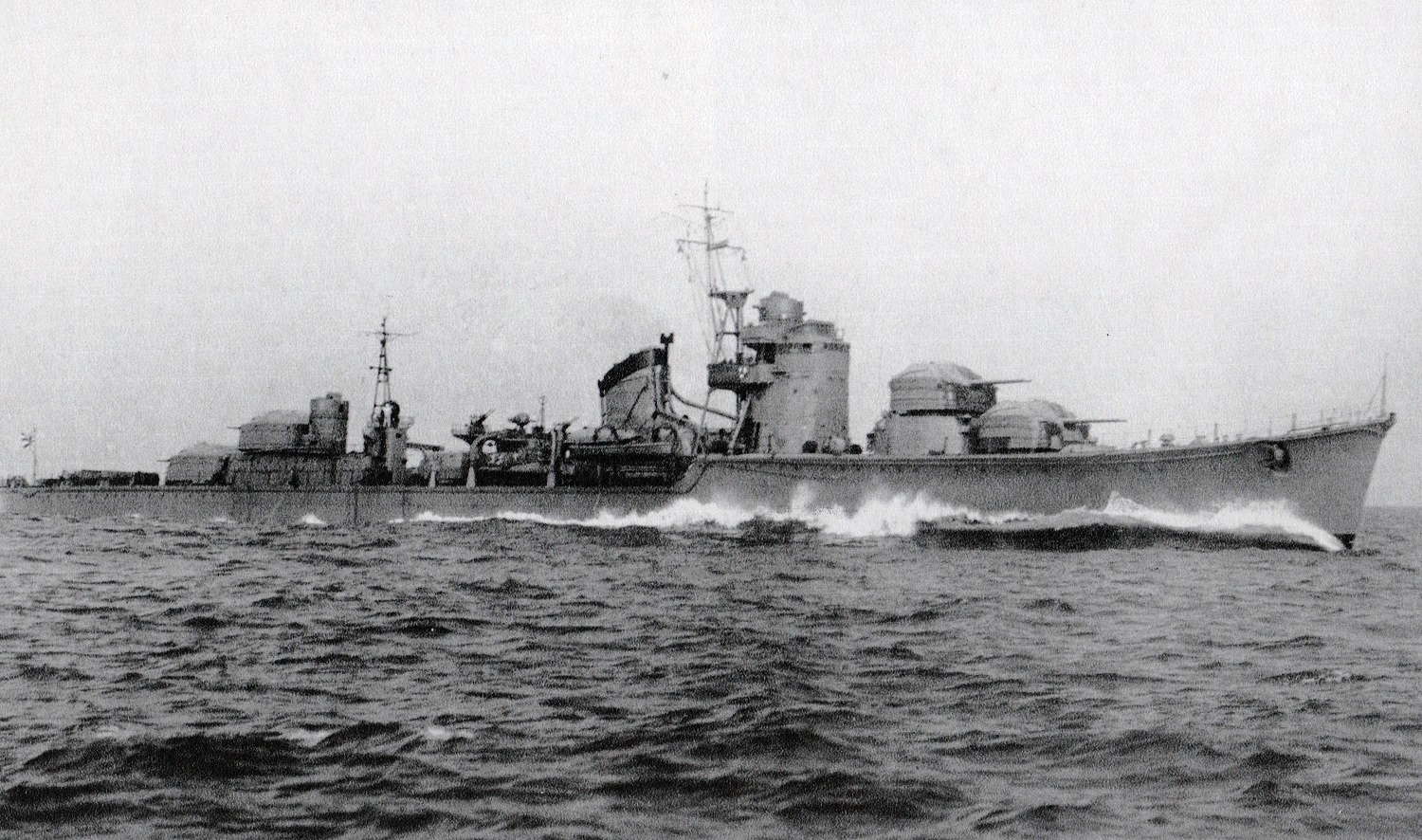
- Hatsuzuki on trials, December 1942

History

Empire of Japan
- Name: Hatsuzuki
- Builder: Maizuru Naval Arsenal
- Laid down: 25 July 1941
- Launched: 3 April 1942
- Completed: 29 December 1942
- Commissioned: 29 December 1942
- Stricken: 10 December 1944
- Fate: Sunk, 25 October 1944

General characteristics
- Class & type: Akizuki-class destroyer
- Displacement: 2,700 long tons (2,743 t) standard; 3,700 long tons (3,759 t) full load
- Length: 134.2 m (440 ft 3 in)
- Beam: 11.6 m (38 ft 1 in)
- Draft: 4.15 m (13 ft 7 in)
- Propulsion: 3 × Kampon type boilers; 2 × Kampon geared turbines; 2 × shafts, 50,000 shp (37 MW)
- Speed: 33 knots (38 mph; 61 km/h)
- Range: 8,300 nmi (15,400 km) at 18 kn (21 mph; 33 km/h)
- Complement: 263
- Armament: December 1942 : 8 × 100 mm (4 in)/65 cal Type 98 DP guns; 4 × Type 96 25 mm (0.98 in) AA guns (2×2); 4 × 610 mm (24 in) torpedo tubes; 8 × Type 93 torpedoes; 56 × Type 95 depth charges; October 1944 : 8 × 100 mm (4 in)/65 cal DP guns; 29 × 25 mm AA guns (5×3 + 14×1); 4 × 610 mm (24 in) torpedo tubes; 8 × Type 93 torpedoes; 56 × Type 95 depth charges

Hatsuzuki (初月) was an Akizuki-class destroyer of the Imperial Japanese Navy. Her name means "New Moon (in Autumn)" or "(another name of) August". In the Battle off Cape Engaño, to cover the escape of allied ships, Hatsuzuki single-handedly faced an overwhelming force of four cruisers and at least 9 destroyers for two hours before she was sunk with only 8 survivors.

== Design and description ==
The Akizuki-class ships were originally designed as anti-aircraft escorts for carrier battle groups, but were modified with torpedo tubes and depth charges to meet the need for more general-purpose destroyers. The ships measured 134.2 meters (440 ft 3 in) overall, with beams of 11.6 meters (38 ft 1 in) and drafts of 4.15 meters (13 ft 7 in). They displaced 2,701 long tons (2,744 t) at standard load and 3,420 long tons (3,470 t) at deep load. Their crews numbered 300 officers and enlisted men.

Each ship had two Kampon geared steam turbines, each driving one propeller shaft using steam provided by three Kampon water-tube boilers. The turbines were rated at a total of 52,000 shaft horsepower (38,776 kW) for a designed speed of 33 knots (61 km/h; 38 mph). The ships carried enough fuel oil to give them ranges of 8,300 nautical miles (15,400 km; 9,600 mi) at speeds of 18 knots (33 km/h; 21 mph).

The main armament of the Akizuki class consisted of eight 100-millimeter (3.9 in) Type 98 dual-purpose guns in four twin-gun turrets, two superfiring pairs fore and aft of the superstructure. They each carried a dozen 25-millimeter (1 in) Type 96 anti-aircraft (AA) guns in four triple-gun mounts. The ships were also each armed with four 610-millimeter (24 in) torpedo tubes in a single quadruple rotating mount amidships; one reload was carried for each tube. The first batch of ships were each equipped with two depth charge throwers for which 54 depth charges were carried. Hatsuzuki was equipped with a Type 21 early-warning radar on her foremast.

== Career and fate ==
In October 1944 Hatsuzuki was part of the Northern Force commanded by Admiral Jisaburo Ozawa, in the Japanese attack on the Allied forces supporting the invasion of Leyte.

On 25 October, during the Battle off Cape Engaño, Hatsuzuki encountered a detachment of Halsey's Task Force 34 (TF.34) consisting of the four cruisers USS New Orleans, USS Wichita, USS Santa Fe and USS Mobile and at least 9 destroyers. Hatsuzuki single-handedly faced off against this overwhelming force for the next two hours while covering the escape of survivors of the aircraft carriers Zuikaku, Zuihō and Chitose by the Destroyers Wakatsuki, Kuwa and the Light cruiser Isuzu, eventually exploding and sinking at 2059. East-northeast of Cape Engaño (20°24′N 126°20′E).

The only survivors of her crew were 8 men in a lifeboat with 17 Zuikaku crewmen who made their way to Luzon by 14 November, having been providentially cast off when Hatsuzuki got underway to engage the enemy.
