= Japanese destroyer Takanami =

Three Japanese destroyers have been named Takanami:

- Japanese destroyer Takanami (1942), a Yūgumo-class destroyer of the Imperial Japanese Navy during World War II
- JDS Takanami, an Ayanami-class destroyer of the Japanese Maritime Self-Defense Force (JMSDF), decommissioned in 1989
- JS Takanami (DD-110), a Takanami-class destroyer of the JMSDF, on active duty as of 2011
