= Battle of the Philippine Sea =

Major naval battle of World War II

Coordinates: 20.0000°N 130.0000°E

- Part of the Mariana and Palau Islands campaign of the Pacific Theater (World War II)
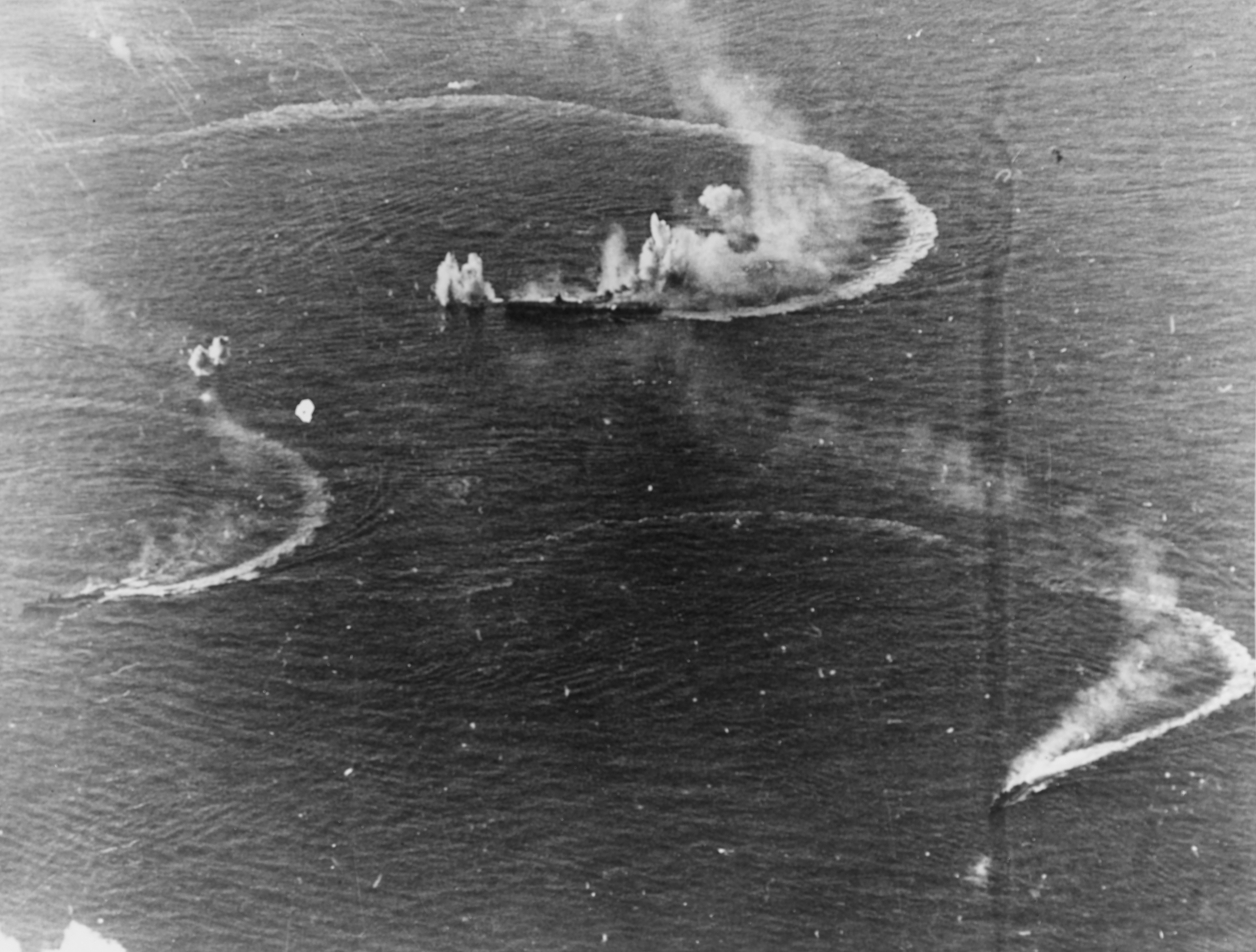
- The carrier Zuikaku (center) and two destroyers under attack by U.S. Navy carrier aircraft, 20 June 1944
Date	19–20 June 1944
Location	Philippine Sea
Result	American victory

Belligerents
United States	Japan

Commanders and leaders
(United States) Raymond A. Spruance; (United States) Marc Mitscher	(Empire of Japan) Jisaburō Ozawa; (Empire of Japan) Takeo Kurita; (Empire of Japan) Takeo Takagi; (Empire of Japan) Kakuji Kakuta

Units involved
U.S. 5th Fleet	1st Mobile Fleet

Strength
7 fleet carriers; 8 light carriers; 7 battleships; 8 heavy cruisers; 13 light cruisers; 68 destroyers; 28 submarines; ~900 carrier aircraft	3 fleet carriers; 6 light carriers; 5 battleships; 7 heavy cruisers; 2 light cruisers; 31 destroyers; 24 submarines; 6 oilers; ~450 carrier aircraft; ~300 land-based aircraft

Casualties and losses
1 battleship damaged; 123 aircraft destroyed; 109 dead	2 fleet carriers sunk; 1 light carrier sunk; 2 oilers sunk; 550–645 aircraft destroyed; 1 fleet carrier damaged; 2 light carriers damaged; 1 battleship damaged; 1 oiler damaged; 2,987 dead (est.)

The Battle of the Philippine Sea was a major naval battle of World War II on 19–20 June 1944 that eliminated the Imperial Japanese Navy's ability to conduct large-scale carrier actions. It took place during the United States' amphibious reconquest of the Mariana Islands during the Pacific War. The battle was the last of five major "carrier-versus-carrier" engagements between American and Japanese naval forces, (Note: Historians, such as Prof. Douglas V. Smith of the Naval War College in the cited work, count the five "major" battles as Coral Sea, Midway, Eastern Solomons, Santa Cruz, and Philippine Sea. The October 1944 Battle off Cape Engaño did see a decoy force built around four IJN carriers, divested of all but 108 aircraft, lure an American-led fleet, including ten carriers with 600–1,000 aircraft, away from protecting the transports at the landing beaches of Leyte. That ostensible IJN carrier group was quickly destroyed.) and pitted elements of the United States Navy's Fifth Fleet against ships and aircraft of the Imperial Japanese Navy's Mobile Fleet and nearby island garrisons. The battle was the largest carrier-to-carrier engagement in history, involving 24 aircraft carriers, deploying roughly 1,350 carrier-based aircraft.

The aerial part of the battle was nicknamed the Great Marianas Turkey Shoot by American aviators for the severely disproportional loss ratio inflicted upon Japanese aircraft by American pilots and anti-aircraft gunners. During a debriefing after the first two air battles, a pilot from USS Lexington remarked "Why, hell, it was just like an old-time turkey shoot down home!" The outcome is generally attributed to a wealth of highly trained American pilots with superior tactics and numerical superiority, and new anti-aircraft ship defensive technology (including the top-secret anti-aircraft proximity fuze), versus the Japanese use of replacement pilots with not enough flight hours in training and little to no combat experience. Furthermore, the Japanese defensive plans had been directly obtained by the Allies from the wreckage of a plane carrying the commander-in-chief of the Imperial Japanese Navy's Combined Fleet, Admiral Mineichi Koga, in March 1944. (Note: The Americans now used and were becoming practiced with the new radar-based Combat Information Center, and anti-air defensive firepower was delivered on target. Unlike the overburdened radio channels and lost messages experienced in the Battle of Midway, the U.S. fleet had sufficient frequencies and communications training, discipline, experience, and doctrine to maintain good command coordination and control during the largest such battle ever.) (Note: Radar directed detection and interception allowed the American Combat Air Patrol (CAP) to intercept and surprise 370 inbound Japanese over fifty miles from the carriers and destroy about 250 in just that one encounter. ("The Race for Radar and Stealth", 2006, Weapons Races program on the Military Channel affiliate of the Discovery network, rebroadcast periodically.) Japanese aircraft which managed to get through the CAP faced a well-organized line of cruisers and battleships, thanks to the new command and control philosophy which concentrated anti-aircraft firepower, and they were equipped with the highly effective VT-fuzed anti-aircraft shells. None of the American carriers were damaged, despite several near misses, while one battleship suffered a bomb hit but remained fully operational.)

During the course of the battle, American submarines torpedoed and sank two of the largest Japanese fleet carriers taking part in the battle. The American carriers launched a protracted strike, sinking one light carrier and damaging other ships, but most of the American aircraft returning to their carriers ran low on fuel as night fell. Eighty American planes were lost. Although at the time the battle appeared to be a missed opportunity to destroy the Japanese fleet, the Imperial Japanese Navy had lost the bulk of its carrier air strength and would never recover. This battle, along with the Battle of Leyte Gulf four months later, marked the end of Japanese aircraft carrier operations. The few surviving carriers remained mostly in port thereafter.

== Background ==
=== Japanese plan for a decisive battle ===
From the very start of the conflict in December 1941, the Japanese war plan had been to inflict such severe and painful losses on the US military that its public would become war weary and the American government would be convinced to sue for peace and allow Japan to keep its conquests.

Admiral Isoroku Yamamoto had grown wary of this strategy, but he was killed in Operation Vengeance on 18 April 1943. The following day, Admiral Mineichi Koga succeeded Yamamoto as commander-in-chief of the Combined Fleet, and Koga wanted the Imperial Japanese Navy to engage the American fleet in the "single decisive battle" in early 1944. On 31 March 1944 Koga was killed when his aircraft, a Kawanishi H8K, flew into a typhoon and crashed. Koga's chief of staff, Vice Admiral Shigeru Fukudome, was flying in an accompanying plane and carrying the Z Plan documents, and also crashed. Fukudome survived, but the Z Plan briefcase did not sink with the destroyed aircraft and was recovered by Filipino guerillas who over the next few weeks transported the documents to General Douglas MacArthur's Military Intelligence Service (MIS) in Brisbane, Australia. MIS forwarded the translated Z Plan to Admiral Chester Nimitz in Honolulu, and the Japanese plans were quickly dispatched to the fleet commanders in the Philippine Sea in June. A new commander-in-chief of the Combined Fleet, Admiral Soemu Toyoda, was appointed, and he finalized the Japanese plans known as Plan A-Go or Operation A-Go. Operation A-Go did not change much from the Z Plan, so the U.S. Navy knew almost exactly what was going to happen during the upcoming naval battle. The plan was adopted in early June 1944. Within weeks, an opportunity arose to engage the American fleet now detected heading for Saipan.

The Japanese had some advantages they hoped would turn the battle in their favor. Though outnumbered in ships and aircraft, they planned to supplement their carrier airpower with land-based aircraft. With land-based aircraft numbering from 250-540, the intended purpose was for Japanese aircraft across Guam, Tinian, and Rota to bomb the U.S. fleet, refuel on the nearby island bases, and then continue their assault. This process of flying from home base to bomb an initial target, and then continue to a different location where they are refueled and rearmed is known as shuttle bombing.

=== Advantages for the Americans ===
Meanwhile, IJN aircrew losses, suffered during earlier carrier battles at Coral Sea, Midway, and the long Solomon Islands campaign of 1942–43, had greatly weakened the Japanese Navy's ability to project force with its carriers. Losses suffered in the Solomons drastically reduced the number of skilled carrier pilots available to fill the carrier air groups. It took nearly a year for the Japanese to reconstitute their groups following the Solomons campaign.

Japan no longer had enough oil tankers to transport the required volume of petroleum from the Dutch East Indies to Japanese refineries. Without adequate supplies of refined residual fuel oil, Japanese aircraft carriers refueled with unrefined Tarakan petroleum in June 1944. This undesalted petroleum damaged boiler tubes, and the unremoved naphtha fraction volatilized the fuel to form explosive atmospheres incompatible with aircraft carrier damage control procedures.

In early 1944 the U.S. fleet continued its advance in a steady progression across the islands of the central Pacific. While U.S. commanders, particularly Admiral Spruance, were concerned about the Japanese trying to attack U.S. transports and newly landed forces, the Japanese objective was actually to engage and defeat the Fast Carrier Task Force in a decisive battle.

== Initial stages ==
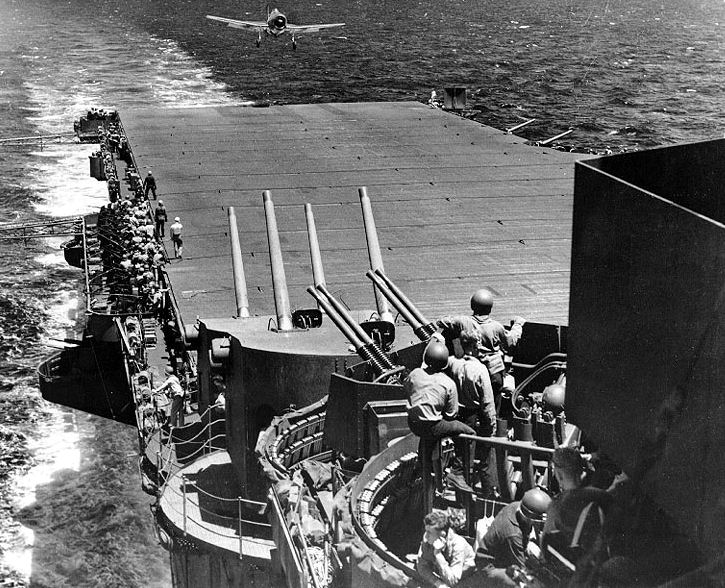
F6F-3 landing aboard Lexington, flagship of Task Force 58

On 12 June 1944 U.S. carriers made air strikes on the Marianas, convincing Admiral Soemu Toyoda that the U.S. was preparing to invade. This move came as a surprise; the Japanese had expected the next U.S. target to be further south, either at the Carolines or the Palaus, and had protected the Marianas with only 50 land-based aircraft. On 13–15 June, American carriers made additional airstrikes while surface forces bombarded the Marianas. On 15 June, the first American troops went ashore on Saipan.

Since control of the Marianas would bring American strategic bombers within range of the Japanese home islands, the IJN decided it was time for the long-awaited Kantai Kessen (decisive battle). Toyoda immediately ordered a fleet-based counterattack, committing nearly all of the Japanese navy's serviceable ships.

The main portions of the fleet rendezvoused on 16 June in the western part of the Philippine Sea and completed refueling on 17 June. Admiral Jisaburō Ozawa commanded this force from his newly commissioned flagship, Taihō. In addition to extensive command facilities, reinforced torpedo blisters and a large air group, Taihō was the first Japanese carrier with an armor-plated flight deck, designed to withstand bomb hits with minimal damage.

At 18:35 on 15 June the submarine USS Flying Fish sighted a Japanese carrier and battleship force coming out of the San Bernardino Strait. An hour later USS Seahorse spotted a battleship and cruiser force steaming up from the south, 200 miles (320 km) east of Mindanao. The submarines were under orders to report sightings before attempting to attack, so Flying Fish waited until nightfall, then surfaced to radio in its report. Fifth Fleet commander Spruance was convinced that a major battle was at hand. After consulting with Nimitz at Pacific Fleet Headquarters in Hawaii, he ordered Rear Admiral Marc Mitscher, commander of the Fast Carrier Task Force (Task Force 58), who had sent two carrier task groups north to intercept aircraft reinforcements from Japan, to reform and move west of Saipan into the Philippine Sea. TF 52's battleships, cruisers and escort carrier groups were ordered to remain near Saipan to protect the invasion fleet and provide air support for the landings.

Shortly before midnight on 18 June Nimitz radioed Spruance that a Japanese vessel had broken radio silence. The message intercepted was an apparent dispatch from Ozawa to his land-based air forces on Guam. Radio direction-finding placed the sender approximately 355 miles (571 km) west-southwest of TF 58. Mitscher considered whether the radio messages were a Japanese deception, as the Japanese were known to send a single vessel off to break radio silence, to mislead their adversaries about the actual location of the main force.

Mitscher realized that there was a chance of a night surface encounter with Ozawa's forces. Arleigh Burke, Mitscher's chief of staff (a former destroyer squadron commander who had won several night battles in the Solomons), assumed that battle line commander Willis Lee would welcome the opportunity. But Lee strongly opposed such an encounter. Having personally experienced a confused night action off Guadalcanal, Lee was not enthusiastic about a night engagement with Japanese surface forces, believing that his crews were not adequately trained for it. Shortly after learning Lee's opinion, Mitscher requested permission from Spruance to move TF 58 west during the night, to reach a launch position at dawn that would allow for a maximum aerial assault on the enemy force. Spruance considered for an hour, then refused Mitscher's request. Mitscher's staff was disappointed with Spruance's decision. Burke later commented: "We knew we were going to have hell slugged out of us in the morning. We knew we couldn't reach them. We knew they could reach us."

Spruance's decision was influenced by his orders from Nimitz, who had made it clear that the protection of the invasion fleet was the primary mission of TF 58. Spruance had concerns that the Japanese would attempt to draw his main fleet away from the Marianas with a diversionary force while slipping an attack force in to destroy the landing fleet. Locating and destroying the Japanese fleet was not his primary objective, and he was unwilling to allow the main strike force of the Pacific Fleet to be drawn westward, away from the amphibious forces. Mitscher accepted the decision without comment. Spruance's decision in this matter, although subsequently criticized, was certainly justified; by this point in the war, it was well known that Japanese operational plans frequently relied on the use of decoys and diversionary forces. Spruance, as it turned out, was acting appropriately to the Japanese plans that called for a diversion to draw the fleet far away so there would be a great opportunity for land-based Japanese planes to also augment the carrier aircraft to attack Spruance's fleet.

Before daybreak, Spruance suggested that if the daybreak searches revealed no targets, the bombers could be sent to crater the airfields on Rota and Guam. However, the fleet's contact-fused bombs had been largely used up in the earlier strikes, and Mitscher was left with only the armor-piercing bombs needed to combat the Japanese fleet, so he informed Spruance he could not launch such strikes. As the morning broke, TF 58 launched search aircraft, combat air patrols (CAP) and anti-submarine patrols and then turned the fleet west to gain maneuvering room from the islands. The U.S. Navy had developed a sophisticated air control system, which vectored CAP fighters by radar to intercept enemy bombers well before they reached the fleet. Any attackers that got through the CAP would then face a "gun line" of screening battleships and cruisers that would put up devastating barrages of VT-fuzed anti-aircraft fire before the attackers reached the aircraft carriers.

== Battle ==
Map of the Battle of the Philippine Sea

=== Early actions ===
The Japanese had already launched their morning search patrols, using some of the 50 aircraft stationed on Guam, and at 05:50 one of these, a Mitsubishi A6M Zero, found TF-58. After radioing his sighting of U.S. ships, the bomb-carrying Zero attacked picket destroyer Stockham but was shot down by the destroyer Yarnall.

Alerted, the Japanese began launching their Guam-based aircraft for an attack. These were spotted on radar by U.S. ships. A group of thirty Grumman F6F Hellcats were dispatched from USS Belleau Wood to deal with the threat. The Hellcats arrived while aircraft were still launching from Orote Field. Minutes later, additional radar contacts were seen, which were later discovered to be the additional forces being sent north from the other islands. A battle broke out in which 35 Japanese aircraft were shot down for the loss of a single Hellcat. It was a pattern that would be repeated throughout the day. At 09:57 large numbers of Japanese aircraft were picked up approaching the fleet. Mitscher said to Burke, "Get those fighters back from Guam." The call "Hey, Rube!" was sent out. (Note: "Hey Rube!" was the old circus cry used to call for help in a fight. The Navy borrowed it to signal fighters they were needed over the ship.) The fleet held steady until 10:23, when Mitscher ordered TF 58 to turn into the wind on course east-southeast, and ordered all fighter aircraft aloft, deployed in several layers of CAP to await the Japanese. He then sent his bomber aircraft aloft to orbit open waters to the east rather than leaving them in a hangar deck full of aircraft vulnerable to a Japanese bomb attack.

=== Japanese raids ===
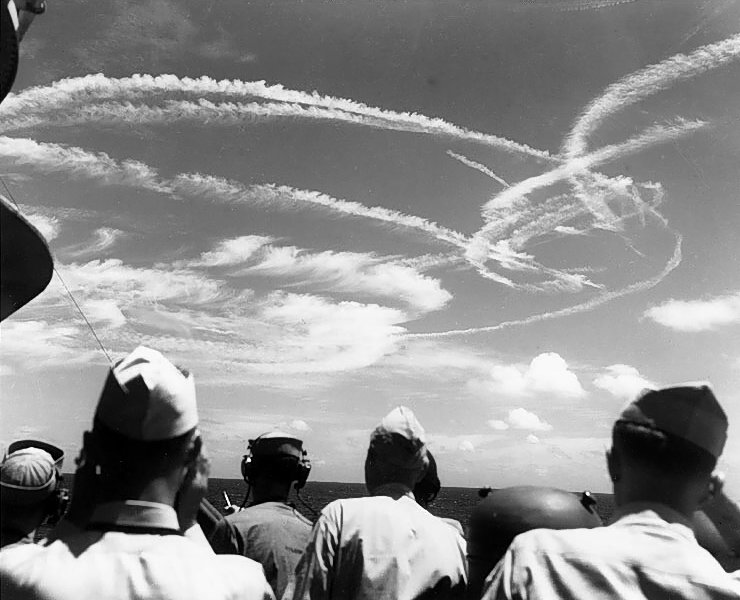
Fighter aircraft contrails mark the sky over Task Force 58, 19 June 1944

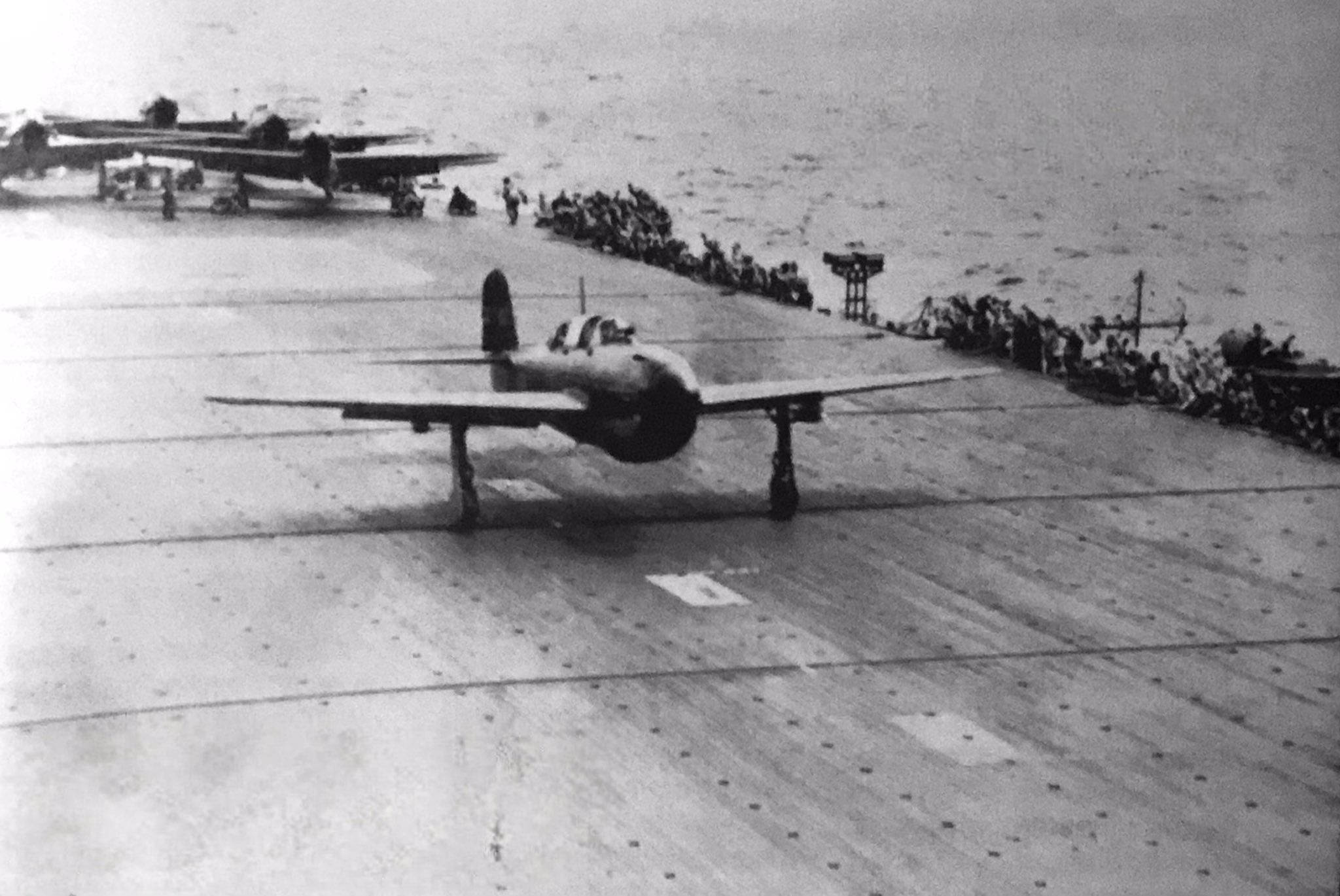
Yokosuka D4Y1 Suisei Model 11 "Judy" dive-bomber of the 652nd Kōkūtai (Air Group) taking off from the aircraft carrier Jun'yō during the Battle of Philippine Sea (19 June 1944). This aircraft was part of Jun'yō's second wave that was launched at 10:30 am on 19 June 1944, which consisted of 9 D4Y1s escorted by 6 A6M5s.

The recall had been ordered after several ships in TF 58 picked up radar contacts 150 miles (240 km) to the west around 10:00. This was the first of the raids from the Japanese carrier forces, with 68 aircraft. TF 58 started launching every fighter it could; by the time they were in the air the Japanese had closed to 70 miles (110 km). However, the Japanese began circling to regroup their formations for the attack. This 10-minute delay proved critical, and the first group of Hellcats met the raid, still at 70 miles (110 km), at 10:36. They were quickly joined by additional groups. Within minutes, 25 Japanese aircraft had been shot down, against the loss of only one U.S. aircraft.

The Japanese aircraft that survived were met by other fighters, and 16 more were shot down. Of the 27 aircraft which remained, some made attacks on the picket destroyers USS Yarnall and Stockham but caused no damage. Between three and six bombers broke through to Lee's battleship group and attacked; one bomb hit the main deck of USS South Dakota, killing or injuring over 50 men but failing to disable her. South Dakota was the only American ship damaged in this attack. No aircraft of Ozawa's first wave got through to the American carriers.

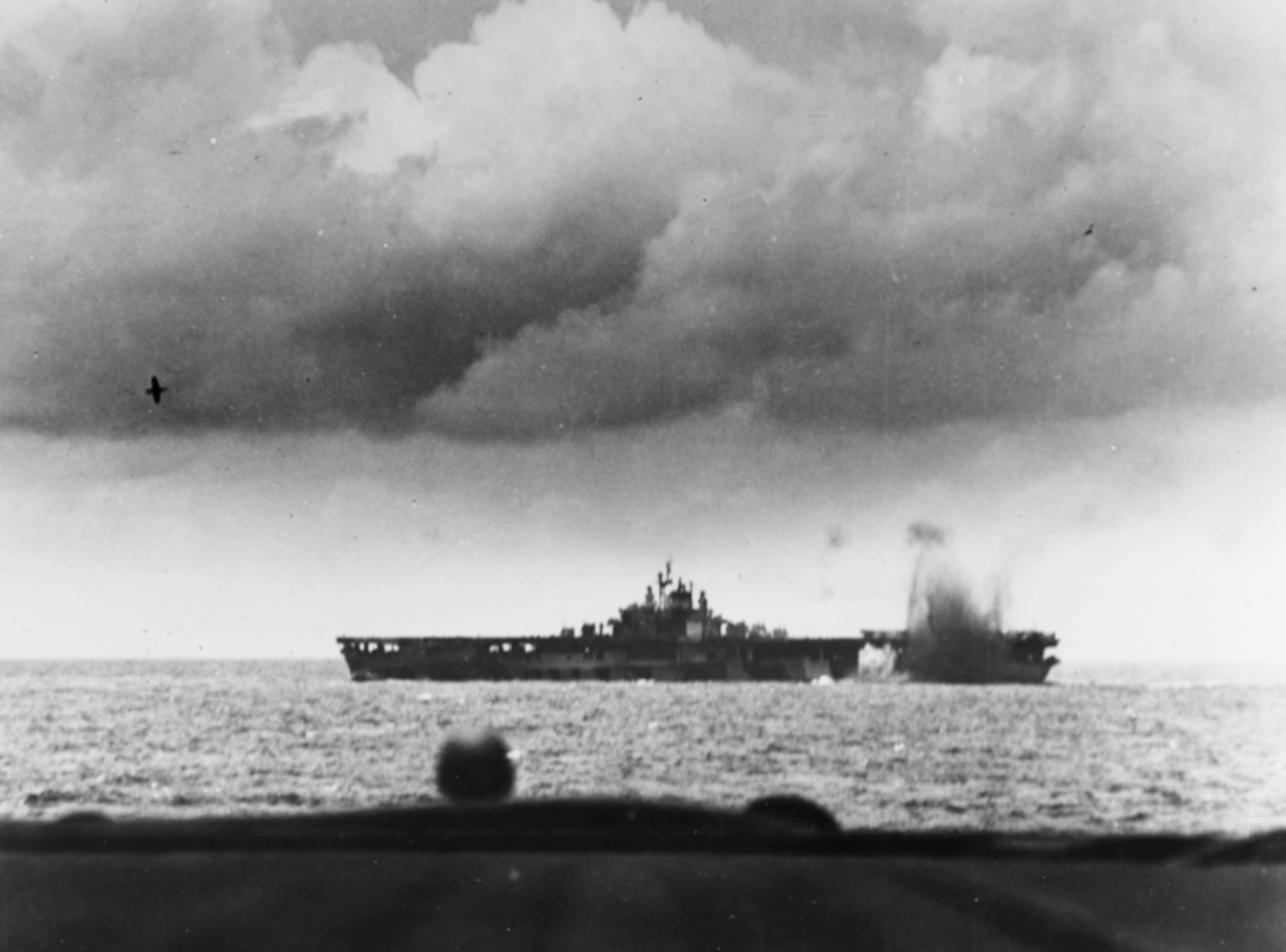
USS Bunker Hill is nearly hit by a Japanese bomb during the air attacks of 19 June 1944.

At 11:07, radar detected another, larger attack. This second wave consisted of 107 aircraft. They were met while still 60 miles (97 km) out, and at least 70 of these aircraft were shot down before reaching the ships. Six attacked Rear Admiral Alfred E. Montgomery's group, nearly hitting two of the carriers and causing casualties on each. Four of the six were shot down. A small group of torpedo aircraft attacked Enterprise, with one torpedo exploding in the wake of the ship. Three other torpedo aircraft attacked the light carrier Princeton and were shot down. In all, 97 of the 107 attacking aircraft were destroyed.

A third raid, consisting of 47 aircraft, came in from the north. It was intercepted by 40 fighters at 13:00, while 50 miles (80 km) out from the task force. Seven Japanese aircraft were shot down. A few broke through and made an ineffective attack on Task Group 58.4. Many others did not press home their attacks. This raid therefore suffered less than the others, and 40 of its aircraft managed to return to their carriers.

A fourth Japanese raid was launched between 11:00 and 11:30, but pilots had been given an incorrect position for the U.S. fleet and could not locate it. They broke into two loose groups and turned for Guam and Rota to refuel. One group flying toward Rota stumbled upon Montgomery's task group. Eighteen aircraft joined battle with American fighters and lost half their number. A smaller group of nine Japanese dive bombers of this force evaded U.S. aircraft and attacked Wasp and Bunker Hill but scored no hits; eight were shot down. The larger group of Japanese aircraft had flown to Guam and were intercepted over Orote Field by 27 Hellcats while landing. Thirty of the forty-nine Japanese aircraft were shot down, and the rest were damaged beyond repair. Aboard the Lexington afterward, a pilot was heard to remark "Hell, this is like an old-time turkey shoot!"

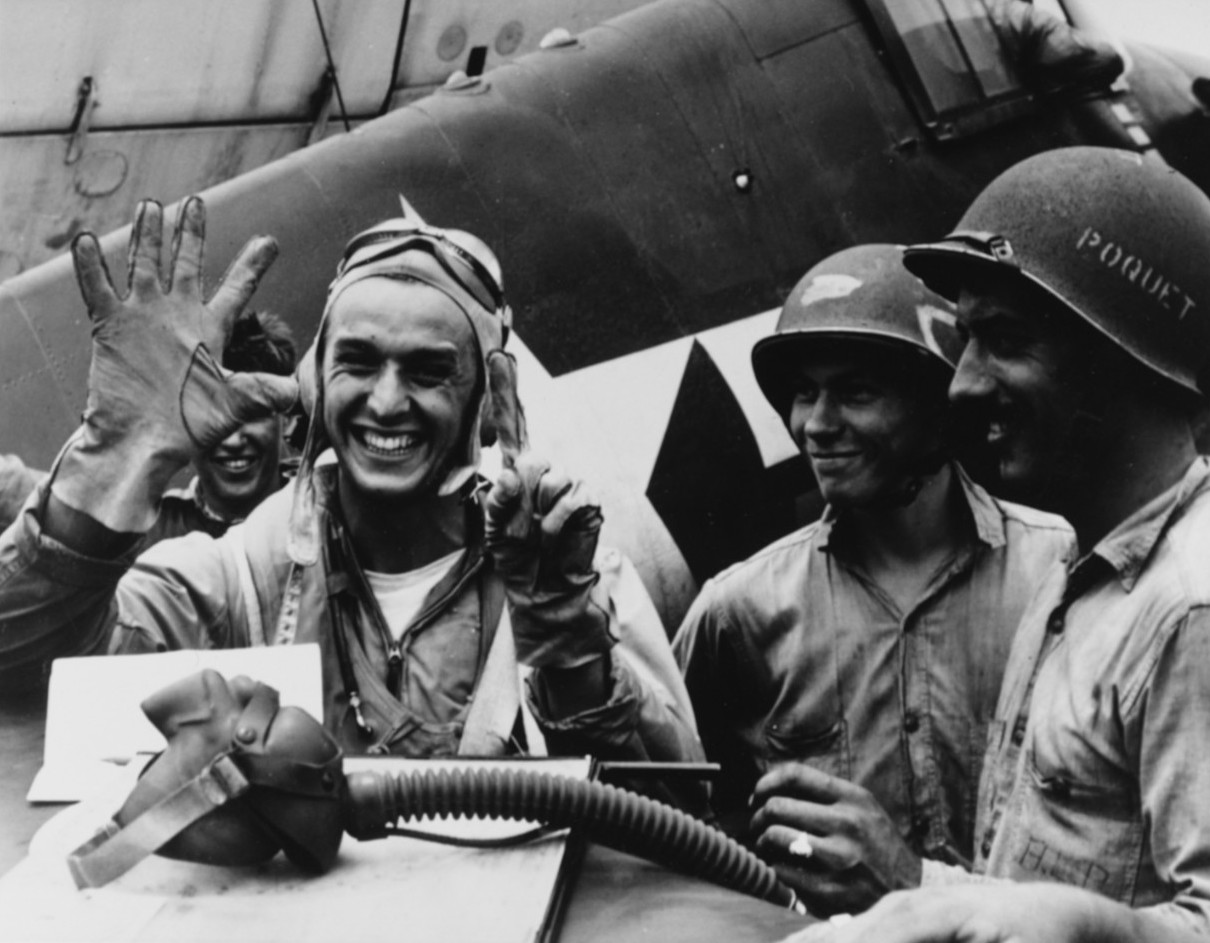
Lt. Alexander Vraciu downed six Japanese dive bombers in a single mission, 19 June 1944.

Including the continued aerial slaughter over Orote Field, Japanese losses exceeded 350 planes on the first day of battle. About 30 American planes were lost, and there was little damage to American ships; even the damaged South Dakota was able to remain in formation to continue her anti-aircraft duties.

=== Submarine attacks ===
Throughout the day, American scout aircraft had been unable to locate the Japanese fleet. However, two American submarines had already spotted Ozawa's carriers early that morning and were about to provide important assistance to the Fast Carrier Task Force.

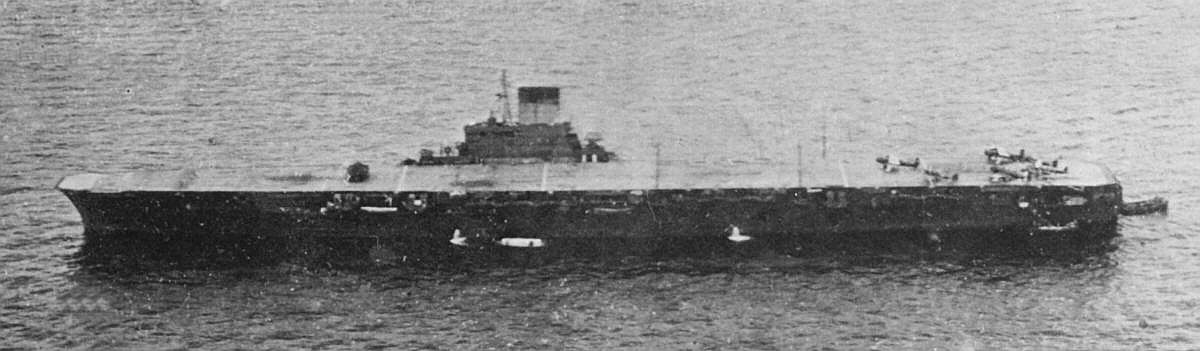
Japanese aircraft carrier Taihō

At 08:16 the submarine USS Albacore, which had sighted Ozawa's carrier group, had maneuvered into an ideal attack position; Lieutenant Commander James W. Blanchard selected the closest carrier as his target, which happened to be Taihō, the largest and newest carrier in the Japanese fleet and Ozawa's flagship. As Albacore was about to fire, however, her fire-control computer failed, and the torpedoes had to be fired "by eye". Determined to go ahead with the attack, Blanchard ordered all six torpedoes to be fired in a single spread to increase the chances of a hit.

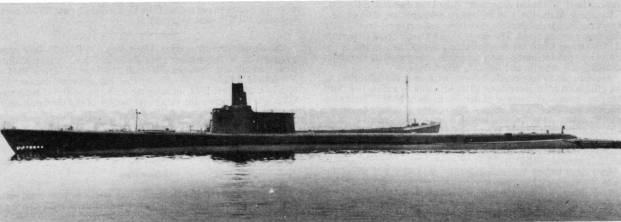
USS Albacore

Taihō had just launched 42 aircraft as a part of the second raid when Albacore fired the torpedo spread. Of the six torpedoes fired, four veered off-target. Japanese pilot Sakio Komatsu had recently launched and from his aircraft sighted one of the two torpedoes which were heading for Taihō. Komatsu dived into the path of the torpedo which then detonated. The sixth torpedo struck the carrier on her starboard side and ruptured two aviation fuel tanks. The carrier's escorting destroyers made depth charge attacks but caused only minor damage to Albacore. Initially, the damage to Taihō seemed minor; the flooding was quickly contained and the carrier's propulsion and navigation were unaffected. Taihō quickly resumed regular operations, but gasoline vapor from the ruptured fuel tanks began to fill the hangar decks, creating an increasingly dangerous situation on board.

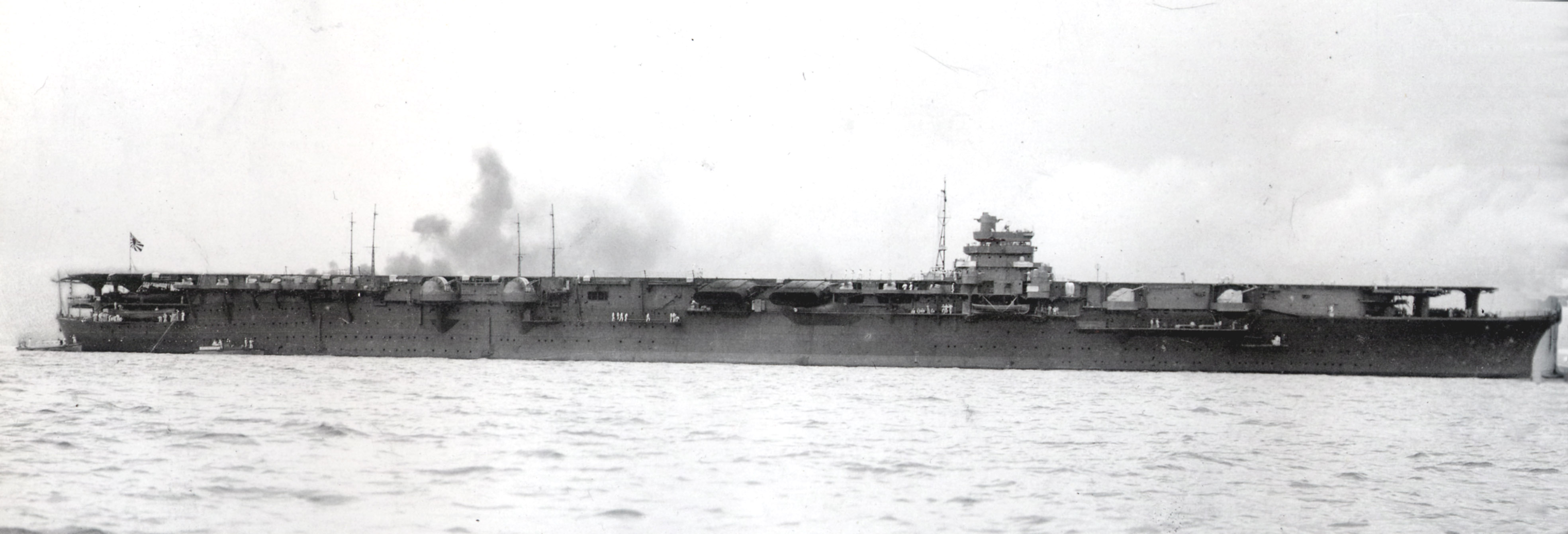
Japanese aircraft carrier Shōkaku

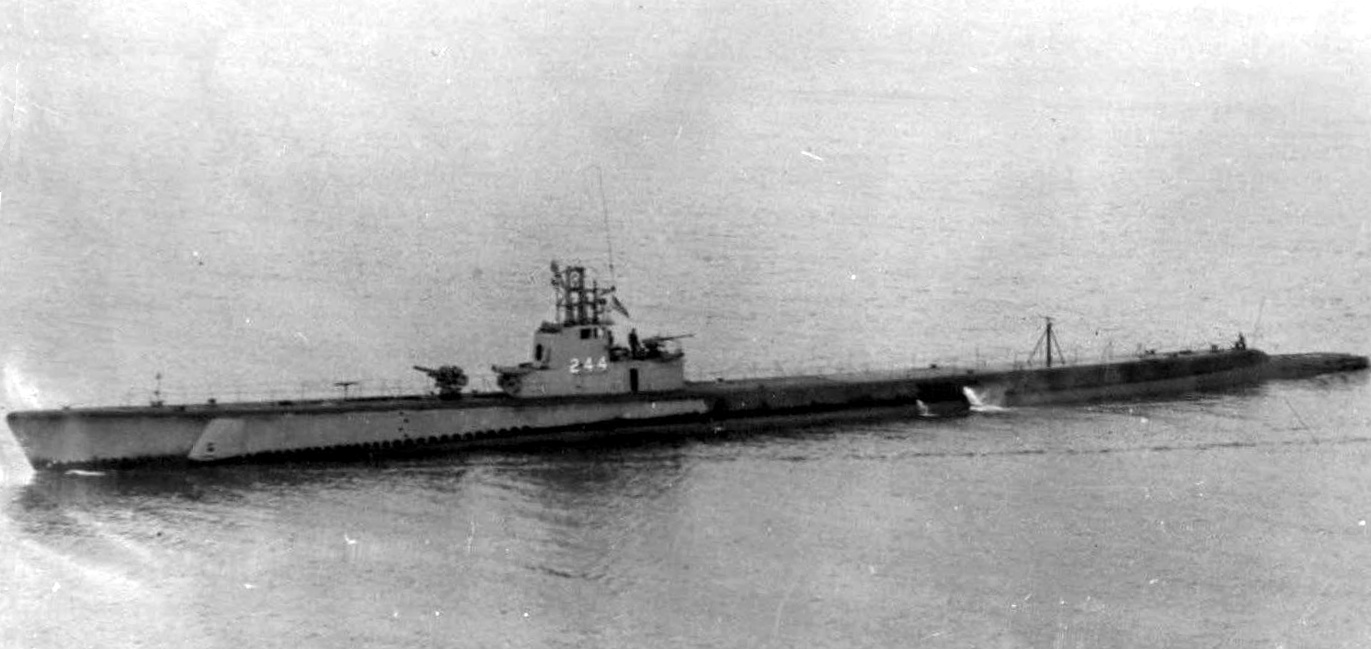
USS Cavalla

Another submarine, USS Cavalla, was able to maneuver to an attack position on the 25,675-ton carrier Shōkaku by about noon. The submarine fired a spread of six torpedoes, three of which struck Shōkaku on her starboard side. Badly damaged, the carrier came to a halt. One torpedo had hit the forward aviation fuel tanks near the main hangar, and aircraft that had just landed and were being refueled exploded into flames. Ammunition and exploding bombs added to the conflagration, as did burning fuel spewing from shattered fuel pipes. With her bows subsiding into the sea and fires out of control, the captain gave orders to abandon ship. Within minutes, there was a catastrophic explosion of aviation fuel vapor which had built up between decks, which blew the ship apart. The carrier rolled over and sank about 140 miles (230 km) north of the island of Yap. 887 crew and 376 men of the 601st Naval Air Group, 1,263 men in all, were killed. There were 570 survivors, including the carrier's commanding officer, Captain Hiroshi Matsubara. Destroyer Urakaze attacked the submarine, but Cavalla escaped with relatively minor damage despite near misses from depth charges.

Meanwhile, Taihō was falling victim to poor damage control. Hoping to clear the explosive fumes, an inexperienced damage-control officer ordered her ventilation system to operate at full blast. This action instead spread the vapors throughout Taihō, putting the entire vessel at risk. At approximately 14:30, a spark from an electric generator on the hangar deck ignited the accumulated fumes, triggering a series of catastrophic explosions. After the first explosions, it was clear that Taihō was doomed, and Ozawa and his staff transferred to the nearby destroyer Wakatsuki. Soon thereafter, Taihō suffered a second series of explosions and sank. From a crew of 2,150, 1,650 officers and men were lost.

=== U.S. counterattack ===
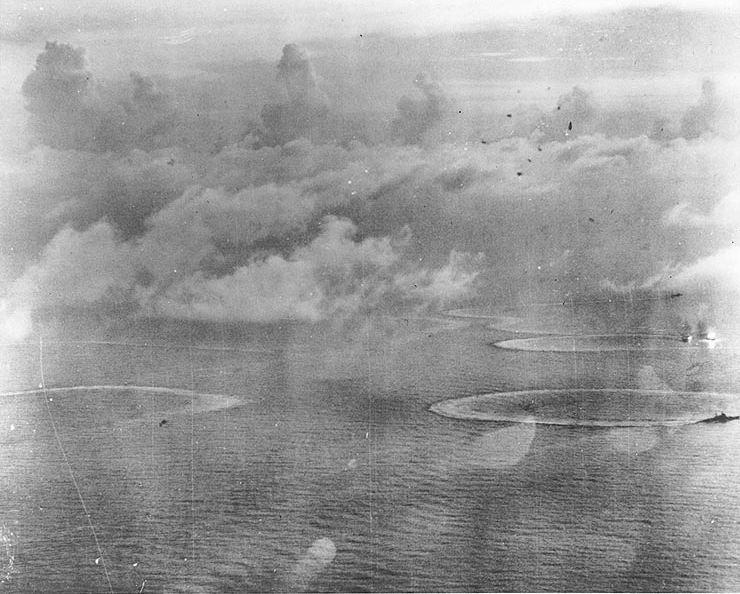
Japanese Carrier Division Three under attack by United States Navy aircraft from Task Force 58, late afternoon 20 June 1944. The heavy cruiser circling at right in the foreground is either Maya or Chōkai. Beyond that is Chiyoda.

TF 58 sailed west during the night to attack the Japanese at dawn. Search patrols were put up at first light.

Ozawa had transferred to the destroyer Wakatsuki, but the radio gear on board was incapable of sending the number of messages needed, so he transferred again, to the carrier Zuikaku, at 13:00. He then learned of the disastrous results of the previous day and that he had about 150 aircraft left. Nevertheless, he decided to continue the attacks, thinking there were still hundreds of aircraft on Guam and Rota and started planning new raids for 21 June.

The main problem for TF 58 was locating the enemy, who had been operating at a great distance. Early-morning American searches on 20 June found nothing. An extra mid-day search by Hellcat fighter pilots was also unsuccessful. Finally at 15:12 a garbled message from an Enterprise search plane indicated a sighting. At 15:40 the sighting was verified, along with distance, course, and speed. The Japanese fleet was 275 miles (443 km) out, moving due west at a speed of 20 knots. The Japanese were at the limit of TF 58's strike range, and daylight was slipping away. Mitscher decided to launch an all-out strike. After the first attack group had launched, a third message arrived, indicating the Japanese fleet were 60 miles (97 km) farther out than previously indicated. The first launch would be at their limits of fuel and would have to attempt landing at night. Mitscher canceled the second launch of aircraft but chose not to recall the first launch. Of the 240 planes that were launched for the strike, 14 aborted for various reasons and returned to their ships. The 226 planes that continued consisted of 95 Hellcat fighters (some carrying 500-pound bombs), 54 Avenger torpedo bombers (only a few carrying torpedoes, the rest four 500-pound bombs) and 77 dive bombers (51 Helldivers and 26 Dauntlesses). The TF 58 aircraft arrived over the Japanese fleet just before sunset.

The 35 or so fighters Ozawa was able to put up were overwhelmed by the 226 incoming aircraft of Mitscher's attack. While the few Japanese aircraft were often skillfully handled and the Japanese anti-aircraft fire was intense, the U.S. planes were able to press in on the attack.

The first ships sighted by the U.S. strike were oilers, 30 miles (48 km) before the carrier groups. The strike group from Wasp, more concerned with their low fuel levels than with finding the more important Japanese carriers and battleships, dived on the tankers. Two of these were damaged so severely that they were later scuttled, while a third was able to put out fires and get underway. The carrier Hiyō was attacked and hit by bombs and aerial torpedoes from four Grumman TBF Avengers from Belleau Wood. Hiyō was set afire after a tremendous blast from leaking aviation fuel. Dead in the water, she sank stern first, with the loss of 250 officers and men. The rest of her crew, about one thousand, were rescued by Japanese destroyers.

The carriers Zuikaku, Junyō and Chiyoda were damaged by bombs. Returning American strike pilots generally assessed these carriers as more crippled than they actually were, mistaking for devastating direct hits what Japanese post-war records revealed to have actually been huge geysers caused by near misses. The battleship Haruna was also hit by two bombs, including one directly on a main battery turret. Damage was contained, and she was able to keep station because her captain promptly called to flood the turret's magazine to avoid the possibility of an explosion.

Twenty American aircraft in the strike were destroyed by Japanese fighters and anti-aircraft fire that made up for a relative lack of accuracy with high volume of fire. After the protracted strike, it became clear that most of the aircraft returning to their carriers were running dangerously low on fuel, and to worsen matters, night had fallen. At 20:45, the first returning U.S. aircraft reached TF 58. Knowing his aviators would have difficulty finding their carriers, Admiral Joseph J. Clark of Hornet decided to illuminate his carrier, shining searchlights directly up into the night, despite the risk of attack from Japanese submarines and night-flying aircraft. Mitscher backed up the decision, and soon every ship in Task Force 58 was lit up, in spite of the risks involved. Picket destroyers fired starshells to help the aircraft find the task groups. (Note: It was a standing order from Commander-in-Chief Pacific (CINCPAC) that the ships must run dark after nightfall, and this decision to light up the Task Force was a direct violation of a command order.)

Planes were given clearance to land on any available flight deck (not just their home carriers, as usual), and many did land on other carriers. Despite this, 80 of the returning aircraft were lost. Some crashed on flight decks, but the majority ditched into the sea. Some pilots intentionally went down in groups to facilitate rescue, and more ditched individually either in a controlled landing with a few gallons of fuel left or in a crash after their engines ran dry. Approximately three-quarters of the crews were rescued from the sea, either that night from crash locations within the task forces, or over the next few days for those further out, as search planes and destroyers criss-crossed the ocean looking for them. (Note: The United States Navy customarily rewarded the crew of a ship that returned a downed pilot to his ship of origin with several gallons of ice cream.)

== Aftermath ==
=== Japanese ===
That night, Toyoda ordered Ozawa to withdraw from the Philippine Sea. U.S. forces gave chase, but the battle was over. The four Japanese air strikes involved 373 carrier aircraft, of which 243 were lost and 130 returned to the carriers; many of them were subsequently lost when Taiho and Shōkaku were sunk. After the second day of the battle, losses totaled three carriers, more than 350 carrier aircraft, and around 200 land-based aircraft.

In the five major "carrier-on-carrier" battles, from the Battle of the Coral Sea to the Battle of the Philippine Sea, the IJN had lost nine carriers, while the USN had lost three. The aircraft and trained pilots lost at Philippine Sea were an irreplaceable blow to the already outnumbered Japanese fleet air arm. The Japanese had spent the better part of a year (following the Battle of the Santa Cruz Islands) reconstituting their depleted carrier air groups, and the American Fast Carrier Task Force had destroyed 90% of it in two days. The Japanese had only enough pilots left to form the air group for one of their light carriers. As a consequence, during the Battle of Leyte Gulf four months later, they sent out a decoy carrier group with only 108 aircraft, across four carriers, that was sacrificed in an attempt to draw the American fleet away from protecting the troops and supplies being landed for the Battle of Leyte.

The Japanese military, which had hidden the extent of their previous losses from the Japanese public, continued this policy. Though the occurrence of the simultaneous Battle of the Philippine Sea and the Battle of Saipan were made known to the public, the extent of the disasters was withheld.

=== American ===
Losses on the U.S. side on the first day were 23 aircraft. The second day's airstrike against the Japanese fleet saw most of the aircraft losses for the U.S.; of the 226 aircraft launched on the strike, 115 returned; 20 were lost to enemy action in the attack, and 80 were lost when they ran out of fuel returning to their carriers and had to ditch into the sea, or crashed attempting to land at night.

Spruance's conservative battle plan for TF 58, while sinking just one light carrier, severely weakened the Japanese naval aviation forces by killing most of the remaining trained pilots and destroying their operational reserves of naval aircraft, a blow that effectively shattered the Japanese naval air arm, from which it never recovered. Without the time or resources to build sufficient aircraft and train new pilots, the surviving Japanese carriers were almost useless in an offensive role, a fact the Japanese acknowledged by using them as sacrificial decoys at Leyte Gulf. With the effective crippling of her best striking arm, Japan chose to rely increasingly on land-based kamikaze suicide aircraft in a last-ditch effort to make the war so costly that the U.S. would offer peace terms better than unconditional surrender.

Spruance was heavily criticized after the battle by many officers, particularly the aviators, for his decision to fight the battle cautiously rather than exploiting his superior forces and intelligence data with a more aggressive posture. By failing to close on the enemy earlier and more forcefully, his critics argue, he squandered an opportunity to destroy the entire Japanese Mobile Fleet. "This is what comes of placing a non-aviator in command over carriers" was the common refrain. Admiral John Towers, a naval aviation pioneer and Deputy Commander-in-Chief Pacific Fleet, demanded that Spruance be relieved. The request was denied by Nimitz. Moreover, Spruance was supported in his decision by Admiral Kelly Turner and Admiral Ernest King, Chief of Naval Operations.

Spruance's caution (in particular, his suspicion of a diversionary force) can be compared with Admiral William Halsey's headlong pursuit of an actual diversionary force at Leyte Gulf four months later. Halsey left the American invasion fleet weakly protected during the Battle off Samar, nearly resulting in a devastating attack on the landing force by Japanese heavy surface units. It was prevented only by the heroic and desperate attack of 5 small American surface ships, which put up such an intense fight that the 23-ship-strong Japanese fleet thought they were engaging a much larger force and withdrew. In addition, by focusing on defense first, the carrier forces under Spruance at Philippine Sea suffered no significant harm. This was in contrast to Leyte Gulf when Halsey's carriers were trying to neutralize the enemy airfields and attack the enemy fleet simultaneously, such that a Japanese bomber managed to evade the Combat Air Patrols to fatally cripple the light carrier USS Princeton. Likewise, during the carrier-based air raids, U.S. carriers were in a vulnerable position, and the low visibility coupled with radar confusion let a Japanese bomber slip through and severely damage USS Franklin.

Although the American carrier aircraft strikes caused less destruction to enemy naval vessels than earlier battles, American submarines made up for it by sinking two of the three Japanese fleet carriers, which left Zuikaku as the only remaining operational IJN fleet carrier.

The American F6F Hellcat fighter proved its worth, as its powerful engine generated superior speed, while its heavier armor and firepower made it rugged and deadly. The Japanese on the other hand were still flying the A6M Zero which, though highly maneuverable and revolutionary during the early stages of the Pacific War, was now underpowered, fragile and essentially obsolete by 1944. In addition, the D4Y "Judy", though fast, was also fragile and easily set on fire. Japanese naval airmen were also inadequately trained. The Japanese training programs could not replace the quality aviators lost during the past two years of the Pacific Campaign. Flying against the well-trained and often veteran U.S. aviators, it was a one-sided contest. The Americans lost fewer than two dozen Hellcats in air-to-air combat. Naval aviation and anti-aircraft fire shot down nearly 480 Japanese aircraft, 346 of those carrier aircraft on 19 June alone.

A very fortunate result of the Battle of the Philippine Sea for the Allies was it greatly benefited General MacArthur's invasion of Biak in Dutch New Guinea which started weeks before the Mariana Islands operations started. The Japanese military had designated Biak as its most important island of defense in the Southwest Pacific theater. 13 June was the original starting date of a massive operation, spearheaded by the battleships Yamato and Musashi, to challenge MacArthur's paltry naval forces, which had no aircraft carriers or battleships and consisted of only a few cruisers and destroyers. On that very same day Yamato and Musashi and their supporting ships received new orders to head north to screen aircraft carriers that were about to begin Operation A-Go. The battleships ultimately only provided anti-aircraft service in the Marianas operations.

== See also ==
- Philippine Sea order of battle
- United States Navy in World War II
- Imperial Japanese Navy in World War II
- Imperial Japanese Navy Air Service
- Z Plan (Japan)
- Naval Air Base Saipan
- World War II carrier-versus-carrier engagements between Allied and Japanese naval forces:
  - Battle of the Coral Sea
  - Battle of Midway
  - Battle of the Eastern Solomons
  - Battle of the Santa Cruz Islands
  - Battle off Cape Engaño
