= Allied bombing =

Allied Bombing may refer to:

- Triple Entente bombing, allied World War I bomber attacks against Germany
- Combined Bomber Offensive, several Anglo-American campaigns during World War II
  - Operation Gomorrah, a World War II mission in which the US and Great Britain bombed the same target during the day and at night
- Allied bombing of Germany
  - Allied bombing of Rotterdam in World War II
  - Allied bombing of Berlin in World War II
  - Round the Clock Bombing, a World War II episode of the Clash of Wings TV series regarding the Combined Bomber Offensive
- Battle of Britain, with World War II bombings by the German and Italian allies
- Invasion of Poland, with bombings by both Germany and when they joined the campaign, Russia
- Desert Storm, which included a coalition which bombed Iraq during the Gulf War
- Operation Unified Protector, with NATO bombing of Libya during the Arab Spring

== See also ==
- Allied bombing of Yugoslavia (disambiguation)
