= Triggers: Weapons That Changed the World =

- Starring: Wil Willis
- Country of origin: United States
- Original language: English
- No. of seasons: 2
- No. of episodes: 12

Original release
- Network: Military Channel (now American Heroes Channel)
- Release: November 30, 2011 – March 20, 2013

Triggers: Weapons That Changed the World is an American television series that premiered on November 30, 2011 on the Military Channel, which was rebranded as the American Heroes Channel in March 2014. The program features former United States Army Ranger, United States Air Force Pararescueman and star of Military's hit series Special Ops Mission Wil Willis.

In each episode, Willis tests a series of iconic weapons, from muskets and pistols to assault rifles and rocket-propelled grenades (RPGs), and examines their historical significance. The premiere episode looks at the evolution of the handgun, going back to its earliest days on 16th century battlefields.

Mike Tristano provided most of the weapons featured on the show. He is a fully licensed Master Armorer with over 25 years of experience and more than 400 film and television credits.

The first series was broadcast weekly in the UK on the Freeview channel Quest starting on Thursday 17 May 2012; the initial word of the title was dropped, giving the shorter form Weapons that Changed the World. The second series aired on the same channel commencing Tuesday 17 September 2013.

== Episodes ==
The subjects (not titles) of the episodes are listed below.

=== Season 1 ===
1. The M1911 and the evolution of the handgun
2. The M1 Garand and the evolution of the rifle
3. The Thompson and the evolution of the submachine gun
4. The M777 howitzer and the evolution of artillery
5. The AK-47 and the evolution of the assault rifle
6. The RPG and the evolution of man-portable rocket launchers

=== Season 2 ===
1. The M2 Browning "Ma Deuce" and the evolution of the machine gun
2. The Benelli M4 and the evolution of the shotgun
3. The GAU-19B and the evolution of the Gatling gun
4. The P226 family and the evolution of military pistols
5. The M1 Abrams and the evolution of the tank
6. The M249 SAW and the evolution of the light machine gun
