= Allied bombing of Yugoslavia =

Allied bombing of Yugoslavia may refer to:

- Allied bombing of Yugoslavia in World War II (1943–1944)
- NATO bombing of Yugoslavia (1999)

== See also ==
- Allied bombing (disambiguation)
