= Commanders at War =

- Genre: Documentary
- Countries of origin: United Kingdom; United States
- Original language: English
- No. of series: 1
- No. of episodes: 6

Production
- Running time: 60 minutes

Original release
- Release: February 9 – March 16, 2009

Commanders at War is a television show on the Military Channel (now American Heroes Channel). It highlights specific battles or skirmishes from World War II, where one commander is pitted against another. Using computer-generated imagery, many scenes are illustrated using cardboard-cutout-like figures to represent soldiers and equipment. Key battle decisions are examined, in order to explain the overall outcome of the battle.

== Episode list ==
=== "The Battle of Singapore" ===
Original Airdate: 2/9/2009

In 1941, the Gibraltar of the East was under attack by the Japanese. Despite the brave efforts of Lieutenant General Arthur Percival, Lieutenant General Tomoyuki Yamashita oversees the largest capitulation in British history.

Military Experts: Julian Thompson and Alistair Irwin

=== "The Battle of Midway" ===
Original Airdate: 2/16/2009

After the devastation of the attack on Pearl Harbor, the American Navy decoded Japanese communications regarding a planned attack on Midway Island. Heavily outnumbered, Rear Admiral Frank J. Fletcher had to prevent Vice Admiral Chūichi Nagumo from capturing this critical strategic position with inexperienced pilots and sailors against the battle-hardened Japanese war machine.

Military Experts: Andrew Lambert and Phillips O'Brien

=== "The Battle of El Alamein" ===
Original Airdate: 2/23/2009

After an undefeated record throughout North Africa, German Field Marshal Erwin Rommel has an opportunity to face off against a commander worthy of his skills: the new British commander, General Bernard Law Montgomery.

Military Experts: John Kiszely and Patrick Cordingley

=== "The Battle of Stalingrad" ===
Original Airdate: 3/2/2009

With the city that bears the name of nemesis, Joseph Stalin, in his sights, Hitler sent Field Marshal Friedrich Paulus to crush the city of Stalingrad. What he did not expect was the ferocious resistance offered by Lieutenant General Vasily Chuikov. What was supposed to be a battle lasting only a few weeks dragged to become one of the bloodiest battles in history.

Military Experts: Simon Mayall and Philip Sabin

=== "The Battle of Kursk" ===
Original Airdate: 3/09/2009

Germany and Russia clashed in 1943 near the Soviet city of Kursk, as control of the Eastern Front lay open. The Germans were led by Field Marshal Erich von Manstein, an aristocratic master tactician. Across the battlefield was Red Army Marshal Georgy Zhukov, a peasant born street brawler.

Military Experts: Simon Mayall and Philip Sabin

=== "The Battle of the Bulge" ===
Original Airdate: 3/16/2009

In 1944, the end of Hitler's Third Reich was near and Berlin was in sight. In a desperate attempt, Hitler conceived of a bold new offensive to strike the Allies through the Ardennes Forest, pitting General Omar Bradley and Field Marshal Walter Model.

Military Experts: Julian Thompson and Sebastian Roberts
