= Special Ops Mission =

- Created by: Bob Niemack
- Starring: Wil Willis
- Country of origin: United States
- Original language: English
- No. of seasons: 1
- No. of episodes: 6

Production
- Running time: 42 minutes

Original release
- Network: American Heroes Channel
- Release: August 13 – September 17, 2009

Special Ops Mission is an American reality television series that premiered on August 13, 2009 on the Military Channel (now American Heroes Channel). The program features former United States Army Ranger and Air Force Pararescueman Wil Willis, who performs solo special operations missions against groups of opposing-force (OPFOR) operatives, which consists of regular and special operations veterans in a simulated wargame mission.

== Plot ==
At the beginning of each episode, Wil Willis, call sign Whiskey Whiskey, is given information on a specific special operations mission by U.S. Marine Corps Master Sergeant Tom Minder or U.S. Army Sergeant Matt Anderson, which he must complete solo. It is Willis' call as to how he wishes to infiltrate, collect intelligence, complete objectives, and how he will deal with the OPFOR (opposing force). The OPFOR are then introduced, with backgrounds and call signs given. Both parties separately discuss plans, though neither side is told how many enemies they will face. Equipment and weapons are introduced, which typically consists of M4 carbines and M16 rifles loaded with Simunition rounds. It is predetermined that a simulated hit to the torso is a kill shot, while a hit to an extremity only wounds.

Willis also carries a variety of other equipment to cover mission variables such as environment (weather and terrain), expected resistance, and infiltration/exfiltration plans. Digital cameras for intelligence gathering, a remote-controlled 2 wheeled surveillance robot equipped with a night vision camera for scouting ahead, and body armor are just some examples of what he uses. Likewise, the OPFOR may have access to special equipment of their own, such as motor vehicles, various grenades, and early detection gear.

== Episodes ==
| No. | Title | Original release date |
|---|---|---|
| 1 | "Operation Urban Terror" | August 13, 2009 |
Insurgents have taken over a large building and are using it to hold hostages. Willis' mission is to infiltrate the insurgent stronghold, interrupt the flow of illicit money and weapons, and rescue the hostages from the insurgents. Friendly force: Wil Willis: Escaped; Hostages: Escaped OPFOR: Tango 1 - Charlie Parrish - U.S. Army: Eliminated; Tango 2 - Chase Rivera - U.S. Marine Corps; Tango 3 - Lowel Muenchau - U.S. Marine Corps: Eliminated; Tango 4 - Colin Palmer - U.S. Navy SEALs: Eliminated Objectives: Infiltrate building: Completed; Intercept weapons shipment: Failed; Liberate hostages: Completed; Exfiltrate: Completed
| 2 | "Operation Frozen Thunder" | August 20, 2009 |
Terrorists have dammed up the local water supply, and are hijacking deliveries of humanitarian aid intended for a refugee camp down-river. Willis' mission is to trek through the snow and blow up the dam that is preventing water from flowing to the refugee camp. Friendly force: Wil Willis: Eliminated; Hostage: Escaped OPFOR: Raven 1 - Charlie Parrish - U.S. Army: Eliminated; Raven 2 - Kicker - U.S. Marine Corps; Raven 3 - Chris "Mojo" Merkle - U.S. Marine Corps: Eliminated; Raven 4 - Nick Lattu - U.S. Army: Eliminated Objectives: Recon camp: Completed; Destroy the dam: Completed; Destroy communications system: Completed; Destroy the water tower: Complete; Liberate hostages: Completed; Exfiltrate: Failed
| 3 | "Operation Covert Canyon" | August 27, 2009 |
A rebel force is acquiring weapons of mass destruction. Their camp is protected by five operators. Willis' mission is to infiltrate the camp, document the weapons, and upload the photographs to Central Command. Friendly force: Wil Willis: Escaped OPFOR: Tommy 1 - Michael Lee - U.S. Marine Corps; Tommy 2 - John Beltran - U.S. Navy SEALs; Tommy 3 - Jason Kyle - U.S. Marine Corps; Tommy 4 - Rich McDonough - U.S. Navy: Eliminated; Tommy 5 - Charlie Parrish - U.S. Army: Eliminated Objectives: Infiltrate rebel camp: Completed; Document the existence of WMD: Completed; Document the delivery of WMD: Completed; Remove guidance system from weapon: Incomplete; Exfiltrate: Completed
| 4 | "Operation Pirate Guns" | September 3, 2009 |
Pirates have captured a Merchant Marine gunship. Aerial intelligence shows shipments of nuclear material being loaded onto the ship. Willis' mission is to infiltrate the ship and determine the pirate's target. Friendly force: Wil Willis: Escaped; Hostage scientists: Eliminated OPFOR: Skinny 1 - Chris Withrow - U.S. Navy SEALs; Skinny 2 - Steffond Johnson - U.S. Marine Corps: Eliminated; Skinny 3 - Carlos Moreno - U.S. Marine Corps; Skinny 4 - Jen X - U.S. Army Objectives: Board the ship: Completed; Destroy the deck guns: Completed; Disable the ship: Completed; Recon the navigation charts: Completed; Rescue the scientists: Failed; Exfiltrate: Completed
| 5 | "Operation Freebird Down" | September 10, 2009 |
A force antagonistic to the government has set up anti-aircraft systems. Willis' mission is to take direct action against the radar and communication systems that allow the OPFOR to track and engage friendly aircraft. Friendly force: Wil Willis: Escaped; Badger 1-1 (Pilot) - Justin Shook - U.S. Air Force: Escaped OPFOR: Dave Thomas - U.S. Army: Eliminated; Alan Tafoya - Law enforcement: Eliminated; Randle Ross - U.S. Army: Eliminated; Steven Watanabe - U.S. Army: Wounded Objectives: Infiltrate enemy area of operations: Completed; Destroy the communications tower: Completed; Destroy the mobile radar unit: Incomplete; Rescue the downed pilot: Completed; Destroy the dirty bomb: Completed; Neutralize/capture Stinger Missile Launcher: Completed; Exfiltrate: Completed
| 6 | "Operation One Shot" | September 17, 2009 |
A drug lord is visiting a military training camp in order to observe its operations and see weapons demonstrations. Willis is sent to infiltrate the camp, positively identify the drug lord, and eliminate him. Friendly force: Wil Willis: Escaped OPFOR: Chase Rivera - U.S. Marine Corps; Brian Sargent - U.S. Marine Corps; Rob Kaneiss - U.S. Navy SEALs; Michael Pich - U.S. Marine Corps; Jason Neumann - U.S. Army; Eric Stinson - Law enforcement; Rex - Police dog Objectives: Infiltrate enemy area of operations: Completed; Confirm ability to make weapons: Completed; Photograph drug lord: Completed; Assassinate drug lord: Completed; Exfiltrate: Completed

== Reviews ==
Mike Hale of The New York Times offers suspicion regarding the realism of the program. Viewer response, on the other hand, has been primarily positive, and as of October 2009 the show had an average rating of 5/5 on the iTunes Store.
