= Weapons Races =

Weapons Races is a military television documentary series examining the development of various new military technologies and how their evolution impacted tactics and strategies used in warfare since the High Middle Ages, but focused mainly on film since World War I. It is an eight-part series exposing the most significant weapons races to transform modern warfare, from the original concepts that overturned military thinking to the most advanced versions of each weapon in service today. Whether it is a new idea such as radar, or a series of breakthroughs producing a dramatic new weapon like the jet fighter, in each case it shows that enemies have to react with their own countermeasures - creating a competitive arms race.

The series is shown on the Military Channel (now AHC) in the U.S. and UKTV History.

Each episode looks at particular military development – or "race" – through a succession of historical developments and the responses by the various rivals of the day, displaying them against the ideal requirements necessary to engineer the new technology successfully. All eight episodes use mixed examples where applicable with such mentions like the Revolutionary submarine Turtle and the CSS Hunley, but most mentions and examples are from modern warfare where ample film archives exist, dating mainly from the First World War (1914–18) up to the recent Iraq War (2003). A varying panel of military or military history experts provide commentary and highlight key developments including Lloyd Clark (Royal Military Academy Sandhurst) and Bruce Gudmundsson (US Army War College). These panelists analyze the information and talk about it on the show.

== Episodes ==
Eight 50 minute episodes, each a different weapon, each has SUBTITLES.

1. THE RACE FOR THE JET FIGHTER - First dogfight to the F-22 Raptor (U.S.)
2. THE RACE FOR THE BATTLE TANK - 1916 WWI trenches & Brit. Mark 1 to U.S. M1A2 Abrams
3. THE RACE FOR RADAR AND STEALTH - WWII Brit. break, to Powers' U-2, to U.S. stealth F-117 Nighthawk
4. THE RACE FOR THE NUCLEAR BOMB - 1945 U.S. 'Little Boy' on Hiroshima to modern U.S. W-80 Tomahawk cruise
5. THE RACE FOR THE STRATEGIC BOMBER - 1915 Ger. Zeppelins bomb London to U.S. B-2 Spirit bomber
6. THE RACE FOR THE STRATEGIC BALLISTIC MISSILE - 1944 Ger. V-2 rocket London hits to U.S. Trident sub-launched missile
7. THE RACE FOR THE NUCLEAR SUBMARINE - 1954s nuclear-power USS Nautilus to 2005 U.S. nuke attack sub 'Virginia'
8. THE RACE FOR THE AIRCRAFT CARRIER - 1918 Brit HMS Argus to 2006 U.S. Geo. Herbert Walker Bush, mobile airfield

== DVD release ==
The Region 1 DVD collection of three discs was released June 21, 2011. It has a listed running time of 400 minutes. The Amazon Standard Identification Number is ASIN: B004SI5VV8.
