= American Heroes Channel =

U.S. cable television channel

- Country: United States; Canada
- Broadcast area: Nationwide (USA); Canada
- Headquarters: Elizabeth, New Jersey

Programming
- Language: English
- Picture format: 1080i HDTV (downscaled to letterboxed 480i for the SDTV feed)

Ownership
- Owner: Skydance Corporation
- Parent: Skydance Television
- Sister channels: see list of assets owned by Skydance Corporation

History
- Launched: July 15, 1998; 28 years ago
- Former names: Discovery Wings Channel (1998–2005); Military Channel (2005–14)

Links
- Website: www.ahctv.com

Availability

American Heroes Channel (formerly Military Channel and originally Discovery Wings Channel) is an American multinational pay television channel owned by the Skydance Television unit of Skydance Corporation. The network carries programs related to the military, warfare, and military history and science.

As of November 2023, AHC is available to approximately 28,000,000 pay television households in the United States-down from its 2014 peak of 62,000,000 households. Along with Boomerang, Cooking Channel, Destination America, Discovery Family, Discovery Life, and Science Channel, American Heroes Channel is among the less prevalent networks of Warner Bros. Discovery.

In recent years, AHC has lost carriage with the growth of streaming alternatives including its parent company's HBO Max, and has generally been depreciated by Warner Bros. Discovery in current retransmission consent negotiations with cable and streaming providers.

== Background ==
The channel launched in July 1998, as Discovery Wings Channel; it originally focused on programs relating to aircraft and aerospace. During its early years, the network also aired a weather segment near the top of each hour featuring aviation forecast data from the National Weather Service. Discovery Wings Channel became available to television providers in Canada starting on September 7, 2001.

Discovery Communications filed a trademark application with the United States Copyright Office for the use of the name "Military Channel" in 2002, after the trademark was abandoned by an unrelated start-up cable network based in Louisville, Kentucky, also named The Military Channel, which went dark in 1999 and later went bankrupt. That network – which focused on the heroes, history and hardware of the international military scene – experienced difficulty raising capital, despite early success.

Logo as Military Channel, used from January 10, 2005 to March 2, 2014

On January 10, 2005, the network was rebranded as the Military Channel. Carrying over from its original format, many of the network's programs as the Military Channel were dedicated to aerial warfare and related technologies and issues. In 2005, the channel aired its first live program from Philadelphia at the site of the Army–Navy college football game, two hours before that game's kickoff, in which Fox Sports commentator Chris Myers hosted from a set outside of Lincoln Financial Field.

On March 3, 2014, the channel was rebranded as American Heroes Channel, with the intent to "provide more history based, narrative-style documentary programming." The network is a sponsor of the United Service Organizations (USO) and frequently runs commercials for that organization.

== Programming ==
Many of the programs featured on American Heroes Channel are war documentaries, the contents of which deal in large part with modern warfare, and in particular the U.S. military from World War II onward. While the A+E Networks-owned History, Military History and H2 air similar programming, those networks tend to show more programs about other time periods and cultures (ancient, Roman, Medieval, Eastern, and other forms of warfare). AHC has a more contemporary subject matter than those competitors, but it occasionally presents historical programming as well. Actor Dennis Haysbert serves as the network's continuity announcer for its on-air promotions.

In addition, the channel also presents feature films with a military theme (usually within the hosted movie series An Officer and a Movie, which is hosted by Lou Diamond Phillips), as well as individual episodes of other shows (such as Belly of the Beast, Build It Bigger, Extreme Machines, Timewatch and Unsolved History), which incorporate military-related content. These are often shows that were produced for other Discovery Communications-owned channels.

=== List of programs ===
==== Current programs ====
- Against the Odds
- America: Facts vs. Fiction
- American Lawmen
- American Titans
- Ancient Assassins
- Blood and Fury: America's Civil War
- Blood Feuds
- Chasing Conspiracies
- Codes and Conspiracies
- Cold War Armageddon
- Egypt's Greatest Mysteries
- Forbidden History
- Gunslingers
- Hitler
- How the World Ends
- Inside Secret Societies
- Mafia's Greatest Hits
- Mafia's Most Wanted
- Manhunt: Kill or Capture
- Nazi Death Squad
- Nazi Fugitives
- Nazi Secret Files
- Origins
- UFO's The Lost Evidence
- War Stories
- What History Forgot
- WWII Confidential
- WWII: Witness to War

==== Former programming ====
- 20th Century Battlefields
- 9/11 As We Watched
- Age of Aerospace
- America's Most Badass
- The American Revolution
- Anatomy Of ...
- Apocalypse: Hitler
- Apocalypse: Stalin
- Apocalypse: WWI
- At Sea
- Auschwitz: Hitler's Final Solution
- BBC Airport
- Battle of the Atlantic
- Battleplan
- Black Ops
- Clash of Wings
- The Color of War
- Combat Countdown
- Combat Tech
- Combat Zone
- Commanders at War
- Edge of War
- Escape to the Legion
- Evolution of Evil
- Firepower
- First Command
- The First World War
- Future Weapons
- G.I. Factory
- Greatest Tank Battles
- Great Planes
- The Greatest Ever
- Heroes and Villains
- Heroes of World War II
- Hitler's Bodyguard
- How We Got Here
- Mission Demolition
- Missions that Changed the War
- Modern Sniper
- Narrow Escapes of World War II
- Natural Born Outlaws
- Navy SEALs: Untold Stories
- Nazi Collaborators
- Normandy: The Great Crusade
- Officer and a Movie
- Project Nazi: The Blueprints of Evil
- Quest for Sunken Warships
- The Secret War
- Secrets of World War II
- Showdown: Air Combat
- Special Ops Mission
- Special Forces: Untold Stories
- Stealth Secrets
- Surviving the Cut
- Tank Overhaul
- Top Sniper
- Top Ten
- Toughest Military Jobs
- Triggers: Weapons That Changed the World
- Ultimate Weapons
- War Stories
- Warrior POV
- Weapon Masters
- Weaponology
- Weaponizers
- Weapons Races
- Weapons of World War II
- Wings of the Luftwaffe
- Wings Over Vietnam
- World at War
- World's Deadliest Aircraft
- World War I in Colour
- World War II In HD Colour
- World War II Confidential

Some programs are available to stream on Max.
