= Clash of Wings =

1998 documentary television series

Clash of Wings is a 15-episode documentary television series which originally aired in 1998 on the Discovery Channel. The hour-long episodes were some of the initial shows of Discovery Network's 1999 launch of the Discovery Wings and later the 2005 launch of the Military Channel. Based on the Clash of Wings (1994) reference book by air historian Walter J. Boyne, the programs were produced in 1998 and aired the next year appearing as some of the initial original content in the launch of the new Discovery Wings cable channel (before its name change in 2005 to the Military Channel). The programs were hosted and partially narrated and written by Boyne, (also credited as associate producer) together with director-producer John Honey, and presented by executive producer Phillip Osborn. The effort adapted his encyclopedic work of the same name.

Like many World War II documentaries involving aircraft, the displayed content uses many scenes from gun camera footage and other military films now in the public domain. The series also interspersed color film of surviving combat aircraft types from multiple camera angles and in a variety of operations modes. Unlike many documentaries about the era, the series makes no effort to present on-camera interviews, instead focusing on an overarching narrative appropriate to that episode's specific title. Boyne is not the sole narrator, but uses multiple narrators to describe details while Boyne ties the segments together as host.

== Series scope ==
The first air attack of World War II officially commenced at 04:34 hours on September 1, 1939, when three Luftwaffe Ju 87 Stukas attacked railway bridges in Poland. The air war effectively ended at 10:58 hours on August 9, 1945, when a solitary B-29 Superfortress over the Japanese city of Nagasaki dropped the second atomic bomb. The Stukas carried 250 kg bombs: the A-bomb dropped by the B-29 was equivalent to 23,000 tons of TNT and couldn't have been lifted by any plane besides the B-29s.

Based on the international bestselling book by Walter Boyne, director of the Smithsonian's Air and Space Museum, the Clash of Wings series covers the air war in every theatre from 1939 to 1945.

== List of episodes ==
The series ran one season, with frequent repeats at other times. It currently airs from time to time on the Military Channel.

=== "The Bluff is Called" ===
Blitzkrieg: World War II is declared and Hitler's Luftwaffe employs revolutionary new aircraft and tactics in the Blitzkrieg attacks on Poland and Scandinavia that preceded the German ground invasions. Aircraft featured: Junkers Ju 87B, Hawker Hurricane, the Supermarine Spitfire, Messerschmitt Bf 109, Messerschmitt Bf 110, Heinkel He 111, Junkers Ju 52 and Dornier Do 17.

=== The Plunge into Reality ===
The Battles of France and Britain: New fighting techniques using newly developed aircraft were unleashed over Britain and France by both the Allies and the Axis and would provide a glimpse at the speed and efficiency of what was to come throughout the rest of World War II. Aircraft featured: Hawker Hurricane, Supermarine Spitfire, Messerschmitt Bf 109, Messerschmitt Bf 110, Junkers Ju 88, Heinkel He 111, Dornier Do 17, Dornier Do 217, Junkers Ju 87, Bristol Blenheim, Fairey Battle and Junkers Ju 52.

=== Hitler's Biggest Gamble ===
The Russian Front: Operation Barbarossa and Germany's failure to bring a quick resolution to that particular campaign was arguably the turning point of the war in Europe. Aircraft featured: Polikarpov I-153, Tupolev SB-2, Il-2, PE-2, Bf 109F/G, Ju 88, Ju 87, Ju 52/3m, Yak-9, Po-2 and P-39 Airacobra.

=== Wings of the Rising Sun ===
The Pacific War: The air war in the Pacific is launched commencing with a surprise attack on Pearl Harbor. This campaign saw the involvement of carrier-based aerial warfare with great battles raging between the aircraft carriers of Japan and the United States. Aircraft featured: Mitsubishi A6M Zero, G4M Betty and G3M Type 96 Bomber, Aichi D3A Val, Douglas SBD Dauntless, B-25 Mitchell, P-40, F4F Wildcat, F6F Hellcat, F4U Corsair and PBY Catalina.

=== The African Tutorial ===
The Mediterranean Theatre: Britain faced Germany and its Italian allies in the battle for supremacy over the Mediterranean and Northern Africa. American airmen later joined the British in their struggle for Europe. Aircraft featured: P-40E, CR.42 Falco, G.50 Frecchia, Fiat G.55, Folgore, Hurricane, Wellington, Swordfish, Ju 87 Stuka, Bf 109, P-38 Lightning, P-39 Airacobra and B-25 Mitchell.

=== Germany's Third and Last Chance ===
Battle of the Atlantic: The 3–4-year-long Battle of the Atlantic very nearly brought Britain to her knees and proved to be one of the most crucial extended campaigns of the war. This is the first of two programs detailing this desperate maritime war. Deadly weapons and auxiliary systems including RDF and H2S maritime search radar were developed to combat the German U Boat menace. Aircraft featured: Fairey Swordfish, Focke-Wulf Condor, Short Sunderland, Lockheed Hudson, Consolidated PBY Catalina, Consolidated B-24 Liberator, Heinkel He 111 and Dornier Do 217.

=== The Biggest Battleground ===
The War in the Pacific Islands: The Pacific War with Japan reached a crucial turning point with the Battles of Guadalcanal and New Guinea. Japanese expansion in the Pacific region was halted for the first time and the tide slowly began to turn. Aircraft featured: Hellcat, Wildcat, Corsair, Zero, G4M Betty, D3A Val, P-40, Dauntless, Avenger, P-38, B-17 and C-47 Skytrain (Dakota).

=== The Cost of Incompetence ===
The Allied Dominance in the Pacific: America and the Allied forces set their sites on the home islands of Japan and in doing so liberated much of the Japanese-held Pacific. Japan, however struck back with a terrifying new weapon: the Kamikaze attack. Aircraft featured: Hellcat, B-17, B-24, B-25, P-38, P-47, C-47, F-4 Reporter, P-39, P-40, Corsair, Helldiver, Zero, Avenger and B-29.

=== Round the Clock Bombing ===
The Allied Bombing Campaign of Germany: After Britain's somewhat faltered start to the bombing campaign of Germany in 1940 and the entry of the United States into the war the allies quickly developed precision area bombing into a highly effective assault with incredibly devastating results. Aircraft featured: B-17, Wellington, Hampden, Whitley, Stirling, Halifax, Lancaster, Bf 109, Fw 190 and Bf 110.

=== Air Superiority Lost and Won ===
Allied Might versus German Technology: The combined day and night bombing of German cities was chiefly responsible for turning the tide of the air war against Germany. Germany's response was a case of too little too late with the development of a highly sophisticated night fighter force and the introduction of Jet and Rocket powered fighters. Aircraft featured: P-38 Lightning, Mosquito, He 219 Owl, Lancaster, P-51 Mustang, Bf 110, Typhoon, Me 262, Arado Ar 234 and Me 163.

=== True Airpower ===
Firebombing of Japan and the Atomic Bomb: In 1944, the major cities of Japan were targeted in a firebombing campaign that would climax with the dropping of the atomic bomb and days later, the surrender of the Japanese. Aircraft featured: B-26 Marauder, B-29 Superfortress and P-51 Mustang.

=== The Fighters ===
The Evolution of the Fighter in World War II: The World War II period saw the development of the fighter aircraft from the biplane through to the introduction of the first jet fighter aircraft. Aircraft featured in this volume include the Mustang, Spitfire, Hurricane, Bf 109, Bf 110, P-40, P-38 and A6M Zero.

=== The Bombers ===
The Evolution of the Bomber in World War II: Never before had the bomber been needed and used so effectively than in World War II. Its necessity brought forward its evolution from simple twin-engined medium bombers through to the four engined radar equipped super bombers like the B-29 Superfortress and Lancaster. Aircraft featured in this volume include the Lancaster, Mosquito, Wellington, B-17, B-24, B-25, B-26, He 111, Do 17, Ju 88, Val, Kate and Betty.

=== Return to the Pacific ===
Focuses on the role of air support in the allied roll back and advances against the multiple layered Japanese defenses in the Pacific Oceans. Surveys the Pacific War in the Central and Southwest Pacific Ocean theaters, with brief mentions of land combat and major focus on air contributions to reducing Imperial Japanese control of land and sea.

=== Battle Over the Sea ===
Surveys air power as it impacted the desperate Battle of the Atlantic against the World War II U-boat threat and the War in the Pacific Theatres. Land-based bombers include Lancaster and B-24 long-range bomber patrols, development and deployment of airborne radar systems and Radio Direction Finding electronic warfare developments, and the advent of the Escort Carrier.
