= Floyd Parks =

Floyd Parks may refer to:

- Floyd B. Parks (1911–1942), United States Marine Corps fighter pilot during World War II
- Floyd Lavinius Parks (1896–1959), United States Army lieutenant general
