= Dean Caswell =

American flying ace (1922–2022)

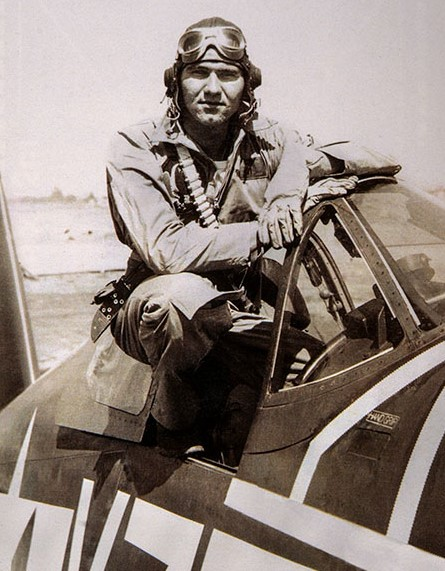
- Caswell in 1945
- Born: July 24, 1922; Banning, California, U.S.
- Died: September 21, 2022 (aged 100); Austin, Texas, U.S.
- Burial place: Cook Walden Forest Oaks Memorial Park; Austin, Texas, U.S.
- Military career
- Allegiance: United States
- Branch: United States Marine Corps
- Service years: 1942–1968
- Rank: Colonel
- Units: VMF-221; VMF(N)-513; VMC-1
- Conflicts: World War II; Korean War
- Awards: Silver Star; Distinguished Flying Cross (2); Air Medal (5)

Dean Caswell (July 24, 1922 – September 21, 2022) was a United States Marine Corps flying ace during World War II. He accrued seven victories in the war. He retired from military service in 1968 at the rank of colonel. He was the last living Marine Corps flying ace of World War II.

== Early life ==
Caswell was born on July 24, 1922, in Banning, California. The family moved to Edinburg, Texas, that year. He was a member of the Boy Scouts, where he earned the Aviation merit badge after building a model airplane. He grew up during the Great Depression and had to work in a series of jobs on ranches. He attended Edinburg Junior College prior to joining the United States Marine Corps in September 1942.

== Military career ==
In September 1942, Caswell enlisted in the Aviation Cadet Program of the U.S. Navy, and was commissioned a second lieutenant in the U.S. Marine Corps and on December 16, 1943, he received his Wings of Gold at NAS Pensacola.

=== World War II ===
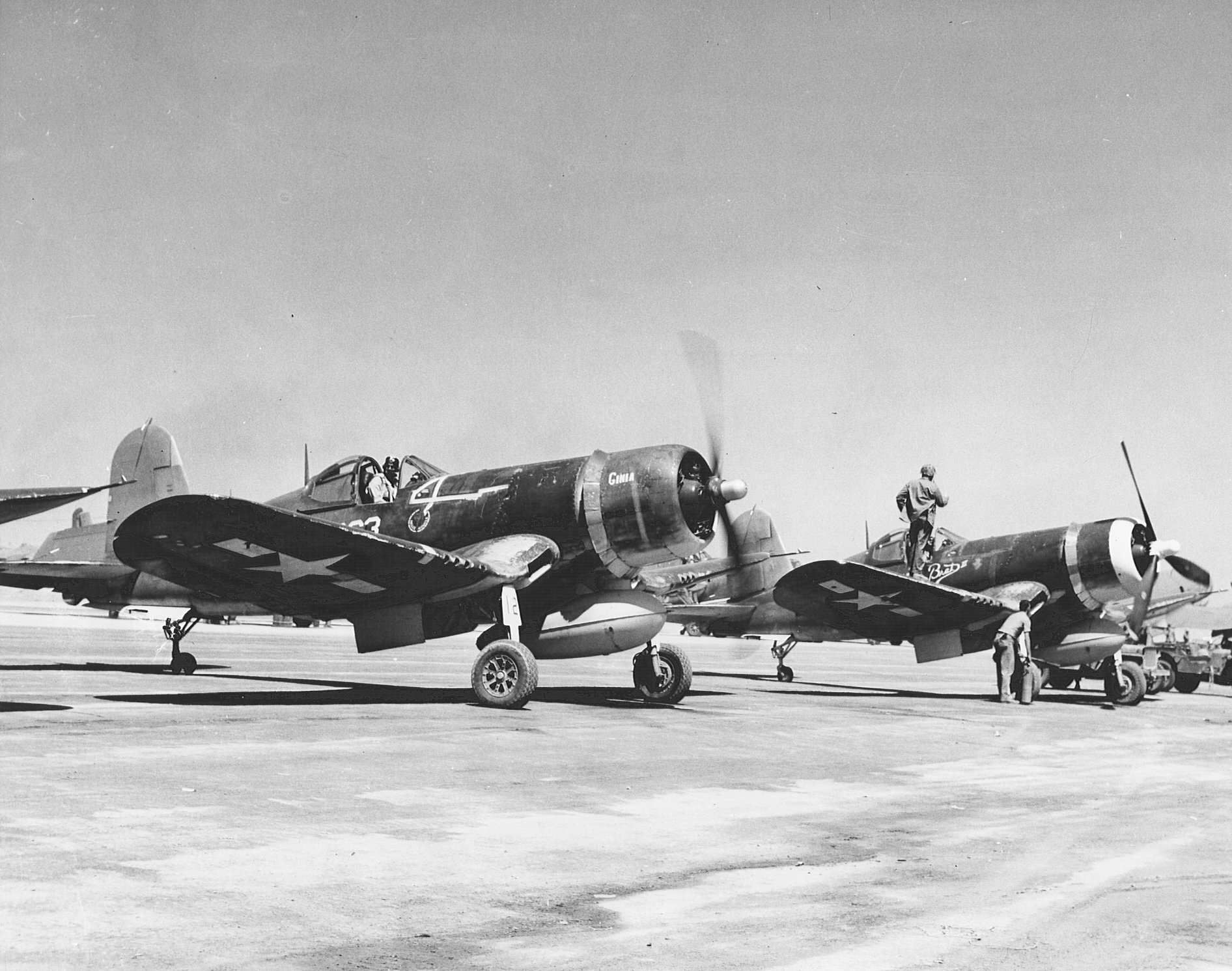
U.S. Marine Corps F4U Corsairs during WWII

In April 1944, after completing additional training, Caswell was assigned to VMF-221, which was equipped with the Vought F4U Corsair, at Santa Barbara, California, before being deployed aboard the aircraft carrier USS Bunker Hill (CV-17) in the Pacific in January 1945. Caswell and his unit took part in aerial attacks against the Japanese mainland. On March 18, he scored his first aerial victories when he shot down three A6M Zeros, while attacking an airfield in Miyazaki Prefecture.

On April 12, 1945, during the Battle of Okinawa, Caswell scored his fourth aerial victory when he shot down a Zero over Kikaijima. His biggest day came on April 28 while on a combat air patrol 150 miles north of Okinawa, he shot down a Kawasaki Ki-61 and his flight was vectored to a formation of 25 Zeros that were headed toward Task Force 58 and Okinawa. In the ensuing battle, Caswell's flight was credited with destroying eight Zeros, he himself shooting down two of them with the probable destruction of another. For his heroism in the aerial battle, he was awarded the Silver Star and earned the title of flying ace.

Bunker Hill was struck and severely damaged by two Japanese kamikaze planes on May 11, which resulted in 393 sailors and airmen killed, including 41 missing and never found, and 264 wounded. Caswell survived the attack, and he and other surviving airmen helped the firefighters in fighting the fire on the Bunker Hill.

During the war, Caswell was credited with the destruction of seven enemy aircraft in aerial combat, plus one probable destruction. After returning to the United States, Caswell was assigned as an F4U pilot with VMF-451 at MCAS El Centro in California, from June 1945 until he left active duty in November 1945.

=== Cold war ===
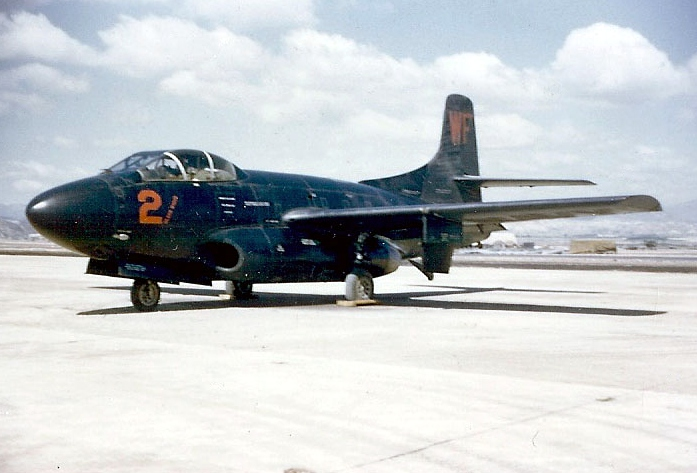
F3D Skyknight of VMF(N)-513 in Korea, 1952

After the end of World War II, Caswell served in various Marine Corps aviation units and attended additional flying training from January 1946 to April 1951.

During the Korean War, he was assigned to VMF(N)-513 as a F3D Skyknight pilot. Stationed at Pusan West (K-1) Air Base in South Korea, he flew night fighter escort missions for USAF B-29 Superfortresses attacking military and industrial targets in North Korea, while defending them against Communist MiG-15s. He flew missions from June to October 1952 and was transferred to VMC-1 in South Korea from October 1952 to February 1953. He returned to the United States in December 1953 and was assigned to MCAS El Toro.

Caswell served in a variety of command and staff positions over the next 15 years, including at MCAS Beaufort, where he served as commanding officer of MACS-6, from January to December 1964. His final position was as commanding officer of Headquarters and Service Battalion at MCRD Parris Island, from April 1966 until his retirement from the Marine Corps on December 31, 1968.

== Later life ==
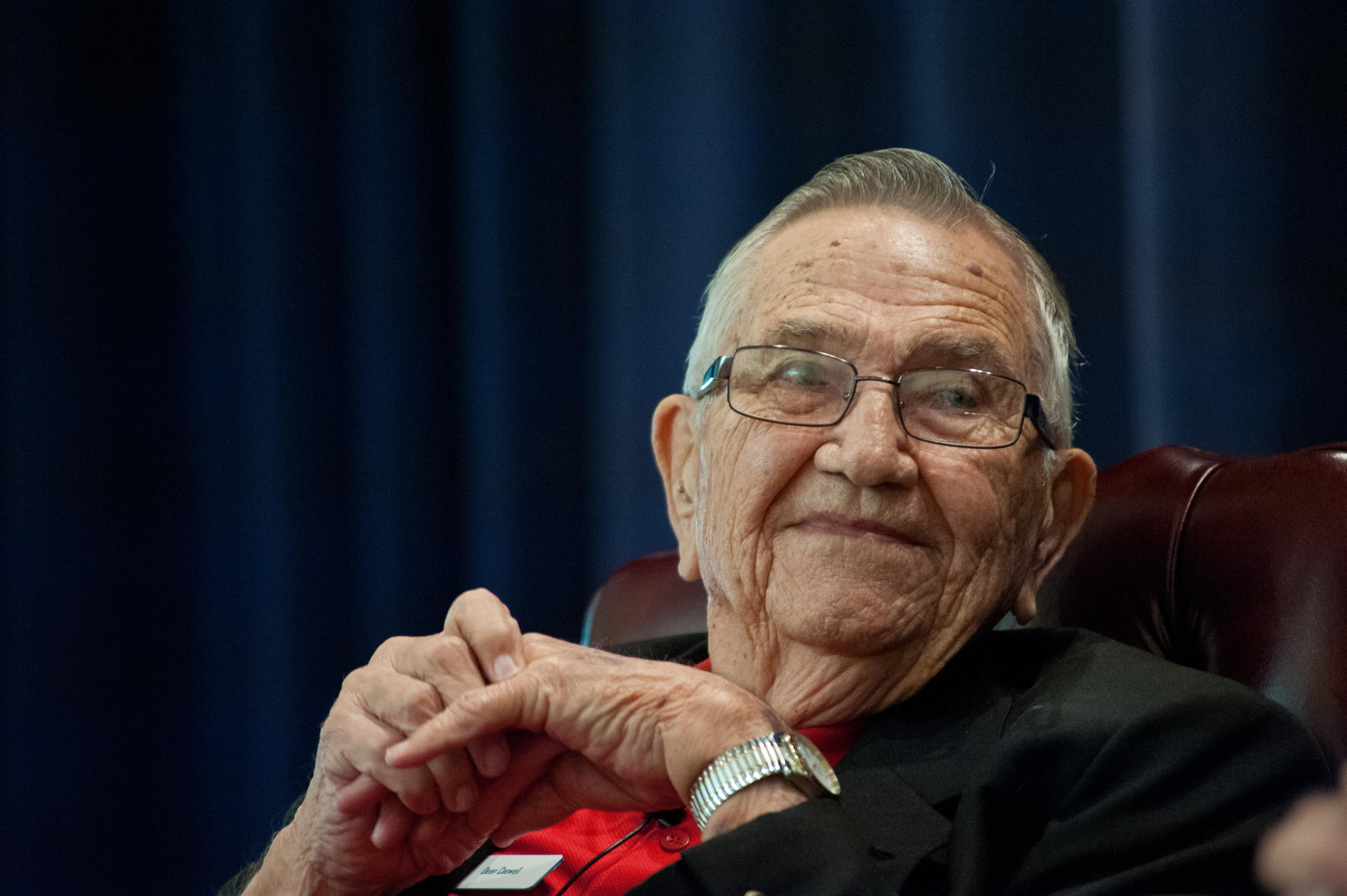
Dean Caswell at the Gathering of Eagles in 2016

Caswell was married twice and had seven children. After retirement from active service in 1968, he resided in Austin, Texas.

Caswell died at home on September 21, 2022, at age 100. He was buried at Cook Walden Forest Oaks Memorial Park in Austin.

== Awards and decorations ==
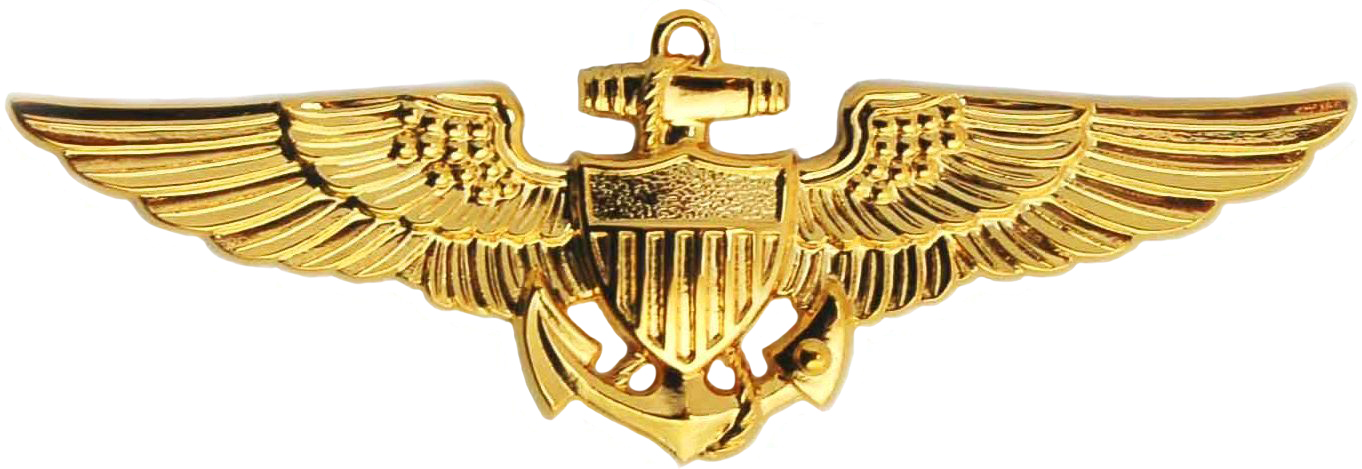

Naval Aviator Badge
Silver Star		Distinguished Flying Cross w/ one 5/16" gold star
Air Medal w/ four 5/16" gold stars	Navy Presidential Unit Citation	Navy Unit Commendation
American Campaign Medal	Asiatic-Pacific Campaign Medal w/ three 3/16" bronze stars	World War II Victory Medal
Navy Occupation Service Medal w/ 'Japan' clasp	National Defense Service Medal w/ 3/16" bronze star	Korean Service Medal w/ three 3/16" bronze stars
Republic of Korea Presidential Unit Citation	United Nations Korea Medal	Republic of Korea War Service Medal

=== Silver Star citation ===
Citation:

The President of the United States of America takes pleasure in presenting the Silver Star to First Lieutenant Dean Caswell, United States Marine Corps Reserve, for conspicuous gallantry and intrepidity as a Member of a six-plane flight of Fighter Planes in Marine Fighting Squadron TWO HUNDRED TWENTY-ONE (VMF-221), attached to the U.S.S. BUNKER HILL (CV-17), in action against enemy Japanese forces while on combat air patrol in the vicinity of Okinawa, Ryukyu Islands, on 28 April 1945. When his flight intercepted a formation of approximately thirty Japanese fighters approaching Okinawa to launch an attack on shipping and land installations, Second Lieutenant Caswell skillfully pressed home his attack against the greatly superior force and succeeded in shooting down three enemy planes and probably destroying one other. By his aggressive fighting spirit and skilled airmanship, he contributed materially to the outstanding record of his flight in destroying one other and routing the remainder, thereby protecting our ships and land installations. His conduct throughout was in keeping with the highest traditions of the United States Naval Service.
