= Battle of Midway =

1942 major naval battle in World War II

- Part of the Pacific War and World War II
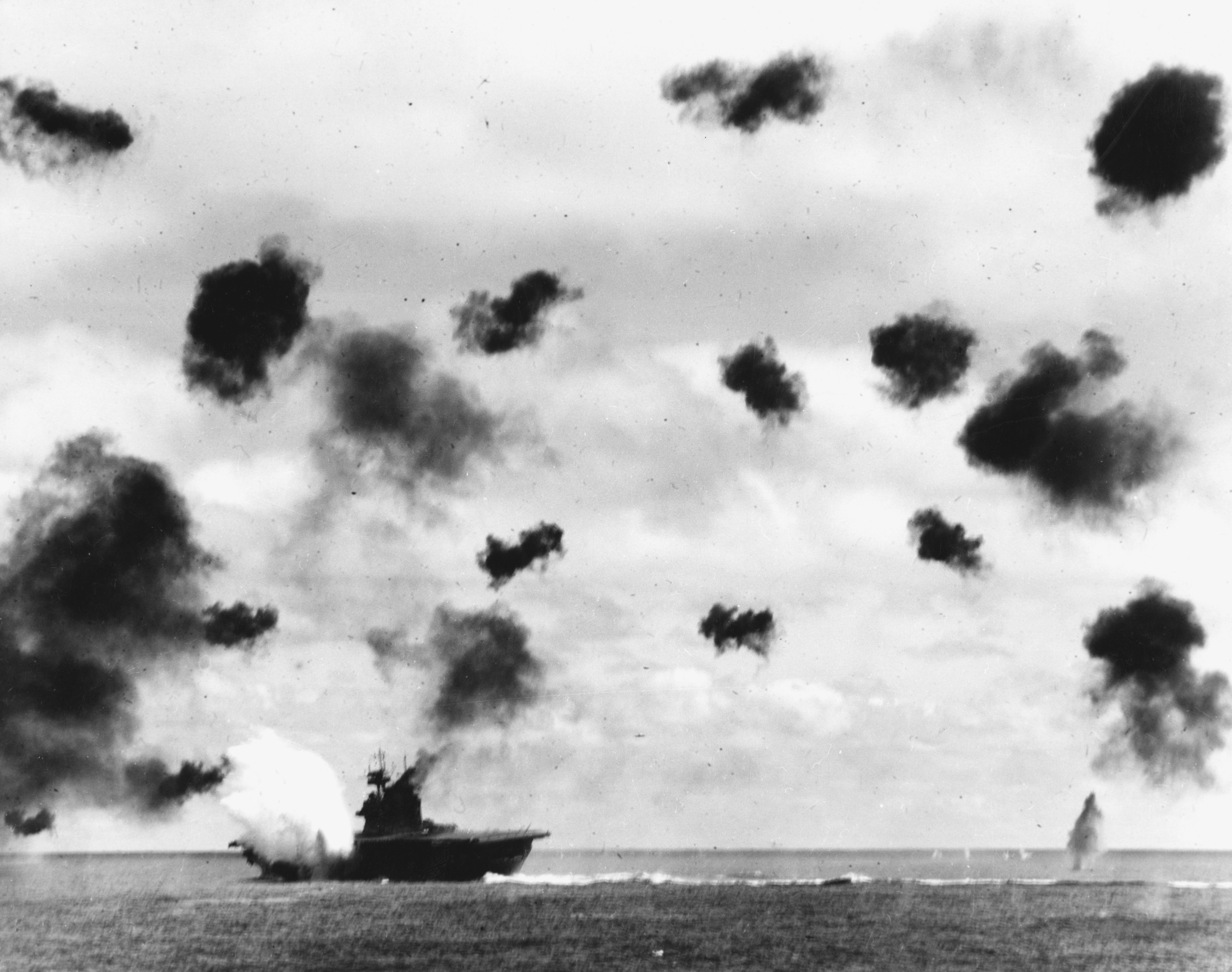
- USS Yorktown at the moment of impact by a Japanese torpedo, 4 June 1942
| Date | 4–7 June 1942; 84 years ago |
| Location | Midway Atoll; 30°N 178°W |
| Result | American victory |

Belligerents
| United States | Japan |

Commanders and leaders
| Chester Nimitz; Frank Jack Fletcher; Raymond Spruance | (Empire of Japan) Isoroku Yamamoto; (Empire of Japan) Nobutake Kondō; (Empire of Japan) Chūichi Nagumo; (Empire of Japan) Tamon Yamaguchi † |

Units involved
| Pacific Fleet: Task Force 16; Task Force 17; Midway Garrison; USAAF; USMC | (Empire of Japan) Combined Fleet: 1st Fleet; 2nd Fleet; 5th Fleet; 11th Air Fleet |

Strength
| 3 fleet carriers; 7 heavy cruisers; 1 light cruiser; 15 destroyers; 233 carrier-based aircraft; 127 land-based aircraft; 16 submarines; 9 PT boats | 1st Carrier Striking Force: 4 fleet carriers; 2 battleships; 2 heavy cruisers; 1 light cruiser; 12 destroyers; 248 carrier-based aircraft; 16 floatplanes; 13 submarines; Midway Support Force: 4 heavy cruisers; 2 destroyers; 12 floatplanes; Did not participate in battle: 2 light carriers; 5 battleships; 4 heavy cruisers; 2 light cruisers; ~35 support ships |

Casualties and losses
| 1 fleet carrier sunk; 1 destroyer sunk; fleet tonnage destroyed: 21,300 long tons (21,600 t); ~150 aircraft destroyed; ~307 KIA; including 3 killed as prisoners | 4 fleet carriers sunk; 1 heavy cruiser sunk; 1 heavy cruiser damaged; 2 destroyers damaged; fleet tonnage destroyed: 119,100 long tons (121,000 t); 248 aircraft destroyed; 3,057 KIA; 37 captured |

The Battle of Midway was a major naval battle in the Pacific Theater of World War II that took place on 4–7 June 1942, six months after Japan's attack on Pearl Harbor and one month after the Battle of the Coral Sea. The Japanese Combined Fleet under the command of Isoroku Yamamoto suffered a decisive defeat by two carrier strike groups of the U.S. Pacific Fleet near Midway Atoll, about 1,300 mi (1,100 nmi; 2,100 km) northwest of Oahu. Yamamoto had intended to capture Midway and lure out and destroy the U.S. Pacific Fleet, especially the aircraft carriers which had escaped damage at Pearl Harbor.

Before the battle, Japan desired to extend its Pacific defense perimeter, especially after the Doolittle air raid by US carrier based aircraft on Tokyo in April 1942, and to clear the seas for attacks on Midway, Fiji, Samoa, and Hawaii. A related Japanese attack on the Aleutian Islands began one day earlier, on 3 June. The Japanese strike force at Midway, known as the Kidō Butai, was commanded by Chuichi Nagumo. Yamamoto's plan for the operation, which depended on precise timing and coordination, was undermined by its wide dispersal of forces, which left the rest of the fleet unable to support the Kidō Butai effectively.

On 4 June, the Japanese began bombing Midway and prepared to wait for the Pacific Fleet to arrive from Pearl Harbor to defend the island. Unknown to Yamamoto, U.S. code breakers had determined the date and location of his planned attack, enabling the Americans to prepare their own ambush; Chester Nimitz, commander of the Pacific Fleet, had sent a large force under Frank Jack Fletcher to the Midway area before the Japanese had arrived. Land-based planes from Midway and carrier-based planes from the U.S. fleet surprised and attacked Nagumo's force at the precise time that his carriers were rearming and refueling: the carrier Akagi was immolated by a single direct hit which exploded among the armed and fueled aircraft. All four Japanese fleet carriers present at the battle—Akagi, Kaga, Sōryū, and Hiryū—were sunk, as was the heavy cruiser Mikuma. Japan also lost 3,000 men, including many well-trained and difficult-to-replace pilots. The U.S. lost the carrier Yorktown and the destroyer Hammann, while the carriers Enterprise and Hornet (under the command of Raymond Spruance during the battle) survived the fighting without damage.

The Battle of Midway, along with the Guadalcanal campaign, is widely considered a turning point in the Pacific War. After Midway and the attrition of the Solomon Islands campaign, Japan's ability to replace its losses in materiel and trained men rapidly became insufficient, while the Americans' massive industrial and training capabilities increased over time. Historian John Keegan called the battle "the most stunning and decisive blow in the history of naval warfare", while historian Craig Symonds called it "one of the most consequential naval engagements in world history, ranking alongside Salamis, Trafalgar, and Tsushima Strait, as both tactically decisive and strategically influential."

== Background ==
The extent of Japanese military expansion in the Pacific, April 1942

After expanding the war in the Pacific to include western colonies, the Japanese Empire quickly attained its initial strategic goals of British Hong Kong, the Philippines, British Malaya, Singapore, and the Dutch East Indies, the last of whose oil resources were particularly important to Japan. Because of this, preliminary planning for the second phase of operations commenced as early as January 1942.

Because of strategic disagreements between the Imperial Army (IJA) and Imperial Navy (IJN), and infighting between the Navy's Imperial General Headquarters and Admiral Isoroku Yamamoto's Combined Fleet, a follow-up strategy was not formed until April 1942. Yamamoto finally won the bureaucratic struggle with a thinly veiled threat to resign, after which his plan was adopted. Yamamoto's primary strategic goal was the elimination of America's carrier forces, which he regarded as the principal threat to the overall Pacific campaign. This concern was acutely heightened by the Doolittle Raid on 18 April 1942, in which 16 United States Army Air Forces (USAAF) B-25 Mitchell bombers launched from USS Hornet bombed targets in Tokyo and several other Japanese cities. The raid, while militarily insignificant, was a shock to the Japanese and highlighted a gap in the defenses around the Japanese home islands as well as the vulnerability of Japanese territory to American bombers.

This, along with other successful hit-and-run raids by American carriers in the South Pacific, showed that they were still a threat, although seemingly reluctant to be drawn into all-out battle. Yamamoto reasoned that another air attack on Naval Station Pearl Harbor would induce all of the American fleet to sail out to fight, including the carriers. However, considering the increased strength of American land-based airpower on the Hawaiian Islands since the 7 December 1941 attack, he judged that it was too risky to attack Pearl Harbor directly.

Instead, Yamamoto selected Midway, a tiny atoll at the extreme northwest end of the Hawaiian Island chain, approximately 1,300 mi (1,100 nmi; 2,100 km) from Oahu. Midway was outside the effective range of almost all the American aircraft stationed on the main Hawaiian Islands. It was not especially important in the larger scheme of Japan's intentions, but the Japanese felt the Americans would consider Midway a vital outpost of Pearl Harbor and would be compelled to defend it vigorously. The U.S. did indeed consider Midway vital: following the battle, the establishment of a U.S. submarine base on Naval Air Facility Midway Island allowed submarines operating from Pearl Harbor to refuel and re-provision, extending their radius of operations by 1,200 mi (1,900 km). In addition to serving as a seaplane base, Midway's airstrips were a forward staging point for bomber attacks on Wake Island.

=== Yamamoto's plan ===
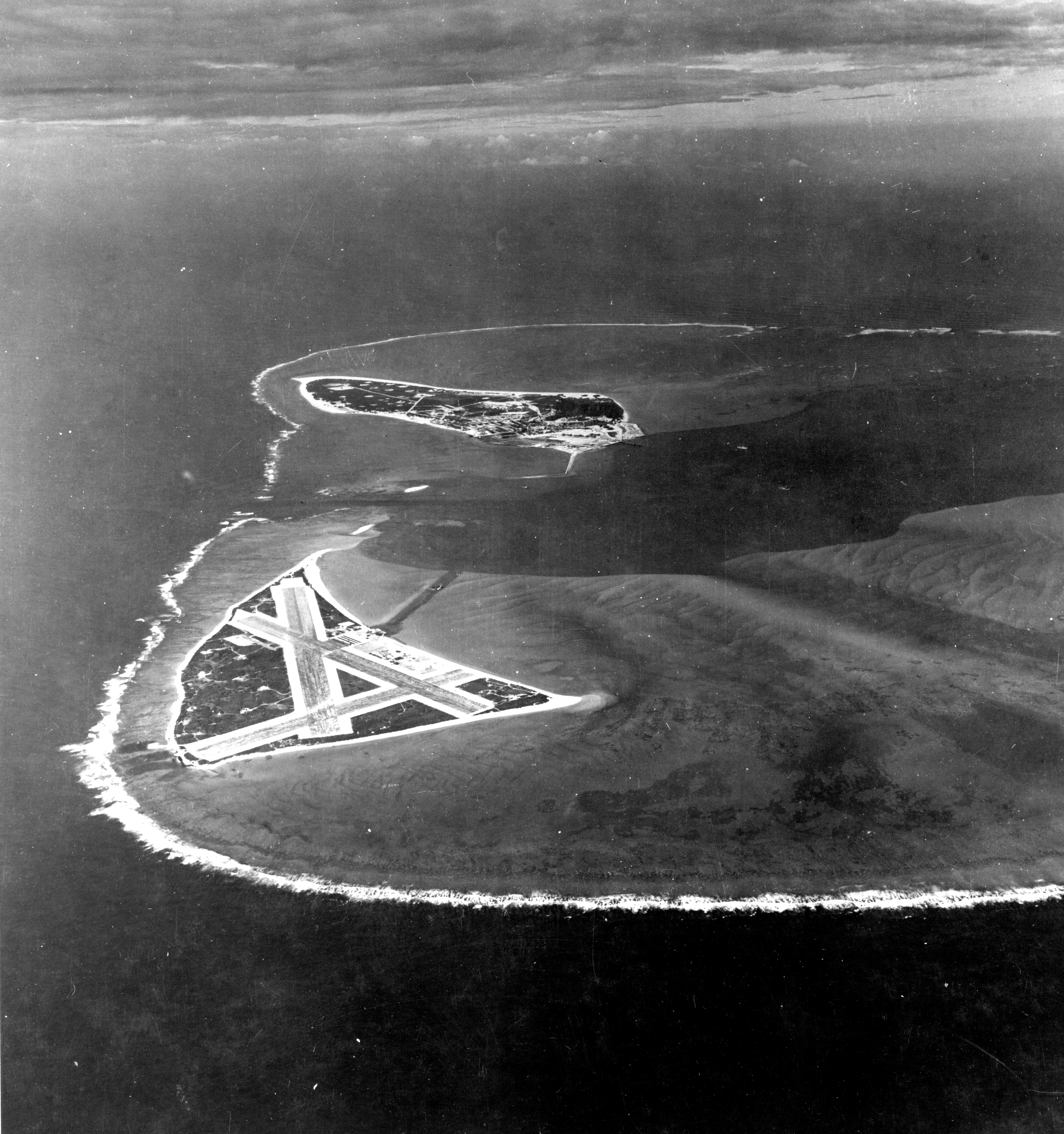
Midway Atoll, several months before the battle. Eastern Island (with the airfield) is in the foreground, and the larger Sand Island is in the background to the west.

Typical of Japanese naval planning during World War II, Yamamoto's battle plan for taking Midway (named Operation MI) was exceedingly complex. It required the careful coordination of multiple battle groups over hundreds of miles of open sea. His design was also predicated on optimistic intelligence suggesting that USS Enterprise and USS Hornet, forming Task Force 16, were the only carriers available to the Pacific Fleet. During the Battle of the Coral Sea one month earlier, USS Lexington had been sunk and USS Yorktown suffered so much damage that the Japanese believed she too had been lost. However, following hasty repairs at Pearl Harbor, Yorktown sortied and ultimately played a critical role in the discovery and eventual destruction of the Japanese fleet carriers at Midway. Finally, much of Yamamoto's planning, coinciding with the general feeling among the Japanese leadership at the time, was based on a gross misjudgement of American morale which was believed to be debilitated from the string of Japanese victories in the preceding months.

Yamamoto felt deception would be required to lure the U.S. fleet into a fatally compromised situation. To this end, he dispersed his forces so that their full extent (particularly his battleships) would be concealed from the Americans prior to battle. Critically, Yamamoto's supporting battleships and cruisers trailed Vice Admiral Chūichi Nagumo's carrier force by several hundred miles. The original plans for the Midway attack are missing, but one school of thought is they were intended to come up and destroy whatever elements of the American fleet might come to Midway's defense once Nagumo's carriers had weakened them sufficiently for a daylight gun battle. This tactic was doctrine in most major navies of the time. Another theory of Yamamoto's intentions says that he distrusted the effectiveness of battleships in general and had no intention to use them in the battle, but dispatched them only for reasons of Navy politics and morale. He had so far left the battleships out of combat, and he sought to appease the battleship faction on the Navy General Staff by himself sailing on the battleship Yamato.

Unknown to Yamamoto, the U.S. had broken parts of the main Japanese naval code (dubbed JN-25 by the Americans), divulging many details of his plan. His emphasis on dispersal prevented his formations from supporting each other. For instance, although Nagumo's carriers were expected to carry out strikes against Midway and bear the brunt of American counterattacks, the only warships in his fleet larger than the screening force of twelve destroyers were two Kongō-class fast battleships, two heavy cruisers, and one light cruiser. By contrast, Yamamoto and Kondo had between them two light carriers, five battleships, four heavy cruisers, and two light cruisers, none of which saw action at Midway.

The light carriers of the trailing forces and Yamamoto's three battleships were unable to keep pace with the carriers of the Kidō Butai (機動部隊; lit. 'Mobile Strike Force') and so could not sail in company with them. The Kidō Butai would sail into range at best speed so as to increase the chance of surprise and would not have ships spread out across the ocean guiding the US Navy toward it. If the other parts of the invasion force needed more defense, the Kidō Butai would make best speed to defend them. Hence the slower ships could not be with the Kidō Butai. The distance between Yamamoto and Kondo's forces and Nagumo's carriers had grave implications during the battle. The invaluable reconnaissance capability of the scout planes carried by the cruisers and carriers, and the additional anti-aircraft capability of the cruisers and the other two battleships of the Kongō class in the trailing forces, were unavailable to help Nagumo.

=== Aleutian invasion ===
To obtain support from the IJA for the Midway operation, the IJN agreed to support their invasion of the United States through the Aleutian Islands of Attu and Kiska, part of the Alaska Territory. The IJA occupied these islands to place the Japanese home islands out of range of U.S. land-based bombers in Alaska. Most Americans feared that the occupied islands would be used as bases for Japanese bombers to attack strategic targets and population centers along the U.S. West Coast.

The Japanese operations in the Aleutians (Operation AL) removed yet more ships that could otherwise have augmented the force striking Midway. Whereas many earlier historical accounts considered the Aleutians operation as a feint to draw American forces away, according to the original Japanese battle plan, AL was intended to be launched simultaneously with the attack on Midway. A one-day delay in the sailing of Nagumo's task force resulted in Operation AL beginning a day before the Midway attack.

== Prelude ==
=== American reinforcements ===
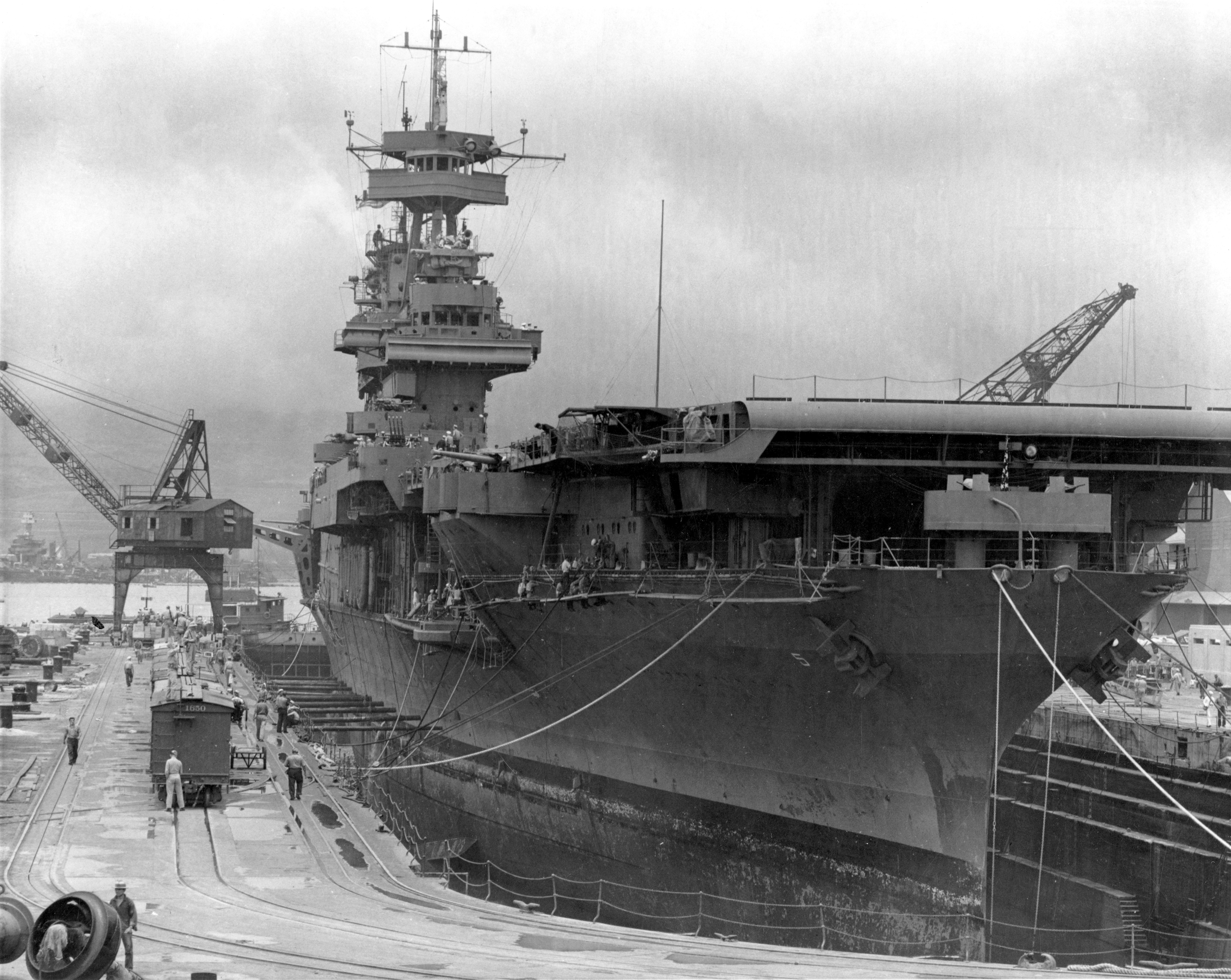
USS Yorktown at Pearl Harbor days before the battle.

To do battle with the IJN, expected to muster four or five carriers, Admiral Chester W. Nimitz, Commander in Chief, Pacific Ocean Areas, needed every available flight deck. He already had Vice Admiral William Halsey's two-carrier (Enterprise and Hornet) task force at hand, though Halsey was stricken with shingles and had to be replaced by Rear Admiral Raymond A. Spruance, Halsey's escort commander. Nimitz also hurriedly recalled Rear Admiral Frank Jack Fletcher's task force, including the carrier Yorktown, from the South West Pacific Area.

Despite estimates that Yorktown, damaged in the Battle of the Coral Sea, would require several months of repairs at Puget Sound Naval Shipyard, her elevators were intact and her flight deck largely so. The Pearl Harbor Naval Shipyard worked around the clock, and in 72 hours she was restored to a battle-ready state, judged good enough for two or three weeks of operations, as Nimitz required. Her flight deck was patched, and whole sections of internal frames were cut out and replaced. Repairs continued even as she sortied, with work crews from the repair ship USS Vestal, herself damaged in the attack on Pearl Harbor six months earlier, still aboard.

Yorktown's partially depleted air group was rebuilt using whatever planes and pilots could be found. Scouting Five (VS-5) was replaced with Bombing Three (VB-3) from USS Saratoga. Torpedo Five (VT-5) was replaced by Torpedo Three (VT-3). Fighting Three (VF-3) was reconstituted to replace VF-42 with sixteen pilots from VF-42 and eleven pilots from VF-3, with Lieutenant Commander John Thach in command. Some of the aircrew were inexperienced, which may have contributed to an accident in which Thach's executive officer Lieutenant Commander Donald Lovelace was killed. Despite efforts to get Saratoga (which had been undergoing repairs on the American West Coast) ready, the need to resupply and assemble sufficient escorts meant she was able to reach Midway only after the battle.

On Midway, the U.S. Navy had by 4 June stationed four squadrons of PBYs—31 aircraft in total—for long-range reconnaissance duties, and six brand-new Grumman TBF Avengers from Hornet's VT-8. The Marine Corps stationed 19 Douglas SBD Dauntless, seven F4F-3 Wildcats, 17 Vought SB2U Vindicators, and 21 Brewster F2A Buffalos. The USAAF contributed a squadron of 17 B-17 Flying Fortresses and four Martin B-26 Marauders equipped with torpedoes: in total 122 aircraft. Although the F2As and SB2Us were already obsolete, they were the only aircraft available to the Marine Corps at the time.

=== Japanese shortcomings ===
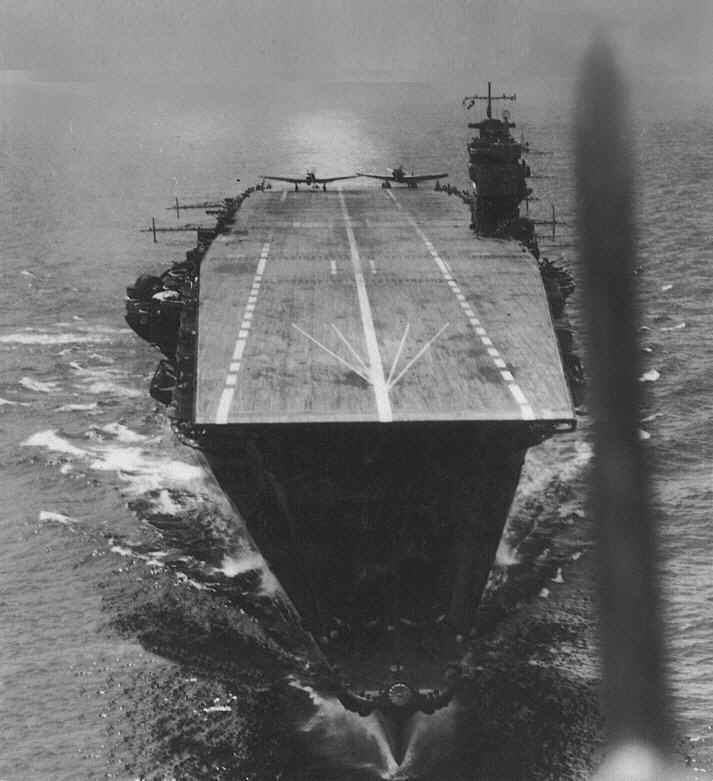
Akagi (April 1942)

During the Battle of the Coral Sea one month earlier, the Japanese light carrier Shōhō had been sunk and the fleet carrier Shōkaku had been severely damaged and was in drydock for repair. Although the fleet carrier Zuikaku escaped the battle undamaged, she had lost almost half her air group and was in port at the Kure Naval District in Hiroshima, awaiting replacement aircraft and pilots. That there were none immediately available can be attributed to the growing inability of the IJN to properly train pilots faster than they were killed in action. In desperation, instructors from the Yokosuka Air Corps were relieved of their duties to plug the gap.

Thus, Carrier Division 5, consisting of the two most advanced aircraft carriers of the Kido Butai, was not available which meant that Vice-Admiral Nagumo had only two-thirds of the fleet carriers at his disposal: Kaga and Akagi forming Carrier Division 1 and Hiryū and Sōryū making up Carrier Division 2. This was partly due to fatigue; Japanese carriers had been constantly on operations since 7 December 1941 including raids on Darwin and Colombo. Nonetheless, the First Carrier Strike Force sailed with 248 available aircraft on the four carriers: 60 on Akagi, 74 on Kaga (B5N2 squadron oversized), 57 on Hiryū and 57 on Sōryū.

The main Japanese carrier-borne strike aircraft were the Aichi D3A1 "Val" dive bomber and the Nakajima B5N2 "Kate", which was used either as a torpedo bomber or as a level bomber. The main carrier fighter was the fast and highly maneuverable Mitsubishi A6M Zero. For a variety of reasons, production of the "Val" had been drastically reduced, while that of the "Kate" had been stopped completely and, as a consequence, there were none available to replace losses. In addition, many of the aircraft being used during the June 1942 operations had been operational since late November 1941 and, although they were well-maintained, many were almost worn out and had become increasingly unreliable. These factors meant all carriers of the Kidō Butai had fewer aircraft than their normal complement, with few spare aircraft or parts in the carriers' hangars. (Note: The code names "Val", "Kate" and "Zeke", which are often applied to these aircraft, were not introduced until late 1943 by the Allied forces. The D3A was normally referred to by the Japanese as Type 99 Navy dive bomber, the B5N as the Type 97 Navy torpedo bomber and the A6M as the Type 0 Navy fighter; the latter was colloquially known as the "Zero".)

In addition, Nagumo's carrier force suffered from several defensive deficiencies: "it could throw a punch but couldn't take one." The carriers' fueling systems consisted of a network of highly flammable fuel-filled lines that allowed fires to spread rapidly. The carrier interiors were composed of wood flooring, internal timber support beams, cotton pipe insulation, and other flammable materials. The firefighting systems were fed by water mains that were vulnerable to bomb or fire damage. The carriers were not even equipped with fire-suppressing foam—firefighting teams had to make do with water alone.

Furthermore, the IJN's fleet combat air patrol (CAP) had too few fighter aircraft and was hampered by an inadequate early warning system, including a lack of radar. Poor radio communications with the fighter aircraft inhibited effective command and control. The carriers' escorting warships were deployed not as close anti-aircraft escorts, but rather to be visual scouts in a ring at long range, as they lacked training, doctrine, and sufficient anti-aircraft guns.

Japanese strategic scouting arrangements prior to the battle were also in disarray. A picket line of Japanese submarines was late getting into position (partially owing to Yamamoto's haste), which let the American carriers reach their assembly point northeast of Midway (known as "Point Luck") without being detected. A second attempt at reconnaissance, using four-engine H8K "Emily" flying boats to scout Pearl Harbor prior to the battle and detect whether the American carriers were present, part of Operation K, was thwarted when Japanese submarines assigned to refuel the search aircraft discovered that the intended refueling point—a hitherto deserted bay off French Frigate Shoals—was occupied by American warships because the Japanese had carried out an identical mission in March. Thus, Japan was deprived of any knowledge concerning the movements of the American carriers immediately before the battle.

Japanese radio intercepts did notice an increase in American submarine activity and message traffic. This information was in Yamamoto's and Nagumo's hands prior to the battle. Japanese plans were not changed; Yamamoto, at sea in Yamato, assumed Nagumo had received the same signal from Tokyo and did not communicate with him by radio, so as not to reveal his position. Given that Yamamoto did not want to reveal his position, we can know that Yamamoto had decided that the Americans were not preparing to successfully ambush him at Midway, with his idea being that even if they were preparing to defend Midway, they would not know all the details of what defense was required – what defense, where, and most critically, when. The Japanese had information that there was no USN fleet rushing from Pearl Harbour to Midway due to the IJN approaching Midway. One great Japanese blunder was to run the Aleutians attack before the Midway attack, as the admirals could not infer much from increased preparations for defense of Midway and Pearl Harbor, as they might have just been on high alert due to the Aleutians attack. Had the Aleutians attack been run after the Battle of Midway, the Midway admirals may have deduced the Americans were preparing a defense of Midway.

=== U.S. code-breaking ===
Nimitz had one critical advantage: U.S. cryptanalysts had partially broken the Japanese Navy's JN-25b code. Since early 1942, the U.S. had been decoding messages stating that there would soon be an operation at objective "AF." It was initially not known where "AF" was, but Commander Joseph Rochefort and his team at Station HYPO were able to confirm that it was Midway: Captain Wilfred Holmes devised the ruse of telling the base at Midway (by secure undersea communications cable) to broadcast an uncoded radio message stating that Midway's water purification system had broken down. Within 24 hours, the code breakers picked up a Japanese message that "AF was short on water." The Japanese seemed unconcerned that the Americans were broadcasting uncoded that a major naval installation close to the Japanese was having a water shortage, which Japanese intelligence might have suspected as deception. HYPO was also able to determine the date of the attack as either 4 or 5 June, and to provide Nimitz with a complete IJN order of battle.

Japan had a new codebook, but its introduction had been delayed, enabling HYPO to read messages for several crucial days; the new code, which took several days to be cracked, came into use on 24 May, but the important breaks had already been made. As a result, the Americans entered the battle with a good picture of where, when, and in what strength the Japanese would appear. Nimitz knew that the Japanese had negated their numerical advantage by dividing their ships into four separate task groups, so widely separated that it was essentially impossible for any one group to support another. This dispersal resulted in few fast ships being available to escort the Carrier Striking Force, thus reducing the number of anti-aircraft guns protecting the carriers. Nimitz calculated that the airplanes on his three carriers, combined with support on Midway Island, gave the U.S. rough parity with Yamamoto's four carriers, mainly because American carrier air groups were larger than Japanese ones. The Japanese, by contrast, remained largely unaware of their opponent's true strength and dispositions even after the battle began.

== Battle ==
Movements during the battle, according to William Koenig in Epic Sea Battles

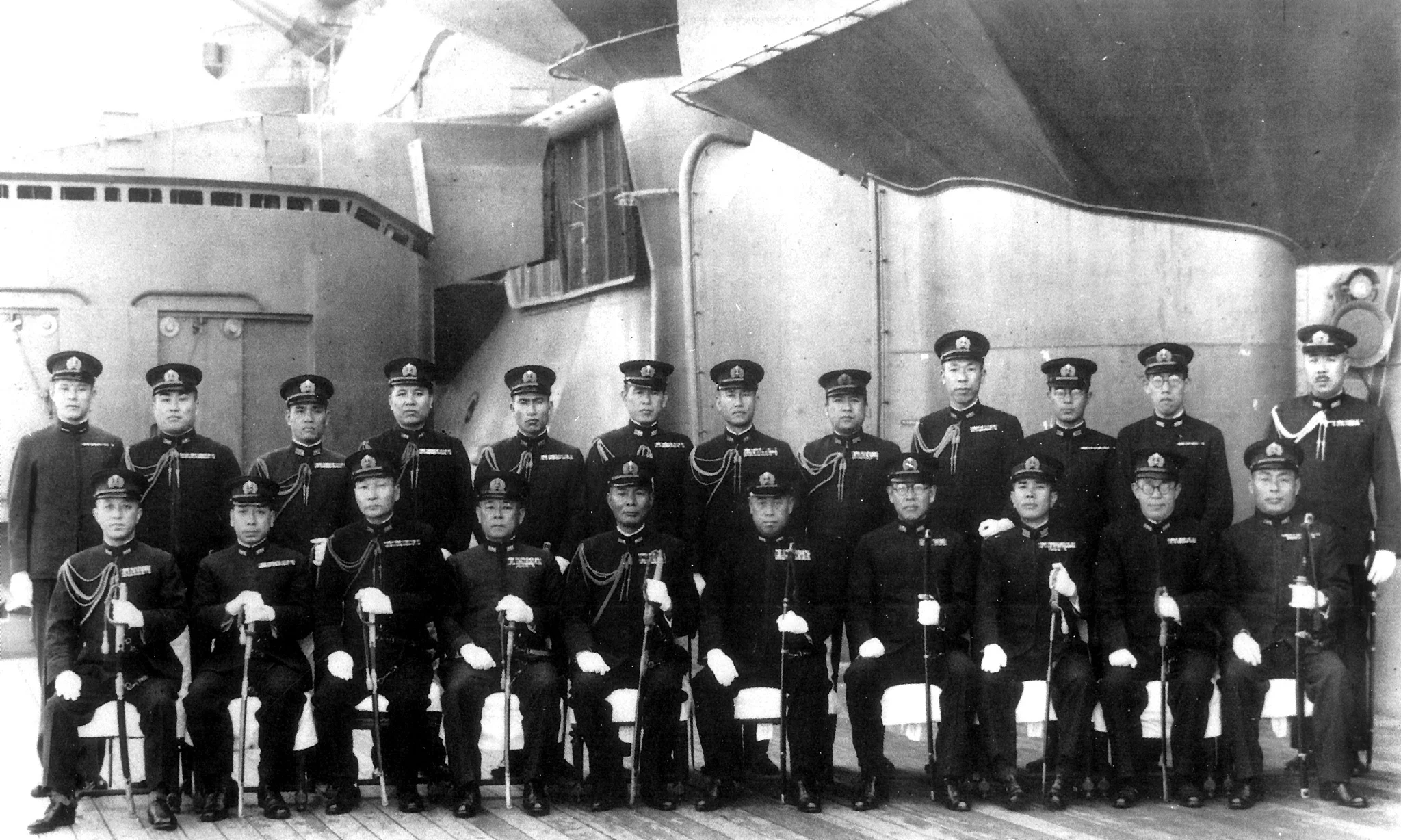
Commemorative photo of Combined Fleet Headquarters staff on board the Yamato. The sixth person from the left is Commander-in-Chief Admiral Isoroku Yamamoto, and the fifth person his Chief of Staff Vice Admiral Matome Ugaki.

=== Initial air attacks ===
Timeline of the Battle of Midway (acc. to William Koenig)
4 June
- 04:30 First Japanese takeoff against Midway Islands
- 04:30 10 planes (Yorktown) begin to search for the Japanese ships
- 05:34 Japanese ships detected by a PBY from Midway I.
- 07:10 6 TBF Avengers and 4 USAAF B-26 (from Midway I.) attack
- 07:15 Nagumo prepares reserve aircraft for second attack on Midway, in direct violation of Yamamoto's order
- 07:40 American Naval Force spotted by Tone No. 4
- 07:50 67 dive bombers, 29 torpedo bombers, 20 Wildcats take off (Spruance)
- 07:55 16 dive bombers of the U.S. Navy (from Midway I.) attack
- 08:10 15 B-17s (from Midway Islands) attack
- 08:20 11 bombers of the U.S. Navy (from Midway I.) attack
- 08:20 "The enemy is accompanied by what appears to be a carrier" by Tone No. 4.
- 09:06 12 torpedo bombers, 17 dive bombers, 6 Wildcats take off (Yorktown)
- 09:10 Tomonaga's strike force safely landed
- 09:18 Nagumo to Northeast
- 09:25 15 torpedo bombers (Hornet) attack
- 09:30 14 torpedo bombers (Enterprise) attack
- 10:00 12 torpedo bombers (Yorktown) attack
- 10:25 30 dive bombers (Enterprise) attack Akagi and Kaga
- 10:25 17 dive bombers (Yorktown) attack Soryū
- 11:00 18 Vals and 6 Zeros take off from Hiryū
- 11:30 10 planes (Yorktown) take off to search for remaining Japanese ships
- 12:05 First attack on Yorktown
- 13:30 Hiryū detected by a Yorktown plane
- 13:31 10 Kates and 6 Zeros take off from Hiryū
- 13:40 Yorktown again in service, making 18 knots
- 14:30 Second attack on Yorktown
- 15:00 Yorktown abandoned
- 15:30 24 dive bombers take off against Hiryū from Enterprise
- 16:10 Soryū sinks
- 17:00 Dive bombers attack on Hiryū
- 19:25 Kaga sinks
5 June
- 05:00 Akagi sinks
- 09:00 Hiryū sinks
7 June
- 07:00 Yorktown sinks

At about 09:00 on 3 June, Ensign Jack Reid, piloting a PBY from U.S. Navy patrol squadron VP-44, spotted the Japanese Occupation Force 500 nmi (580 mi; 930 km) to the west-southwest of Midway. He mistakenly reported this group as the Main Force. Nine B-17s took off from Midway at 12:30 for the first air attack. Three hours later, they found Tanaka's transport group 570 nmi (660 mi; 1,060 km) to the west.

Harassed by heavy anti-aircraft fire, they dropped their bombs. Although their crews reported hitting four ships, none were actually hit and no significant damage was inflicted. Early the following morning, the Japanese oil tanker Akebono Maru sustained the first hit when a torpedo from an attacking PBY struck her around 01:00. This was the only successful air-launched torpedo attack by the U.S. during the battle.

At 04:30 on 4 June, Nagumo launched his initial attack on Midway, consisting of 36 D3As and 36 B5Ns, escorted by 36 Zero fighters. At the same time, he launched his seven search aircraft (2 B5Ns from Akagi and Kaga; 4 Aichi E13A "Jakes" from the heavy cruisers Tone and Chikuma; and 1 short-range Nakajima E8N "Dave" from the battlecruiser Haruna; an eighth aircraft from Tone launched 30 minutes late). Japanese reconnaissance arrangements were flimsy, with too few aircraft to adequately cover the assigned search areas, laboring under poor weather conditions to the northeast and east of the task force. As Nagumo's bombers and fighters were taking off, 11 PBYs were leaving Midway to run their search patterns. At 05:34, a PBY reported sighting two Japanese carriers; another spotted the inbound airstrike 10 minutes later.

Midway's radar picked up the Japanese at 05:53, at a distance of 93 nautical miles, and interceptors were scrambled. Unescorted bombers headed off to attack the Japanese carriers, their fighter escorts remaining behind to defend Midway. Having taken off at 06:00 Midway-based Marine fighters of VMF-221 led by Major Floyd B. Parks, which included six F4Fs and twenty F2As, intercepted the Japanese at 06:20 and suffered heavy losses, though they destroyed four B5Ns and one Zero. Within the first few minutes, two F4Fs and thirteen F2As were destroyed, while most of the surviving U.S. planes were damaged, with only two remaining airworthy. Major Parks was among the lost. From 06:34 onwards, Japanese carrier aircraft bombed and heavily damaged the U.S. base. American anti-aircraft fire was intense and accurate, destroying three Japanese aircraft and damaging many more.

Of the 108 Japanese aircraft that participated in this attack, 11 were destroyed (including 3 that ditched), 14 were heavily damaged, and 29 were damaged to some degree. One hundred forty more were available to the Japanese, but never launched, and were ultimately destroyed when their carriers sank. The initial Japanese attack failed their objective in neutralizing Midway: American bombers could still use the airbase to refuel and attack the Japanese, and most of Midway's land-based defenses remained intact. Japanese pilots reported to Nagumo that a second aerial attack on Midway's defenses would be necessary if troops were to go ashore by 7 June.

Having taken off prior to the Japanese attack, American bombers based on Midway made several attacks on the Japanese carrier force. These included six Grumman Avengers, detached to Midway from Hornet's VT-8 (Midway being the combat debut of both VT-8 and the Avenger); Marine Scout-Bombing Squadron 241 (VMSB-241), consisting of 11 SB2U-3s and 16 SBDs, plus four USAAF B-26s of the 18th Reconnaissance and 69th Bomb Squadrons armed with torpedoes, and 15 B-17s of the 31st, 72nd, and 431st Bomb Squadrons. The Japanese repelled these attacks, losing only three Zero fighters while destroying five Avengers, two SB2Us, eight SBDs, and two B-26s. Among the dead was Major Lofton R. Henderson of VMSB-241, killed while leading his inexperienced SBD squadron into action. (The main airfield at Guadalcanal was named after him in August 1942.)

One B-26, piloted by Lieutenant James Muri, after dropping his torpedo and searching for an escape route, flew directly down the length of Akagi while being fired upon by fighters and anti-aircraft fire, which had to hold their fire to avoid hitting their own flagship; the B-26 strafed Akagi, killing two men. Another B-26, piloted by Lieutenant Herbert Mayes, did not pull out of its run after being seriously damaged by anti-aircraft fire, and instead flew directly at Akagi's bridge. Either attempting a suicide ramming or losing control, the plane narrowly missed striking the bridge, which could have killed Nagumo and his staff, crashing into the ocean. This experience may well have contributed to Nagumo's determination to launch another attack on Midway in direct violation of Yamamoto's order to keep the reserve strike force armed for anti-ship operations.

While the air strikes from Midway were happening, American submarine USS Nautilus, commanded by Lieutenant Commander William Brockman, approached the Japanese fleet, attracting attention from the escorts. Around 08:20, she made an unsuccessful torpedo attack on a battleship and then dived to evade escorts. At 09:10, she launched a torpedo at a cruiser and made another evasive dive, with destroyer Arashi spending considerable time chasing Nautilus.

=== Nagumo's dilemma ===
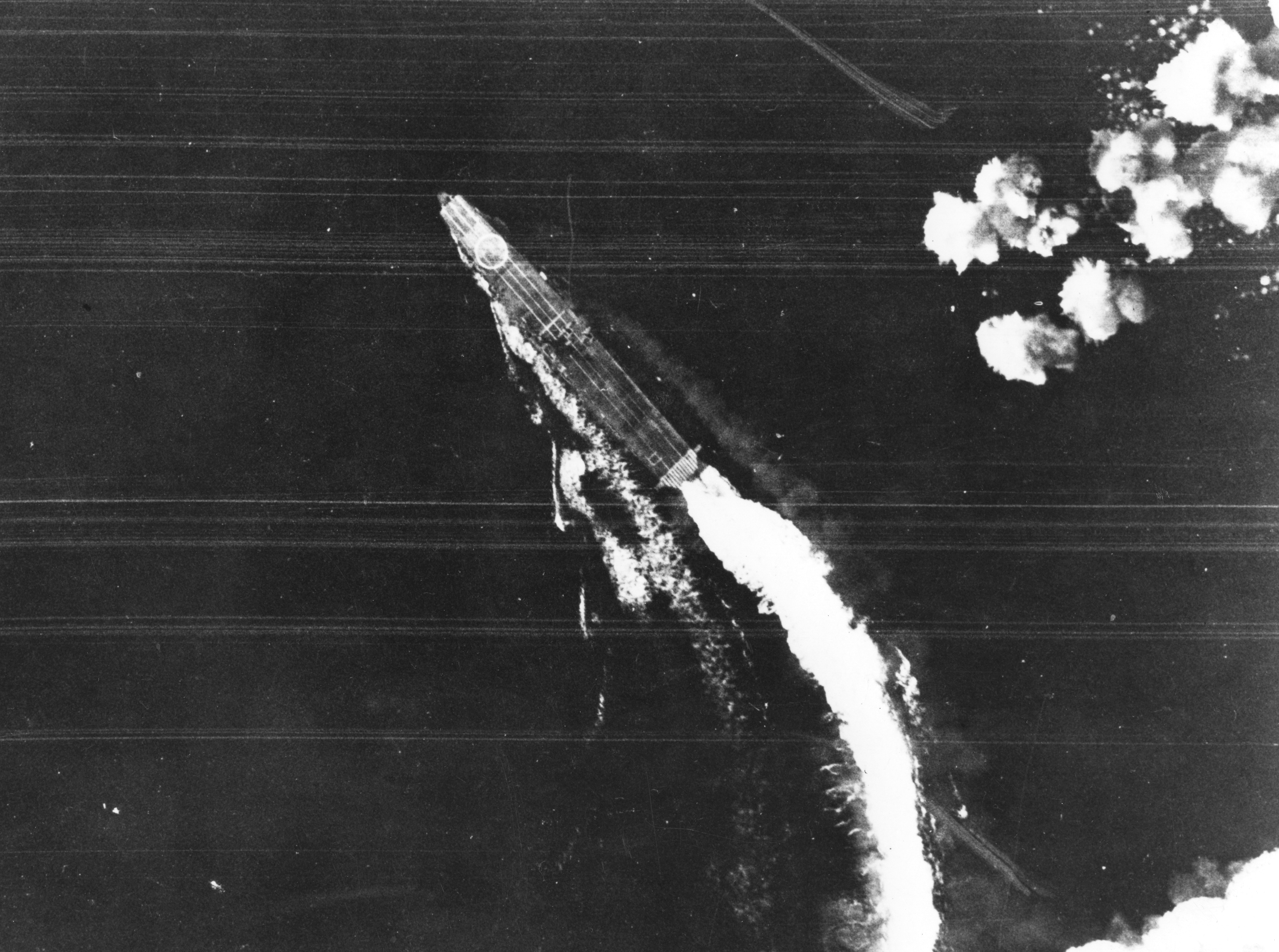
A B-17 attack misses Hiryū; this was taken between 08:00 and 08:30. A Shotai of three Zeros is lined up near the bridge. This was one of several combat air patrols launched during the day.

In accordance with Yamamoto's orders for Operation MI, Nagumo had kept half of his aircraft in reserve: two squadrons each of dive bombers and torpedo bombers. The dive bombers were as yet unarmed (standard procedure was to arm dive bombers after they were on the flight deck). The torpedo bombers were armed with torpedoes against possible American warships.

At 07:15, Nagumo ordered his reserve planes to be re-armed with contact-fused general-purpose bombs for use against land targets. This was to counter the attacks from Midway, as well as the morning flight commander's recommendation of a second strike. Re-arming had been underway for about 30 minutes when, at 07:40, the delayed scout plane from Tone signaled that it had sighted a sizable American naval force to the east, but did not specify its composition. Later evidence suggests Nagumo did not receive the sighting report until 08:00.

Nagumo swiftly reversed his order to re-arm the bombers and demanded the scout plane to ascertain the type of ships in the American force. Another 20–40 minutes elapsed before Tone's scout finally radioed the presence of a single carrier in the American force. (This was one of the carriers from Task Force 16: the other carrier was not sighted.)

Nagumo now faced a quandary. Rear Admiral Tamon Yamaguchi, leading Carrier Division 2 (Hiryū and Sōryū), suggested that he strike immediately with the forces at hand: 16 D3A1 dive bombers on Sōryū and 18 on Hiryū, with half the ready cover patrol aircraft. Nagumo's opportunity to hit the American ships was now limited by the imminent return of his Midway strike force. The returning strike force needed to land promptly or it would have to ditch into the sea. Because of the constant flight deck activity associated with combat air patrol operations during the preceding hour, the Japanese never had an opportunity to position ("spot") their reserve planes on the flight deck for launch.

What few aircraft remaining on the Japanese flight decks at the time of the attack were either defensive fighters or, in the case of Sōryū, fighters being spotted to augment the combat air patrol. Spotting his flight decks and launching aircraft would have required at least 30 minutes. Furthermore, by spotting and launching immediately, Nagumo would be committing some of his reserves to battle without proper anti-ship armament, and likely without fighter escort. Indeed, he had just witnessed how easily the unescorted American bombers had been shot down.

Japanese naval doctrine preferred the launching of fully constituted strikes rather than piecemeal attacks. Without confirmation of whether the American force included carriers (not received until 08:20), Nagumo's reaction respected doctrine. The arrival of another land-based American air strike at 07:53 gave weight to the need to attack the island again. Nagumo decided to wait for his first strike force to land, and then launch the reserve, which would by then be properly armed with torpedoes.

Had Nagumo instead launched the available aircraft around 07:45 and risked the ditching of Tomonaga's aircraft, they could have formed a powerful and well-balanced force with the potential to sink two American carriers. Additionally, fueled and armed aircraft inside the ships presented a significant additional hazard for damage to the carriers in an event of attack, and keeping them on the decks was much more dangerous than getting them airborne. Whatever the case, at that point there was no way to stop the American strike against him, since Fletcher's carriers had launched their planes beginning at 07:00 (with Enterprise and Hornet having completed launching by 07:55, but Yorktown not until 09:08), so the aircraft that would deliver the crushing blow were already on their way. Even if Nagumo had not strictly followed carrier doctrine, he could not have prevented the launch of the American attack.

=== Attacks on the Japanese fleet ===
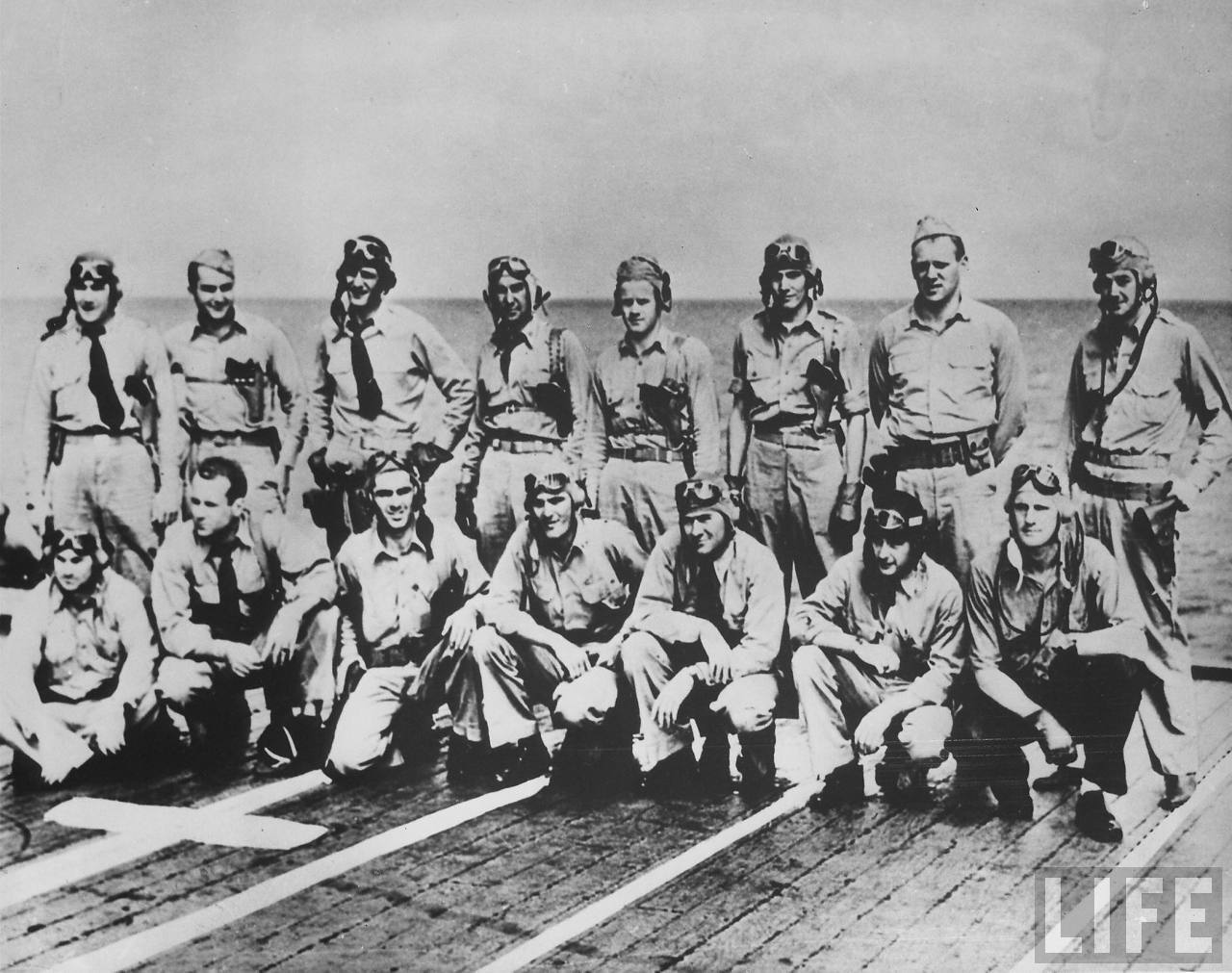
Pilots of Navy Torpedo Squadron 8 (VT-8) aboard USS Hornet, circa mid-May 1942. Only one member of VT-8 who flew from Hornet on 4 June 1942 survived in the action.

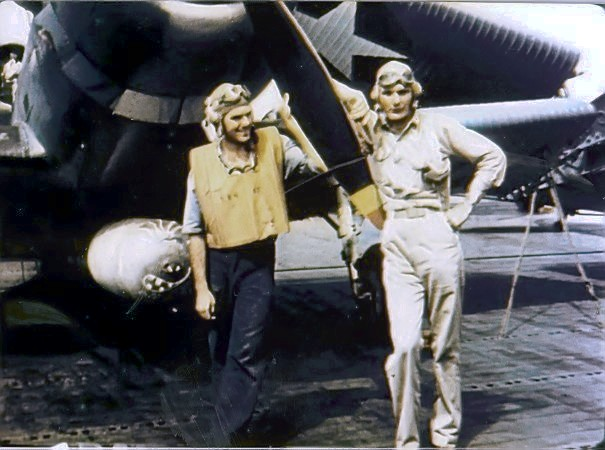
Ensign George Gay (right), sole survivor of VT-8's TBD Devastator squadron pilots who flew that day, in front of his aircraft, 4 June 1942

The Americans had already launched their carrier aircraft against the Japanese. Fletcher, in overall command aboard Yorktown, and benefiting from PBY sighting reports from the early morning, ordered Spruance to launch against the Japanese as soon as was practical, while initially holding Yorktown in reserve in case any other Japanese carriers were found.

Spruance judged that, though the range was extreme, a strike could succeed and gave the order to launch the attack. He left Halsey's Chief of Staff, Captain Miles Browning, to work out the details and oversee the launch. The carriers had to launch into the wind, so the light southeasterly breeze would require them to steam away from the Japanese at high speed. Browning, therefore, suggested a launch time of 07:00, giving the carriers an hour to close on the Japanese at 25 kn (46 km/h; 29 mph). This would place them at about 155 nmi (287 km; 178 mi) from the Japanese fleet, assuming it did not change course. The first plane took off from Spruance's carriers Enterprise and Hornet a few minutes after 07:00. Fletcher, upon completing his own scouting flights, followed suit at 08:00 from Yorktown.

Fletcher, along with Yorktown's commanding officer, Captain Elliott Buckmaster, and their staffs, had acquired the first-hand experience needed in organizing and launching a full strike against an enemy force in the Coral Sea, but there was no time to pass these lessons on to Enterprise, commanded by Captain George Murray, and Hornet, commanded by Captain Marc Mitscher, which were tasked with launching the first strike. Spruance ordered the striking aircraft to proceed to target immediately rather than waiting for the strike force to assemble, since neutralizing the Japanese carriers was the key to the survival of his own task force.

While the Japanese were able to launch 108 aircraft in just seven minutes, it took Enterprise and Hornet over an hour to launch 117. Spruance judged that the need to throw something at the Japanese as soon as possible was greater than that of coordinating the attack by aircraft of different types and speeds (fighters, bombers, and torpedo bombers). Accordingly, American squadrons were launched piecemeal and proceeded to the target in several different groups. It was accepted that the lack of coordination would diminish the overall impact of the American attacks and increase their casualties, but Spruance calculated that this was worthwhile, since keeping the Japanese under aerial attack impaired their ability to launch a counter strike (Japanese tactics preferred fully constituted attacks), and he gambled that he would find Nagumo with his flight decks at their most vulnerable.

American carrier aircraft had difficulty locating the target, despite the positions they had been given. The strike from Hornet, led by Commander Stanhope C. Ring, followed an incorrect heading of 265 degrees rather than the 240 degrees indicated by the contact report. As a result, Air Group Eight's dive bombers missed the Japanese carriers: the 10 F4Fs from Hornet ran out of fuel and had to ditch. This became known as the Flight to Nowhere. Torpedo Squadron 8 (VT-8, from Hornet), led by Lieutenant Commander John C. Waldron, however, broke formation from Ring and followed the correct heading.

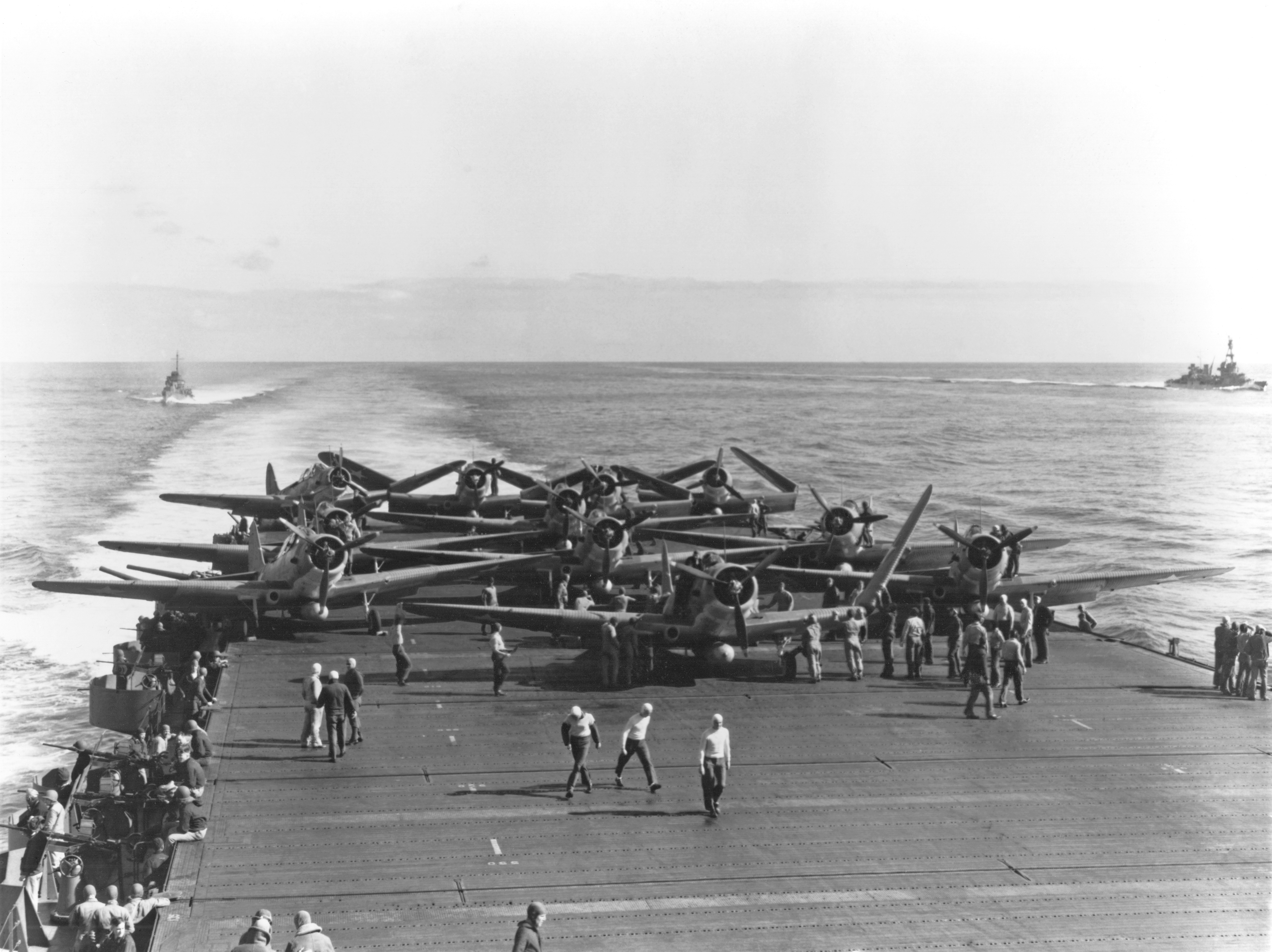
Devastators of VT-6 aboard USS Enterprise being prepared for takeoff during the battle

Waldron's squadron sighted the Japanese carriers and began attacking at 09:20, followed at 09:40 by VF-6 from Enterprise, whose Wildcat fighter escorts lost contact, ran low on fuel, and had to turn back. Without fighter escort, all 15 TBD Devastators of VT-8 were shot down without being able to inflict any damage. Ensign George H. Gay, Jr. was the only survivor of the 30 aircrew of VT-8. He launched his torpedo on Sōryū before he was shot down, but Sōryū evaded it. VT-6, led by Lieutenant Commander Eugene E. Lindsey, lost 9 of its 14 Devastators (one ditched later), and 10 of 12 Devastators from Yorktown's VT-3 (who attacked at 10:10) were shot down with no hits to show for their effort, thanks in part to the abysmal performance of their unimproved Mark 13 torpedoes. The TBD Devastator had shown itself to be unsuitable for modern warfare and it was to be replaced by the TBF Avenger.

The Japanese combat air patrol, flying Zeros, made short work of the unescorted, slow, under-armed TBDs. A few TBDs managed to get within a few ship-lengths range of their targets before dropping their torpedoes—close enough to be able to strafe the Japanese ships and force their carriers to make sharp evasive maneuvers—but all of their torpedoes either missed or failed to explode. The performance of American torpedoes early in the war was extremely poor, as shot after shot missed by running directly under the target (deeper than intended), prematurely exploded, or failed to explode at all. Remarkably, senior Navy and Bureau of Ordnance officers never questioned why half a dozen torpedoes, released so close to the Japanese carriers, produced no results whatsoever.

Despite their failure to score any hits, the American torpedo attacks achieved three important results. First, they kept the Japanese carriers off balance and unable to prepare and launch their own counter strike. Second, the poor control of the Japanese CAP meant they were out of position for subsequent attacks. Third, many of the Zeros ran low on ammunition and fuel. The appearance at 10:00 of a third torpedo plane attack from the southeast by VT-3 from Yorktown, led by Lieutenant Commander Lance Edward Massey, quickly drew the majority of the Japanese CAP to the southeast quadrant of the fleet. Better discipline and the employment of a greater number of Zeros for the CAP might have enabled Nagumo to prevent (or at least mitigate) the damage caused by the coming American attacks.

By chance, at the same time VT-3 was sighted by the Japanese, three squadrons of SBDs from Enterprise and Yorktown were approaching from the southwest and northeast. The Yorktown squadron (VB-3) had flown just behind VT-3 but elected to attack from a different course. The two squadrons from Enterprise (VB-6 and VS-6) were running low on fuel because of the time spent looking for the Japanese ships. Air Group Commander C. Wade McClusky, Jr. decided to continue the search and, by good fortune, spotted the wake of the Japanese destroyer Arashi. Arashi was steaming at full speed to rejoin Nagumo's carriers after having unsuccessfully depth-charged U.S. submarine Nautilus, which had in turn, unsuccessfully attacked the battleship Kirishima. Some bombers were lost from fuel exhaustion before the attack commenced.

McClusky's choice to persist with the search and his judgment, in the opinion of Admiral Chester Nimitz, "decided the fate of our carrier task force and our forces at Midway…" All three American dive-bomber squadrons (VB-6, VS-6, and VB-3) arrived almost simultaneously at the perfect time, locations and altitudes to attack. Most of the Japanese CAP was directing its attention to the torpedo planes of VT-3 and was out of position; meanwhile, armed Japanese strike aircraft filled the hangar decks, fuel hoses snaked across the decks for hasty refueling, and the repeated change of ordnance meant that bombs and torpedoes were stacked around the hangars, rather than stowed safely in the magazines, rendering the Japanese carriers disastrously vulnerable.

==== Destruction of Kaga, Sōryū and Akagi ====
Beginning at 10:22, the two squadrons of Enterprise's air group split up with the intention of sending one squadron each to attack Kaga and Akagi. A miscommunication caused both of the squadrons to dive at Kaga. Recognizing the error, Lieutenant Richard Halsey Best and his two wingmen were able to pull out of their dives and, after judging that Kaga was doomed, headed north to attack Akagi. Coming under an onslaught of bombs from almost two full squadrons, Kaga sustained three to five direct hits, which caused heavy damage and ignited multiple conflagrations. One of the bombs landed on or right in front of the bridge, killing Captain Jisaku Okada and most of the ship's senior officers. Lieutenant Clarence E. Dickinson, part of McClusky's group, recalled:

We were coming down in all directions on the port side of the carrier… I recognized her as the Kaga; and she was enormous…. The target was utterly satisfying… I saw a bomb hit just behind where I was aiming… I saw the deck rippling and curling back in all directions exposing a great section of the hangar below… I saw [my] 500 lb [230 kg] bomb hit right abreast of the [carrier's] island. The two 100 lb [45 kg] bombs struck in the forward area of the parked planes…

Several minutes later, Best and his two wingmen dived on Akagi. Mitsuo Fuchida, the Japanese aviator who had led the attack on Pearl Harbor, was on Akagi when it was hit, and described the attack:

A look-out screamed: "Hell-Divers!" I looked up to see three black enemy planes plummeting towards our ship. Some of our machineguns managed to fire a few frantic bursts at them, but it was too late. The plump silhouettes of the American Dauntless dive-bombers quickly grew larger, and then a number of black objects suddenly floated eerily from their wings.

Although Akagi sustained only one direct hit (almost certainly dropped by Lieutenant Best), it proved to be a fatal blow: the bomb struck the edge of the mid-ship deck elevator and penetrated to the upper hangar deck, where it exploded among the armed and fueled aircraft in the vicinity. Nagumo's chief of staff, Ryūnosuke Kusaka, recorded "a terrific fire… bodies all over the place…0 Planes stood tail up, belching livid flames and jet-black smoke, making it impossible to bring the fires under control." Another bomb exploded underwater very close astern; the resulting geyser bent the flight deck upward "in grotesque configurations" and caused crucial rudder damage. (Note: Other sources claim a stern hit, but Parshall and Tully make a case for a near miss, because of rudder damage from a high explosive bomb.)

Simultaneously, Yorktown's VB-3, commanded by Lieutenant Max Leslie, went for Sōryū, scoring at least three hits and causing extensive damage. Gasoline ignited, creating an inferno, while stacked bombs and ammunition detonated. VT-3 targeted Hiryū, which was hemmed in by Sōryū, Kaga, and Akagi, but achieved no hits.

Within six minutes, Sōryū and Kaga were ablaze from stem to stern. Akagi, having been struck by only one bomb, took longer to burn, but the resulting fires quickly expanded and proved impossible to extinguish; she too was eventually consumed by flames and had to be abandoned. Although Nagumo was reluctant to leave Akagi, Kusaka was able to persuade him. At 10:46, Nagumo transferred his flag to the light cruiser Nagara. All three carriers remained temporarily afloat, as none had suffered damage below the waterline, other than the rudder damage to Akagi caused by the near miss close astern. Despite initial hopes that Akagi could be saved or at least towed back to Japan, all three carriers were eventually abandoned and scuttled. (Note: Parshall and Tully argue that even if Kaga had been towed back to Japan, the permanent structural damage caused by the inferno on board would likely have made the carrier unusable for anything except scrapping.) While Kaga was burning, Nautilus showed up again and launched three torpedoes at her, scoring one dud hit. Kaga was later sunk by the Japanese destroyer Hagikaze.

=== Japanese counterattacks ===
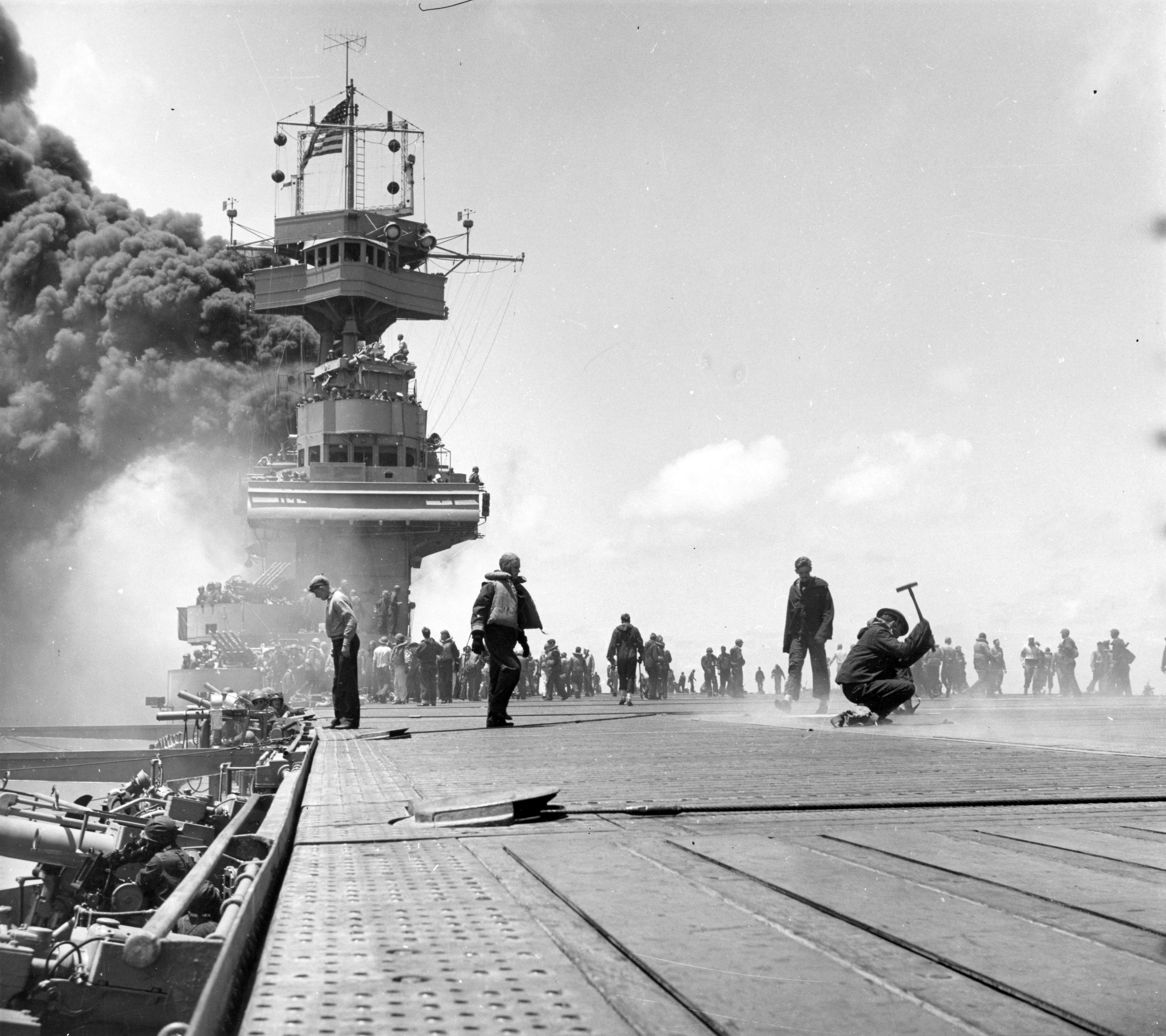
Yorktown shortly after being hit by three Japanese bombs

Hiryū, the sole surviving Japanese aircraft carrier, wasted little time in counterattacking. Hiryū's first attack wave, consisting of 18 D3As and 6 Zeros, followed the retreating American aircraft and attacked the first carrier they encountered, Yorktown, hitting her with three bombs, which blew a hole in the deck, snuffed out all but one of her boilers, and destroyed one anti-aircraft mount. The damage forced Fletcher to move his command staff to the heavy cruiser Astoria. Damage control parties were able to temporarily patch the flight deck and restore power to several boilers within an hour, giving her a speed of 19 kn (35 km/h; 22 mph) and enabling her to resume air operations. Yorktown hoisted a flag signal to indicate a speed of 5 knots. Captain Buckmaster had his signalmen hoist a new 10-by-15-foot American flag from the foremast. Thirteen D3As and three Zeros were lost in this attack (two Zeros turned back early after they were damaged attacking some of Enterprise's SBDs returning from their attack on the Japanese carriers).

Approximately one hour later, Hiryū's second attack wave, consisting of ten B5Ns and six escorting Zeros, arrived over Yorktown; the repair efforts had been so effective that the Japanese pilots assumed that Yorktown must be a different, undamaged carrier. They attacked, crippling Yorktown with two torpedoes; she lost all power and developed a 23-degree list to port. Five B5Ns and two Zeros were shot down in this attack.

News of the two strikes, with the mistaken reports that each had sunk an American carrier, greatly improved Japanese morale. The few surviving aircraft were all recovered aboard Hiryū. Despite the heavy losses, the Japanese believed that they could scrape together enough aircraft for one more strike against what they believed to be the only remaining American carrier.

=== American counterattack ===
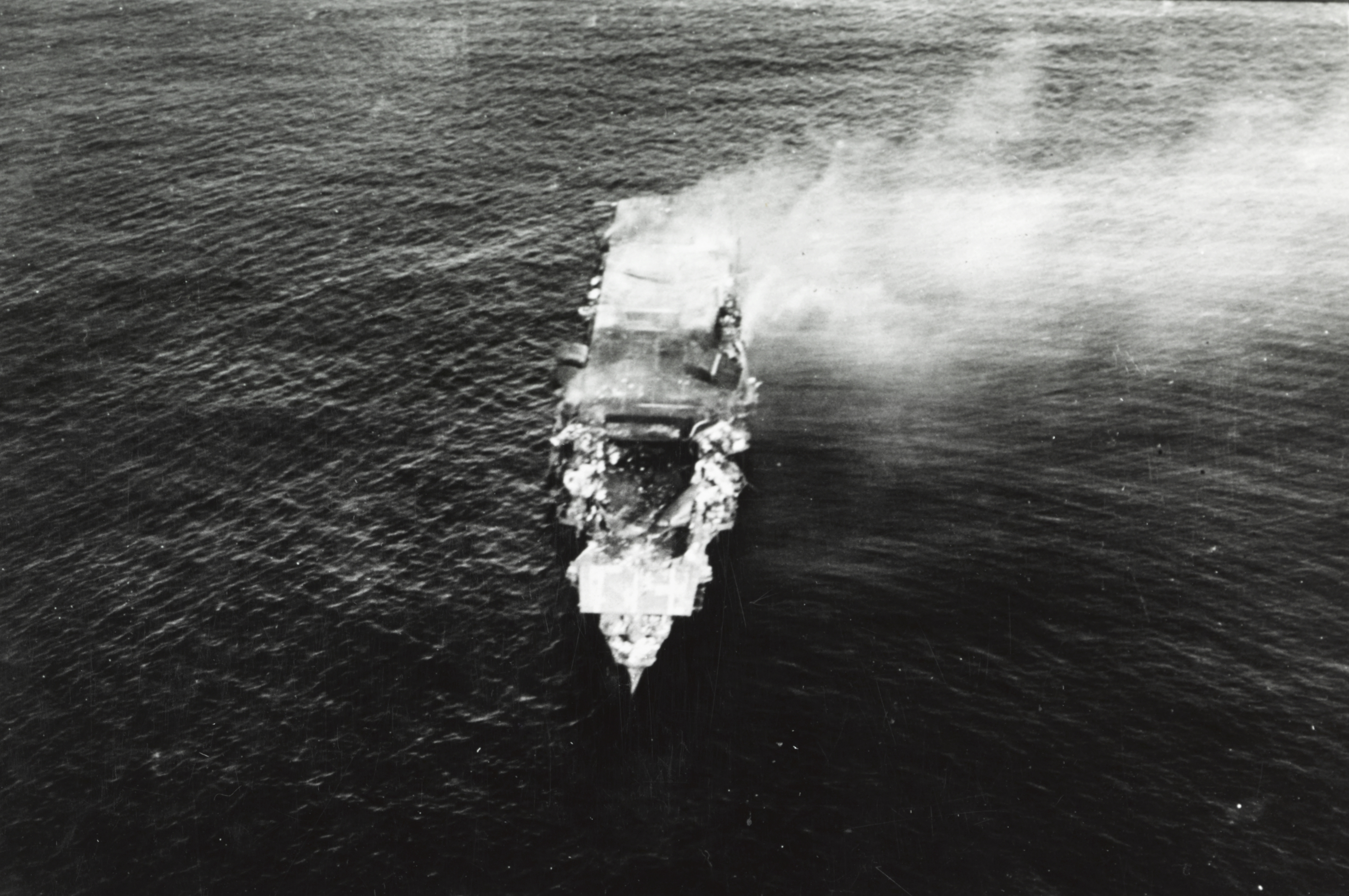
Hiryū, shortly before sinking, photo taken by a Yokosuka B4Y off the carrier Hōshō

Late in the afternoon, a Yorktown scout aircraft located Hiryū, prompting Enterprise to launch a final strike of 24 dive bombers (six SBDs from VS-6, four SBDs from VB-6, and 14 SBDs from Yorktown's VB-3). Despite Hiryū being defended by more than a dozen Zero fighters, the attack by Enterprise and orphaned Yorktown aircraft launched from Enterprise was successful: four bombs (possibly five) hit Hiryū, leaving her ablaze and unable to operate aircraft. Hornet's strike, launched late because of a communications error, concentrated on the remaining escort ships but failed to score any hits. A bomb from the Enterprise dive bomber piloted by Dusty Kleiss struck Hiryū on the bow, essentially crippling her.

After futile attempts at controlling the blaze, most of the crew on Hiryū were evacuated, and the remainder of the fleet continued sailing northeast in an attempt to intercept the American carriers. Despite a scuttling attempt by a Japanese destroyer that hit her with a torpedo and then departed quickly, Hiryū stayed afloat for several more hours. She was discovered early the next morning by an aircraft from the escort carrier Hōshō, prompting hopes she could be saved or towed back to Japan. Soon after being spotted, Hiryū sank. Yamaguchi, along with ship's captain, Tomeo Kaku, chose to go down with the ship, costing Japan perhaps its best carrier officer. One young sailor reportedly tried to stay with the officers but was denied.

As darkness fell, both sides made tentative plans for continuing the action. Fletcher, obliged to abandon the derelict Yorktown and feeling he could not adequately command from a cruiser, ceded operational command to Spruance. Spruance knew the U.S. had won a great victory, but he was unsure of what Japanese forces remained and was determined to safeguard both Midway and his carriers. To aid his aviators, who had launched at extreme range, he had continued to close with Nagumo during the day and persisted as night fell.

Finally, fearing a possible night encounter with Japanese surface forces and believing Yamamoto still intended to invade (based in part on a misleading contact report from the submarine Tambor) Spruance changed course and withdrew to the east, turning back west towards the Japanese at midnight. For his part, Yamamoto initially decided to continue the engagement and sent his remaining surface forces searching eastward for the American carriers. Simultaneously, he detached a cruiser raiding force to bombard the island. The Japanese surface forces failed to make contact with the Americans because Spruance had briefly withdrawn eastward, and Yamamoto ordered a general withdrawal to the west. It was fortunate for the U.S. that Spruance did not pursue: had he come in contact with Yamamoto's heavy ships, including Yamato, in the dark, considering the Japanese Navy's superiority in night-attack tactics at the time, there is a very high probability his cruisers would have been overwhelmed and his carriers sunk.

Spruance failed to reestablish contact with Yamamoto's forces on 5 June, despite extensive searches. Towards the end of the day, he launched a search-and-destroy mission to seek out any remnants of Nagumo's carrier force. This late afternoon strike narrowly missed detecting Yamamoto's main body and failed to score hits on a straggling Japanese destroyer. The strike planes returned to the carriers after nightfall, prompting Spruance to order Enterprise and Hornet to turn on their lights to aid the landings.

At 02:15 on 5 June Commander John Murphy's Tambor, lying 90 nmi (170 km; 100 mi) west of Midway, made the second of the submarine force's two major contributions to the battle's outcome, although its impact was heavily blunted by Murphy. Sighting several ships, neither Murphy nor his executive officer, Edward Spruance (son of Admiral Spruance), could identify them. Uncertain of whether they were friendly and unwilling to approach any closer to verify their heading or type, Murphy decided to send a vague report of "four large ships" to Admiral Robert English, Commander, Submarine Force, Pacific Fleet. This report was passed on by English to Nimitz, who then sent it to Spruance. Spruance, a former submarine commander, was "understandably furious" at the vagueness of Murphy's report, as it provided him with little more than suspicion and no concrete information on which to make his preparations. Unaware of the exact location of Yamamoto's "Main Body" (a persistent problem since the time PBYs had first sighted the Japanese), Spruance was forced to assume the "four large ships" reported by Tambor represented the main invasion force and so he moved to block it, while staying 100 nmi (190 km; 120 mi) northeast of Midway.

In reality, the ships sighted by Tambor were the detachment of four cruisers and two destroyers Yamamoto had sent to bombard Midway. At 02:55 these ships received Yamamoto's order to retire and changed course to comply. At about the same time as this change of course, Tambor was sighted and during maneuvers designed to avoid a submarine attack, the heavy cruisers Mogami and Mikuma collided, inflicting serious damage on Mogami's bow. The less severely damaged Mikuma slowed to 12 kn (22 km/h; 14 mph) to keep pace. Only at 04:12 did the sky brighten enough for Murphy to be certain the ships were Japanese, by which time staying surfaced was hazardous and he dived to approach for an attack. The attack was unsuccessful, and around 06:00 he finally reported two westbound Mogami-class cruisers before diving again and playing no further role in the battle. Limping along on a straight course at 12 knots—roughly one-third their top speed—Mogami and Mikuma had been almost perfect targets for a submarine attack. As soon as Tambor returned to port, Spruance had Murphy relieved of duty and reassigned to a shore station, citing his confusing contact report, poor torpedo shooting during his attack run, and general lack of aggression, especially as compared to Nautilus, the oldest of the 12 boats at Midway and the only one which had, despite being a dud after all, successfully placed a torpedo on target.

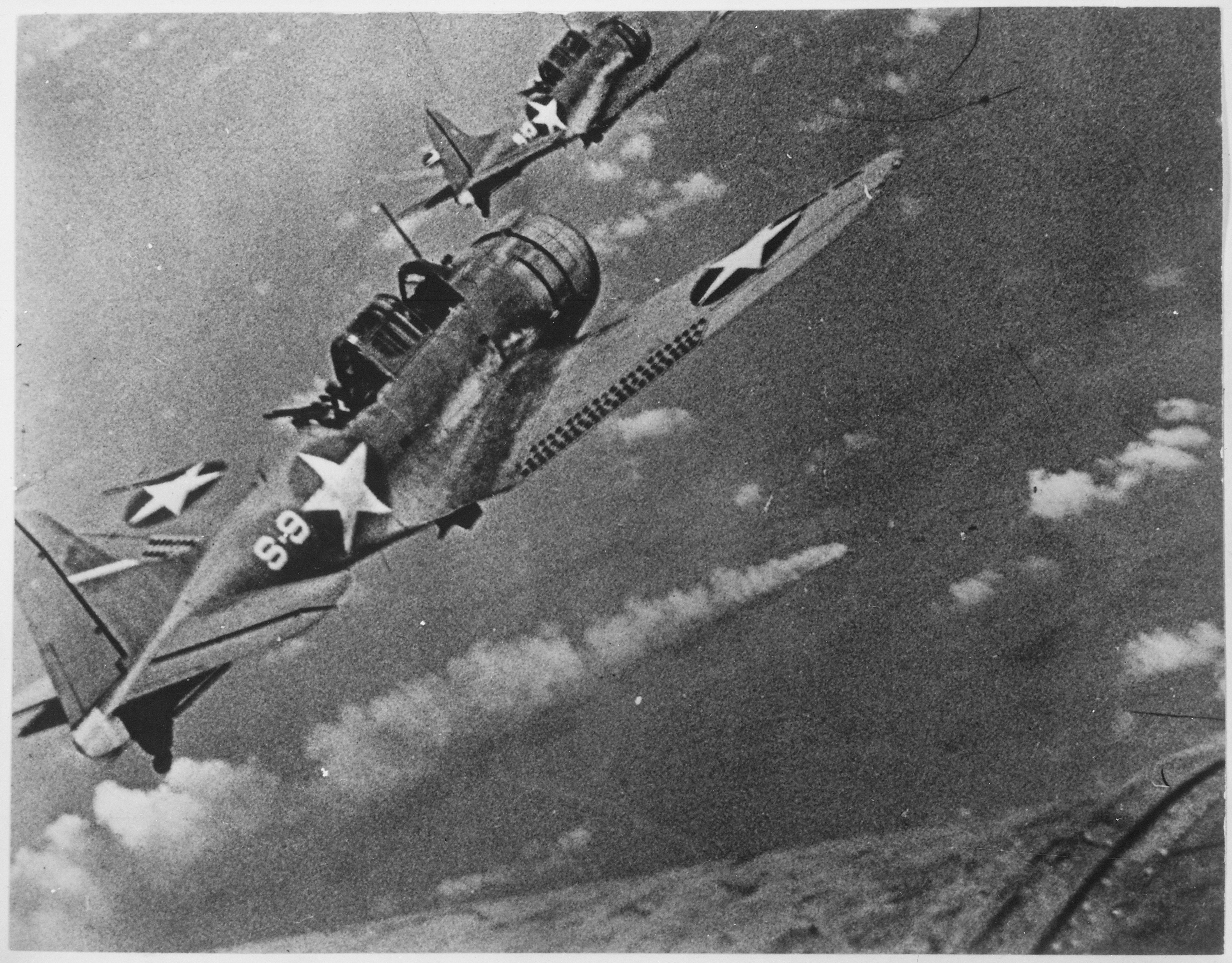
SBD Dauntless dive bombers from Scouting Squadron 8 (VS-8) aboard USS Hornet approach the burning heavy cruiser Mikuma on 6 June

Over the next two days, several strikes were launched against the stragglers, first from Midway, then from Spruance's carriers. Mikuma was eventually sunk by Dauntlesses, while Mogami survived further severe damage to return home for repairs. The destroyers Arashio and Asashio were also bombed and strafed during the last of these attacks. Captain Richard E. Fleming, a U.S. Marine Corps aviator, was killed while executing a daring bomb run on Mikuma and was posthumously awarded the Medal of Honor.

Meanwhile, salvage efforts on Yorktown were encouraging, and she was taken in tow by fleet tug USS Vireo. In the late afternoon of 6 June the Japanese submarine I-168, which had managed to slip through the cordon of destroyers (possibly because of the large amount of debris in the water), fired a salvo of torpedoes, two of which struck Yorktown. There were few casualties aboard since most of the crew had already been evacuated, but a third torpedo from this salvo struck the destroyer USS Hammann, which had been providing auxiliary power to Yorktown. Hammann broke in two and sank with the loss of 80 lives, mostly because her own depth charges exploded. With further salvage efforts deemed hopeless, the remaining repair crews were evacuated from Yorktown. Throughout the night of 6 June and into the morning of 7 June, Yorktown remained afloat, but by 05:30 on 7 June, her list rapidly increased to port. Shortly afterward, the ship turned onto her port side. At 07:01, Yorktown capsized and sank.

=== Japanese and U.S. casualties ===
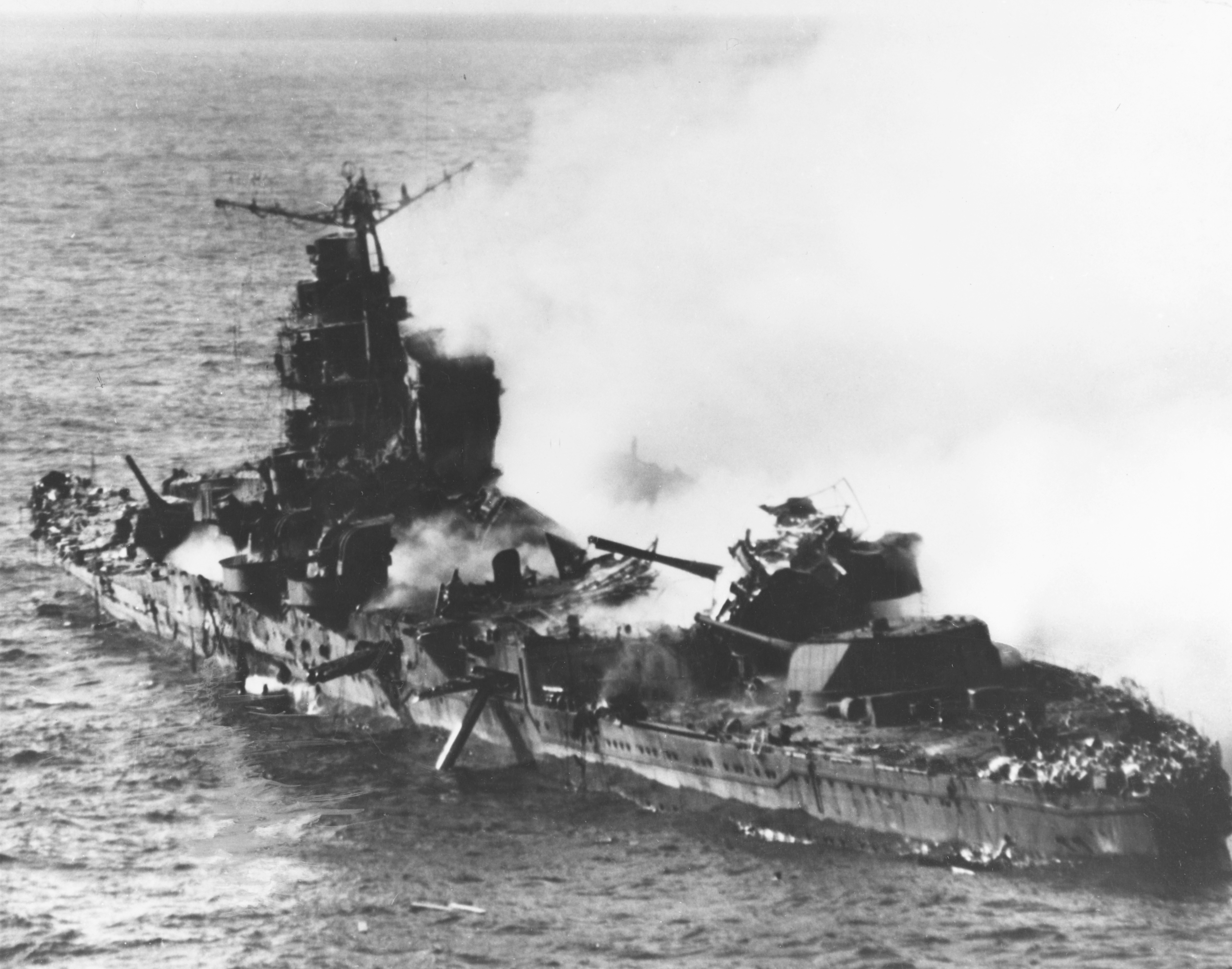
Mikuma shortly before sinking

SBD pilot Norman "Dusty" Kleiss, who scored three hits on Japanese ships during the Battle of Midway (aircraft carriers Kaga and Hiryū and heavy cruiser Mikuma), wrote: "From the experience in the Marshalls, at Wake and at Marcus, I thought our fleet learned its lessons. We could not send TBDs into action unless they had adequate smoke protection and torpedoes that exploded more than 10 percent of the time."

By the time the battle ended, 3,057 Japanese had died. Casualties aboard the four carriers were: Akagi: 267; Kaga: 811; Hiryū: 392 (including Yamaguchi who chose to go down with his ship); Soryū: 711 (including Captain Yanagimoto, who chose to remain on board); a total of 2,181. The heavy cruisers Mikuma (sunk; 700 casualties) and Mogami (badly damaged; 92) accounted for another 792 deaths.

In addition, the destroyers Arashio (bombed; 35) and Asashio (strafed by aircraft; 21) were both damaged during the air attacks which sank Mikuma and caused further damage to Mogami. Floatplanes were lost from the cruisers Chikuma (3) and Tone (2). Dead aboard the destroyers Tanikaze (11), Arashi (1), Kazagumo (1) and the fleet oiler Akebono Maru (10) made up the remaining 23 casualties. (Note: Japanese casualty figures for the battle were compiled by Sawaichi Hisae for her book Middowei Kaisen: Kiroku, p. 550: the list was compiled from Japanese prefectural records and is the most accurate to date.)

At the end of the battle, the U.S. lost the carrier Yorktown and the destroyer Hammann. Three hundred seven Americans had been killed, including Major General Clarence L. Tinker, Commander, 7th Air Force, who personally led a bomber strike from Hawaii against the retreating Japanese forces on 7 June. He was killed when his aircraft crashed near Midway Island.

== Aftermath ==
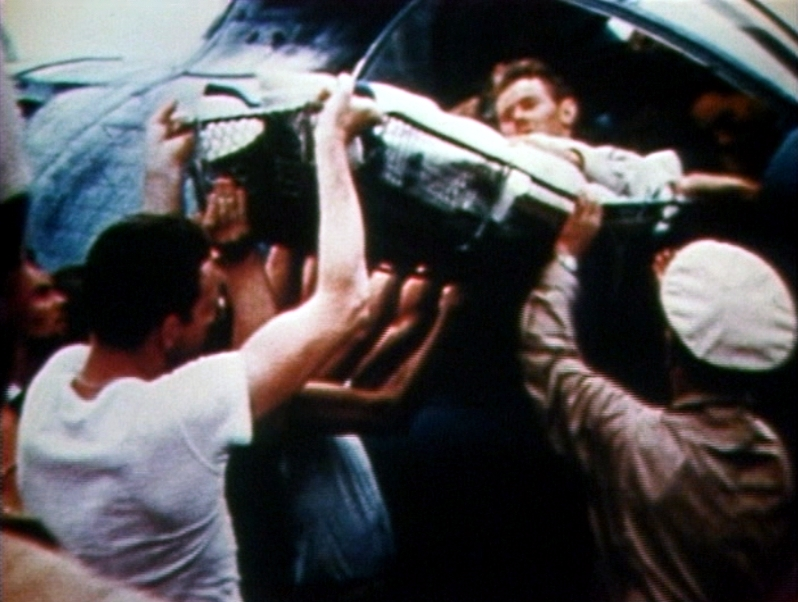
A rescued U.S. aviator on Midway.

After securing a clear victory, and as pursuit became too hazardous near Wake Island, American forces retired. Spruance again withdrew to the east to refuel his destroyers and rendezvous with the carrier Saratoga, which was ferrying much-needed replacement aircraft. Fletcher transferred his flag to Saratoga on the afternoon of 8 June and resumed command of the carrier force. For the remainder of that day and the next, Fletcher continued to launch search missions from the three carriers to ensure the Japanese were no longer advancing on Midway. Late on 10 June a decision was ultimately made to leave the area, and the American carriers returned to Pearl Harbor.

Historian Samuel E. Morison noted in 1949 that Spruance was criticized for not pursuing the retreating Japanese, allowing their surface fleet to escape. Clay Blair argued in 1975 that had Spruance pressed on, he would have been unable to launch his aircraft after nightfall, and his cruisers would have been overwhelmed by Yamamoto's powerful surface units, including Yamato. Furthermore, the American air groups had suffered considerable losses, including most of their torpedo bombers. This made it unlikely that they would be effective in an airstrike against the Japanese battleships, even if they had managed to catch them during the daytime. Also, Spruance's destroyers were critically low on fuel.

On 10 June the Imperial Japanese Navy conveyed to the military liaison conference an incomplete picture of the results of the battle. Nagumo's detailed battle report was submitted to the high command on 15 June. It was intended only for the highest echelons in the Japanese Navy and government and was guarded closely throughout the war. In it, one of the more striking revelations is the comment on Mobile Force Commander Nagumo's estimates: "The enemy is not aware of our plans (we were not discovered until early in the morning of the 5th at the earliest)." In reality, the whole operation had been compromised from the beginning by American code-breaking efforts.

The Japanese public and much of the military command structure were kept in the dark about the extent of the defeat: Japanese news announced a great victory. Only Emperor Hirohito and the highest Navy command staff were accurately informed of the carrier and personnel losses. Consequently, even the Imperial Japanese Army continued to believe, for at least a short time, that the fleet was in good condition.

On the return of the Japanese fleet to Hashirajima on 14 June the wounded were immediately transferred to naval hospitals; most were classified as "secret patients", placed in isolation wards and quarantined from other patients and their own families to keep this major defeat secret. The remaining officers and men were quickly dispersed to other units of the fleet and, facing similar bans from visiting family or friends, were shipped to units in the South Pacific, where the majority died in battle. None of the flag officers or staff of the Combined Fleet were penalized, and Nagumo was later placed in command of the rebuilt carrier force. A possible reason Nagumo was not relieved of command was that he reported two American carriers had been sunk; not that only one sank.

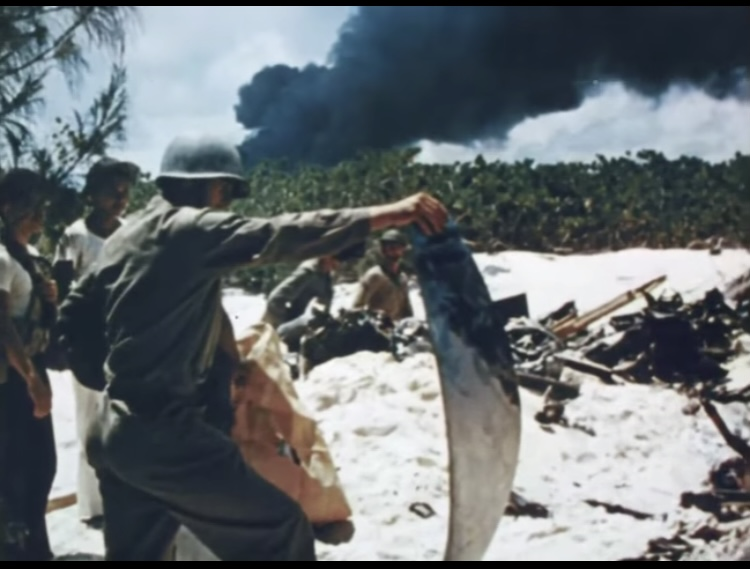
In this still from the 1942 U.S. Navy film The Battle of Midway, shot by John Ford, soldiers and civilians inspect the wreckage of a plane while black smoke billows in the distance

As a result of the defeat, new procedures were adopted whereby more Japanese aircraft were refueled and re-armed on the flight deck rather than in the hangars, and the practice of draining all unused fuel lines was adopted. The new carriers being built were redesigned to incorporate only two flight deck elevators and new firefighting equipment. More carrier crew members were trained in damage-control and firefighting techniques, although the losses of the Shōkaku, Hiyō, and especially Taihō later in the war suggest that problems in this area nonetheless remained.

Japanese replacement pilots were pushed through an abbreviated training regimen to meet the short-term needs of the fleet, leading to a sharp decline in the quality of the aviators produced. These inexperienced airmen were fed into front-line units, while the veterans who remained after Midway and the Solomons campaign were forced to share an increased workload as conditions grew more desperate, with few being given a chance to rest in rear areas or in the home islands. As a result, Japanese naval air groups as a whole progressively deteriorated during the war while their American adversaries continued to improve.

=== American prisoners ===
Three U.S. aviators were captured during the battle: Ensign Wesley Osmus, a pilot from Yorktown; Ensign Frank O'Flaherty, a pilot from Enterprise; and Aviation Machinist's Mate Bruno Peter Gaido, O'Flaherty's gunner. Osmus was held on Arashi; O'Flaherty and Gaido on the cruiser Nagara (or destroyer Makigumo, sources vary); O'Flaherty and Gaido were interrogated and then tied to water-filled kerosene cans and thrown overboard to drown. Osmus was murdered on the Arashi. The report filed by Nagumo tersely states that Osmus, "died on 6 June and was buried at sea"; O'Flaherty and Gaido's fates were not mentioned. The execution of Osmus was apparently ordered by Arashi's captain, Watanabe Yasumasa. Watanabe died when the destroyer Numakaze sank in December 1943; had he survived the war he would have likely been tried as a war criminal.

=== Japanese prisoners ===
Two enlisted men from Mikuma were rescued from a life raft on 9 June by USS Trout and taken to Pearl Harbor. After receiving medical care, at least one of these sailors cooperated during interrogation and provided intelligence. Another 35 crewmen from Hiryū were taken from a lifeboat by USS Ballard on 19 June after being spotted by an American search plane. They were taken to Midway and then transferred to Pearl Harbor on USS Sirius.

== Impact ==
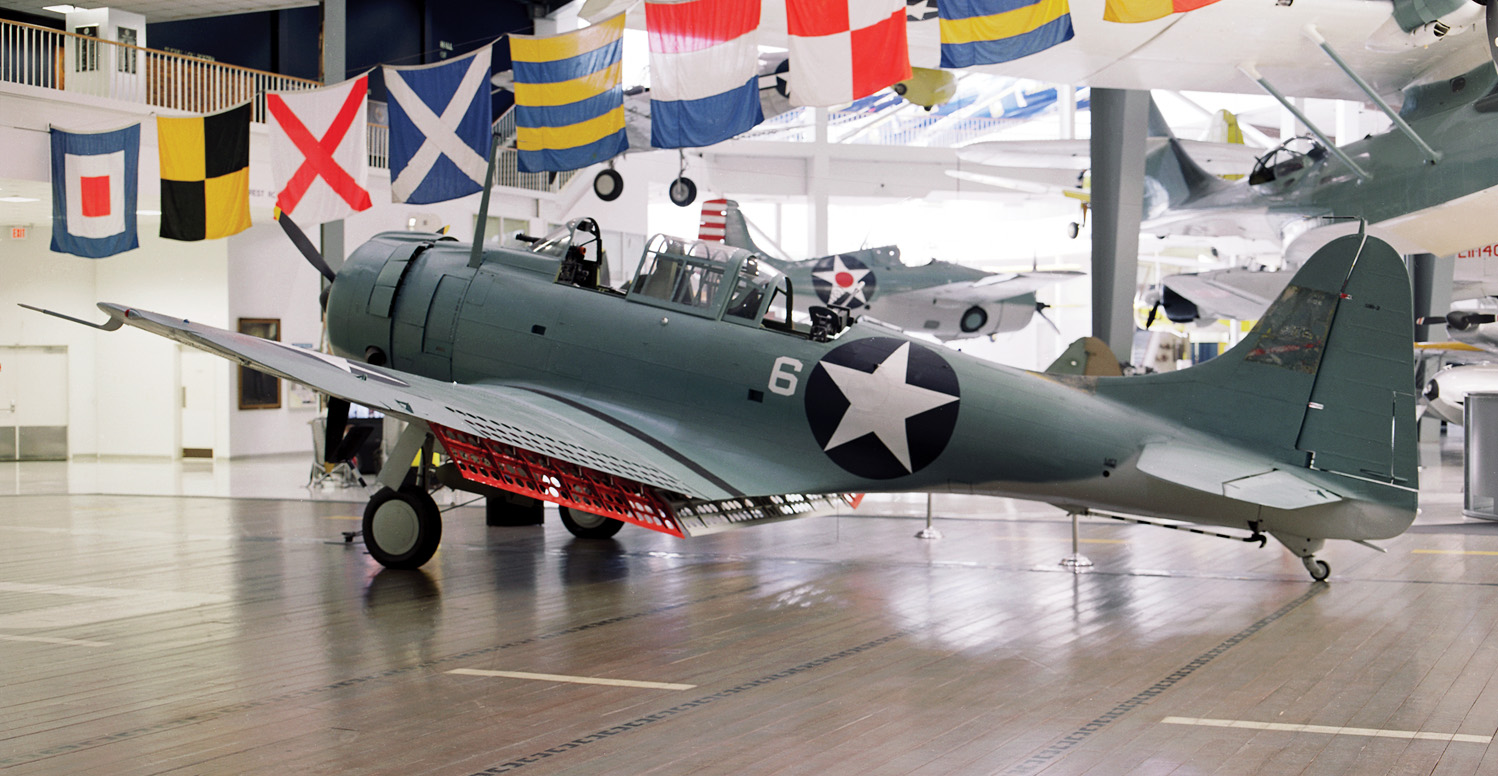
This SBD-2 was one of sixteen dive bombers of VMSB-241 launched from Midway on the morning of 4 June. Holed 219 times in the attack on the carrier Hiryū, it survives today at the National Naval Aviation Museum at Pensacola, Florida.

The Battle of Midway has often been called "the turning point of the Pacific". It was the Allies' first major naval victory against the Japanese. Had Japan won the battle as thoroughly as the U.S. did, it might have been able to capture Midway Island. Saratoga would have been the only American carrier in the Pacific, as no new ones were completed before the end of 1942. While the U.S. would probably not have sought peace with Japan as Yamamoto hoped, his country might have revived Operation FS to invade and occupy Fiji and Samoa; attacked Australia, Alaska, and Ceylon; or even attempted to occupy Hawaii.

Although the Japanese continued to try to secure more territory, and the U.S. did not move from a state of naval parity to one of supremacy until after several more months of hard combat, Midway allowed the Allies to switch to the strategic initiative, paving the way for the landings on Guadalcanal and the prolonged attrition of the Solomon Islands campaign. Midway allowed this to occur before the first of the new Essex-class fleet carriers became available at the end of 1942. The Guadalcanal campaign is regarded by some as a turning point in the Pacific War.

Some authors have stated that heavy losses in carriers and veteran aircrews at Midway permanently weakened the Imperial Japanese Navy. Parshall and Tully have stated that the heavy losses in veteran aircrew (110, just under 25% of the aircrew embarked on the four carriers) were not crippling to the Japanese naval air corps as a whole; the Japanese navy had 2,000 carrier-qualified aircrews at the start of the Pacific War. The loss of four large fleet carriers and over 40% of the carriers' highly trained aircraft mechanics and technicians, plus the essential flight-deck crews and armorers, and the loss of organizational knowledge embodied in such highly trained crews, were still heavy blows to the Japanese carrier fleet. (Note: Pre-war Japan was less mechanized than America and the highly trained aircraft mechanics, fitters, and technicians lost at Midway were all but impossible to replace and train to a similar level of efficiency. In contrast, the extensive use of machinery in the United States meant that a much larger portion of the population had a mechanical/technical background.) A few months after Midway, the Imperial Japanese Navy Air Service sustained similar casualty rates in the Battle of the Eastern Solomons and Battle of the Santa Cruz Islands, and it was these battles, combined with the constant attrition of veterans during the Solomons campaign, which were the catalyst for the sharp downward spiral in operational capability.

After the battle, Shōkaku and Zuikaku were the only large carriers of the original Pearl Harbor strike force still afloat. Of Japan's other carriers, Taihō, which was not commissioned until early 1944, would be the only fleet carrier worth teaming with Shōkaku and Zuikaku; Ryūjō and Zuihō were light carriers, while Jun'yō and Hiyō, although technically classified as fleet carriers, were second-rate ships of comparatively limited effectiveness. In the time it took Japan to build three carriers, the U.S. Navy commissioned more than two dozen fleet and light fleet carriers, and numerous escort carriers. By 1942 the U.S. was already three years into a shipbuilding program mandated by the 1938 Second Vinson Act.

Both the U.S. and Japan accelerated the training of aircrew, but the U.S. had a more effective pilot rotation system, which meant that more veterans survived and went on to training or command billets, where they were able to pass on lessons they had learned in combat to trainees, instead of remaining in combat, where errors were more likely to be fatal. By the time of the Battle of the Philippine Sea in June 1944, the Japanese had nearly rebuilt their carrier forces in terms of numbers, but their planes, many of which were obsolete, were largely flown by inexperienced and poorly trained pilots. (Note: Shinano, commissioned on 19 November 1944, was the fourth fleet carrier commissioned by Japan during the war, after Taihō, Unryū, and Amagi.)

Midway showed the worth of pre-war naval cryptanalysis and intelligence-gathering. These efforts continued and were expanded throughout the war in both the Pacific and Atlantic theaters. Successes were numerous and significant. For instance, cryptanalysis made possible the shooting down of Admiral Yamamoto's airplane in 1943.

The Battle of Midway also caused the plan of Japan and Nazi Germany to meet up in the Indian subcontinent to be abandoned.

== Discovery of sunken vessels ==
Because of the extreme depth of the ocean in the area of the battle (more than 17,000 ft or 5,200 m), researching the battlefield has presented extraordinary difficulties. On 19 May 1998, Robert Ballard and a team of scientists and Midway veterans from both sides located and photographed Yorktown, which was located 16,650 ft (5,070 m) deep. The ship was remarkably intact for a vessel that had sunk in 1942; much of the original equipment and even the original paint scheme were still visible. Ballard's subsequent search for the Japanese carriers was unsuccessful.

In September 1999, a joint expedition between Nauticos Corp. and the U.S. Naval Oceanographic Office searched for the Japanese aircraft carriers. Using advanced renavigation techniques in conjunction with the ship's log of the submarine USS Nautilus, the expedition located a large piece of wreckage, subsequently identified as having come from the upper hangar deck of Kaga.

The crew of the research vessel RV Petrel, in conjunction with the U.S. Navy, announced on 18 October 2019 that it had found the Japanese carrier Kaga at 17,700 ft (5,400 m). The crew confirmed the discovery of another Japanese carrier, the Akagi, on 21 October 2019. The Akagi was found in the Papahānaumokuākea Marine National Monument in nearly 18,010 ft (5,490 m) of water.

== Remembrances ==
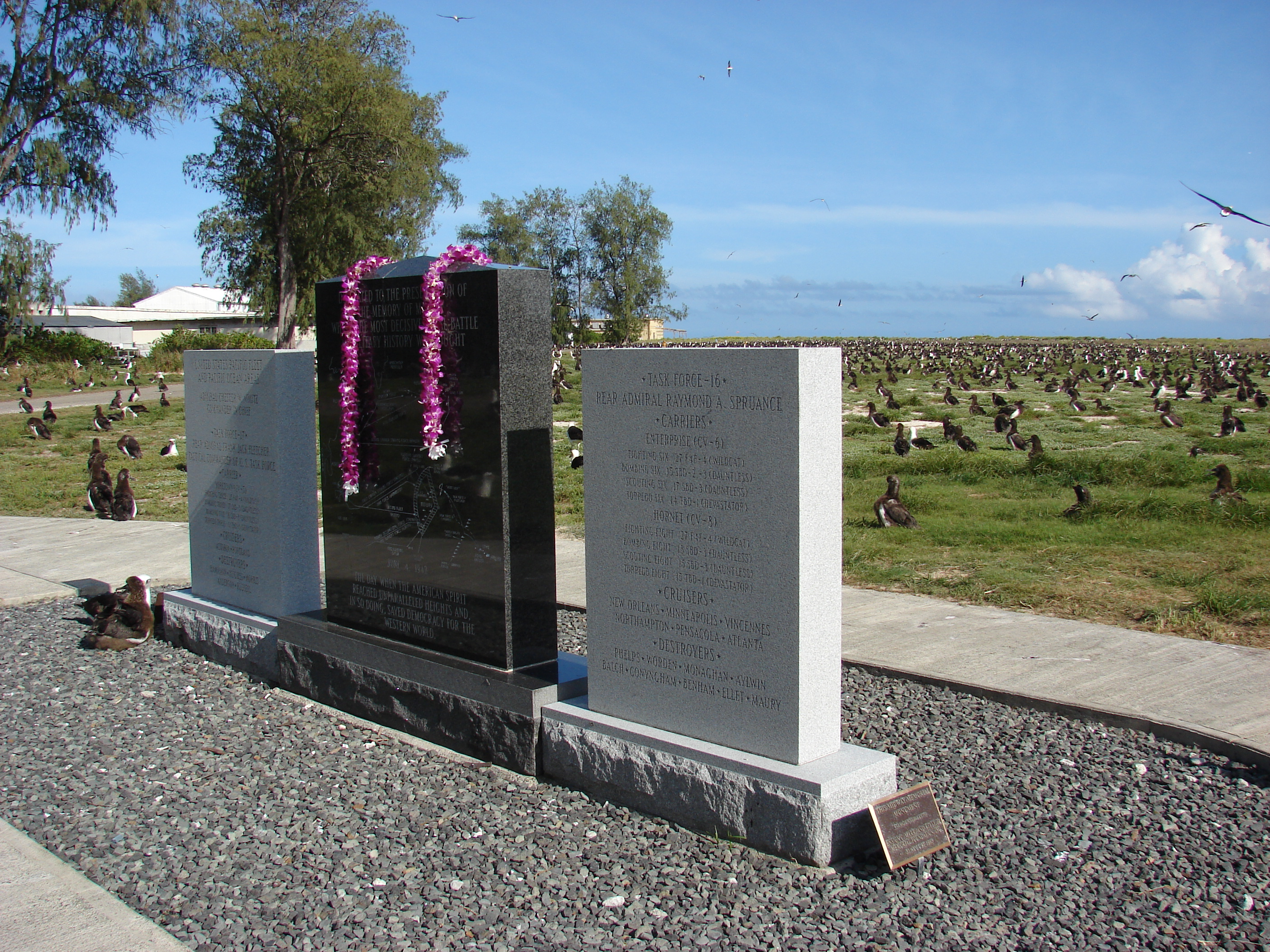
The Midway Memorial

Chicago Municipal Airport, important to the war effort in World War II, was renamed Chicago Midway International Airport (or simply Midway Airport) in 1949 in honor of the battle. Henderson Field in Guadalcanal was named in honor of U.S. Marine Corps Major Lofton Henderson, the first Marine aviator to perish during the battle.

Escort carrier USS Midway (CVE-63) was commissioned on 17 August 1943. She was renamed St. Lo on 10 October 1944 to clear the name Midway for a large fleet aircraft carrier, USS Midway (CV-41), which was commissioned on 10 September 1945, eight days after the Japanese surrender, and is now docked in San Diego, California, as the USS Midway Museum.

On 13 September 2000 Secretary of the Interior Bruce Babbitt designated the lands and waters of Midway Atoll National Wildlife Refuge as the Battle of Midway National Memorial. Tinker Air Force Base outside Oklahoma City, Oklahoma, is named in honor of Major General Clarence L. Tinker, Commander 7th Air Force, who personally led a bomber strike from Hawaii against the retreating Japanese forces on 7 June.

John Ford directed the 18-minute 1942 Movietone News documentary (released by the War Activities Committee) The Battle of Midway, which received the 1942 Academy Award for Best Documentary; and the eight-minute documentary Torpedo Squadron 8, which describes the heroism of Torpedo Squadron 8 of USS Hornet. Ford, who was a Navy Reserve commander at the time, was present at Midway Atoll's power plant on Sand Island during the Japanese attack and filmed it. He was wounded by enemy fire in his arm during the filming.

== See also ==
- First Bombardment of Midway, a 7 December 1941 attack on Midway by two Japanese destroyers
- Imperial Japanese Navy in World War II
- Pacific Theater aircraft carrier operations during World War II
- Films about the battle:
  - Midway (1976)
  - Midway (2019)
  - Dauntless: The Battle of Midway (2019)
- 1942 and 1943: The Battle of Midway, video games centered on the battle
- World War II carrier-versus-carrier engagements between Allied and Japanese naval forces:
  - Battle of the Coral Sea
  - Battle of the Eastern Solomons
  - Battle of the Santa Cruz Islands
  - Battle of the Philippine Sea
  - Battle of Leyte Gulf
