= VMF-221 =

Marine Fighting Squadron 221
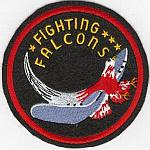
- VMF-221 Insignia
- Active: 11 July 1941 - Sept 10, 1945; 1 April 1946 – 31 October 1965
- Country: United States
- Branch: USMC
- Type: Fighter squadron
- Role: Air interdiction
- Nickname: "Fighting Falcons"
- Engagements: World War II * Battle of Midway * Battle of Guadalcanal * Battle of New Georgia

Commanders
- Notable commanders: Floyd B. Parks

Aircraft flown
- Fighter: F2A-3 Buffalo; F4F Wildcat; F4U Corsair; FJ-4 Fury

Marine Fighting Squadron 221 (VMF-221) was a reserve fighter squadron of the United States Marine Corps. Originally commissioned during the World War II, it flew the Brewster F2A-3, and after reconstitution in 1943, the F4U Corsair. The squadron, also known as the "Fighting Falcons", is most notable for its actions on 4 June 1942, during the Battle of Midway, which resulted in 23 members of the squadron, many posthumously, being awarded the Navy Cross for their actions in combat. VMF-221 ended World War II with 185 air-to-air victories, the second most of any Marine Fighting Squadron in the war.

== History ==
=== World War II ===
==== Organization ====
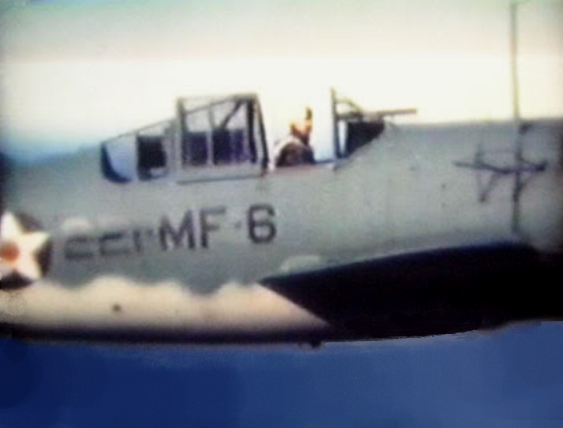
A VMF-221 F2A-3 in flight over NAS North Island, October 1941.

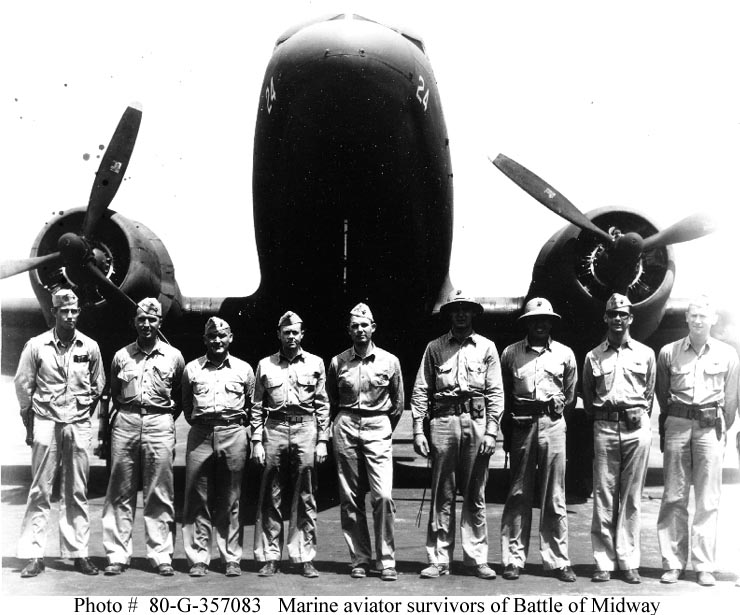
Survivors of the Battle of Midway at Ewa Mooring Mast Field, Oahu on 22 June 1942. From left to right: Capt Marion E. Carl, Capt Kirk Armistead, Maj Raymond Scollin (of Marine Air Group 22), Capt Herbert T. Merrill, 2nd Lt Charles M. Kunz, 2nd Lt Charles S. Hughes, 2nd Lt Hyde Phillips, Capt Philip R. White, and 2nd Lt Roy A. Corry, Jr.

VMF-221 was commissioned on 11 July 1941, in Naval Air Station North Island, San Diego, California. In December of that year, following the attack on Pearl Harbor, the squadron moved to Marine Corps Air Station Ewa, Hawaii. On 25 December 1941, fourteen Brewster F2A-3's landed on Midway Island after launching from the USS Saratoga. These aircraft were originally part of a relief force bound for Wake Island, but were diverted to Midway instead after the force was controversially recalled on 22 December 1941, Wake Island fell on the following day. On 1 March 1942, VMF-221, VMF-222, VMSB-241, and their headquarters units formed Marine Aircraft Group 22 (MAG-22) commanded by Lieutenant Colonel Ira L. Kimes.

The squadron’s first taste of combat came on 10 March 1942, when four of its pilots recorded the first aerial victory flying F2A-3's downing an enemy Kawanishi H8K "Emily" flying boat.

By late May, the squadron was augmented with the arrival of additional aircraft. VMF-221 had 21 F2A-3's and 7 Grumman F4F-3 Wildcats, all of which were essentially worn out "hand-me-downs" from the Navy. Leadership of the squadron was passed to Major Floyd B. Parks, with Kimes taking command of MAG-22. Much has been written of the inferiority of the Brewster fighter, particularly with regard to the Midway engagement. Many of Park's pilots, fresh from flight training Stateside, had very little operational experience. This fact, combined with the overwhelming size and disposition of the Japanese force posed against the atoll's defenses, would have more bearing on the outcome than the operational capabilities of the F2A.

==== Battle of Midway ====
On 4 June 1942, during the Battle of Midway, the pilots of VMF-221 were alerted to intercept the incoming formation of Japanese bombers and the 36 escorting Zero fighters that were headed towards the island. Parks led his squadron against the inbound Japanese armada, which combined air groups from Akagi, Kaga, Hiryu, and Soryu. In the lead were the level bombers, a "vee of vees" made up of Nakajima B5N "Kates", followed by the dive bomber formation of Aichi D3A "Vals" at a slightly higher altitude. The fighter escort was "stepped-up" behind the dive bombers, this disposition gave the pilots of VMF-221 a clear shot at the bombers for the first few passes. Once the Zeros were able to engage the Marine fighters, the tables were effectively turned.

When the smoke of the battle cleared, fourteen of the squadron's aviators, including Parks, had been killed in action; four more had been wounded. Only two of VMF-221's remaining 13 aircraft were serviceable, effectively eliminating the squadron as a viable combat unit. Four of the squadron's ordnancemen were also killed when a Japanese bomb stuck the ammunition area near the airstrip at Midway. For their actions during the Battle, the squadron, as a component of MAG-22, also received a Presidential Unit Citation.

"For conspicuous courage and heroism in combat at Midway Island during June 1942. Outnumbered five to one, Marine Aircraft Group 22 boldly intercepted a heavily escorted enemy bombing force, disrupting their attack and preventing serious damage to island installations. Operating with half of their dive-bomber's obsolete and in poor mechanical conditions, which necessitated vulnerable glide bombing tactics, they succeeded in inflicting heavy damage on Japanese surface units of a large enemy task force. The skill and gallant perseverance of flight and ground personnel of Marine Aircraft Group 22, fighting under tremendously adverse and dangerous conditions were essential factors in the unyielding defense of Midway."

Two VMF-221 aviators would later become aces during the course of the war. 2nd Lt Charles M. Kunz, who had flown a Brewster F2A in Capt Kirk Armistead's division, was later assigned to VMF-224; he would end the war with 8 confirmed aerial victories. Capt Marion E. Carl, who piloted a Grumman F4F Wildcat at Midway, would later fly with VMF-223, running his score to 18.5 kills.

==== Remainder of the War ====
Following the Battle of Midway, the squadron was transferred back to Ewa and was one of three Marine fighting squadrons that made up Marine Aircraft Group 21. As new pilots arrived in Hawaii and additional aircraft became available, the squadron was slowly rebuilt. In January 1943, MAG-21 was notified for deployment and the three squadrons were loaded aboard the USS Nassau and transported to Espiritu Santo. Upon arrival, VMF-214 and VMF-221 sent detachments to Guadalcanal, but VMF-213 was held back and selected to become one of the first squadrons to be equipped with the F4U Corsair. Most of VMF-221's tour at Guadalcanal consisted of combat air patrols over Guadalcanal, but the large raid on 1 April 1943, resulted in Lt James Swett's Medal of Honor action.

After transition to the F4U-1, VMF-221 supported operations during the Battle of Guadalcanal, while also striking Japanese shipping in the vicinity of Bougainville. During the landing on the first day of the Battle of New Georgia, VMF-221 pilots got credit for shooting down 16 Japanese aircraft. In December 1943, they were sent back to the states for another reorganization.

The squadron's final combat deployment was from 24 January 1945 to 6 June 1945, aboard the USS Bunker Hill.

=== Reserve years ===
VMF-221 was reactivated on 1 April 1946, as part of the Marine Corps Reserve. The squadron trained at Naval Air Station Columbus until moving to Naval Air Station Memphis, Tennessee in March 1959. The squadron was eventually decommissioned on 31 October 1965.

== Squadron aces ==
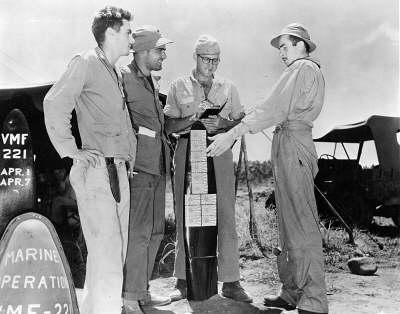
1st Lt. James E. Swett, with other members of his VMF-221 squadron, describing his Medal of Honor actions.

The following members of VMF-221 were credited with at least 5 enemy aircraft shot down:

- Frank B. Baldwin
- Donald Luther Balch
- Dean Caswell
- Albert E Hacking Jr.
- Jack Pittman Jr.
- Nathan T. Post
- Harold E. Segal
- William N. Snider
- James E. Swett

== Other notable members ==
- Marion E. Carl, first Marine Corps ace in World War II
- Albert E. Hacking JR., Became an Ace on his first enemy engagement, credited with 4 confirmed kills, on that mission. Later he would go on to receive 6, Distinguished Flying Crosses, amongst other Medals in WWII, and Korea.
- Harold W. Bauer, Medal of Honor recipient for actions in the later Battle of Guadalcanal

== See also ==
- United States Marine Corps Aviation
- List of decommissioned United States Marine Corps aircraft squadrons
