= Floyd B. Parks =

United States Marine Corps aviator (1911–1942)

Floyd Bruce Parks
- Parks as midshipman in the United States Naval Academy
- Born: January 16, 1911; Salisbury, Missouri, U.S.
- Died: June 4, 1942 (aged 31) near Midway Island †
- Burial place: National Memorial Cemetery of the Pacific
- Military career
- Allegiance: United States
- Branch: United States Navy (1928–1930); United States Marine Corps (1934–1942)
- Service years: 1928–1930; 1934–1942
- Rank: Major
- Nickname: "Red"
- Commands: VMF-221
- Conflicts: World War II; Battle of Midway †
- Awards: Navy Cross; Purple Heart

Floyd Bruce Parks (January 16, 1911 – June 4, 1942) was a United States Marine Corps aviator who commanded Marine Fighting Squadron 221 (VMF-221) at the Battle of Midway, where he was killed in action.

== Early life and education ==
Floyd Bruce Parks was born on January 16, 1911, in Salisbury, Missouri, the first child of James B. Parks and Elizabeth Ann "Bess" Bowman. His father died on February 3, 1924, leaving his mother a widow. Parks enlisted in the United States Navy in 1928 and served for two years aboard destroyers, and he received an appointment to the United States Naval Academy in 1930.

At the academy, Parks played on the water polo team, sang in the Midshipman Choir and took part in class football and swimming. His classmates knew him as "Red", and he received the academy's Black "N" award on several occasions. He graduated in the upper third of the class of 1934 and chose a commission in the Marine Corps.

== Early career ==
Parks was appointed a second lieutenant in the Marine Corps on June 1, 1934. He served at the Philadelphia Navy Yard for a year, and then aboard the heavy cruiser USS Astoria. In May 1936, he reported to Naval Air Station Pensacola for flight training. While swimming in the Gulf of Mexico, he and an enlisted man rescued a Marine private from drowning, and he was commended for his "quick action, good judgment and swimming ability". He was designated a naval aviator on June 12, 1937.

In August 1937, Parks reported to Naval Air Station San Diego, where he served with Marine Bombing Squadron 2 from September 1937 to January 1939, and by October 1939 with Marine Fighting Squadron 2. In June 1940, he returned to Pensacola as a flight instructor. In May 1941, he transferred to the 1st Marine Aircraft Wing at Quantico, Virginia, where he trained as a dive bomber pilot. In March 1942, he joined the 2nd Marine Aircraft Wing at San Diego for deployment to Midway.

== Battle of Midway ==
On May 8, 1942, Parks was promoted to major and given command of Marine Fighting Squadron 221 (VMF-221), part of Marine Aircraft Group 22 at Midway. The squadron was equipped mainly with Brewster F2A-3 Buffalo fighters and a few Grumman F4F-3 Wildcats, and more than half of its pilots were fresh from flight training in San Diego. Parks organized its 21 Buffaloes and seven Wildcats into four Buffalo divisions and one Wildcat division.

Dick Camp writes that Parks may have had a premonition of his death, and that the normally extroverted squadron commander was moody and distracted on the night before the battle. When Captain Kirk Armistead tried to cheer him up by saying, "By this time tomorrow it'll all be over," Parks replied, "Yeah, for those of you who get through it."

On the morning of June 4, 1942, 26 of the squadron's 28 aircraft were operational, and VMF-221 took off to intercept the Japanese carrier aircraft approaching Midway. Flying at 14,000 feet (4,300 m), the pilots with Parks sighted a large formation of Aichi D3A dive bombers about 2,000 feet (610 m) below them and attacked. Camp writes that Parks led off with a five-plane division of Buffaloes against the dive bombers, and that the faster and more maneuverable Zero fighters attacked his unit almost immediately.

Parks was lost in the first part of the action, when his F2A-3, Bureau Number 01518, was shot down by A6M2 Zeros about 30 miles (48 km) northwest of Midway. He bailed out of his burning aircraft, and Camp writes that a Japanese pilot strafed him all the way down as he descended by parachute and kept firing after his body landed on a reef. All the pilots in his division were shot down, and only three of the original twelve pilots in his wider group survived. Of VMF-221's fighters, only ten returned, and 13 F2A-3s and two F4F-3s were missing. He was officially declared dead on June 5, 1943.

== Personal life ==
In 1938, Parks married Margaret Elizabeth Murray of El Paso, Texas. His younger brother, Billy Bowman Parks, was also a naval aviator during the war.

== Awards and honors ==
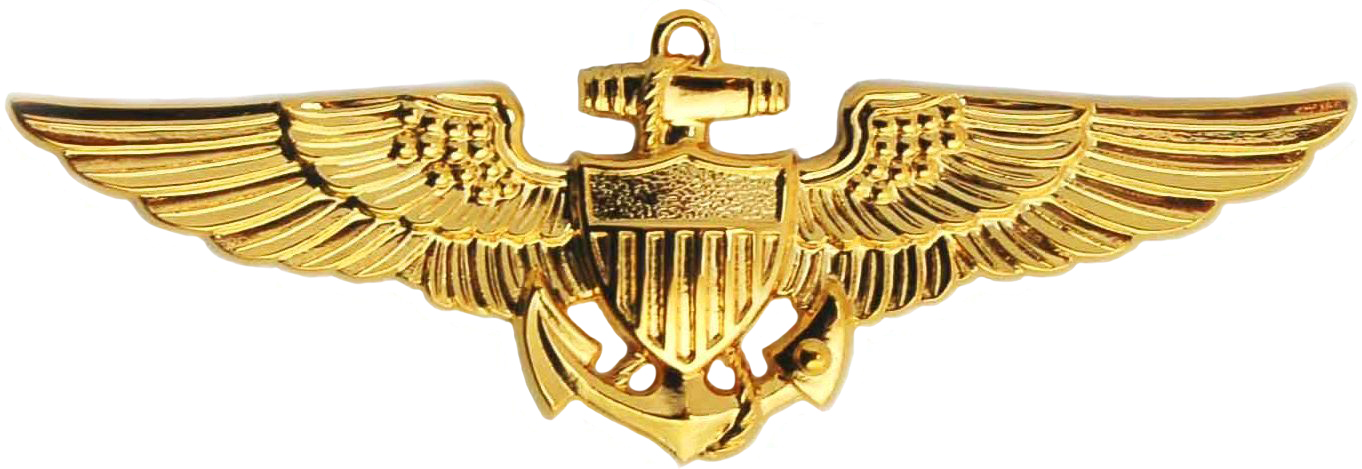

Naval Aviator Badge
Navy Cross
Purple Heart	Navy Presidential Unit Citation	American Defense Service Medal
American Campaign Medal	Asiatic–Pacific Campaign Medal w/ 3/16" bronze star	World War II Victory Medal

=== Navy Cross citation ===
PARKS, FLOYD B.
Major, U.S. Marine Corps
Marine Fighting Squadron TWO HUNDRED TWENTY-ONE (VMF-221), Marine Air Group TWENTY-TWO (MAG-22), Naval Air Station, Midway
Date of Action: June 4, 1942
Citation:
The President of the United States of America takes pride in presenting the Navy Cross (Posthumously) to Major Floyd Bruce Parks (MCSN: 0-5006), United States Marine Corps, for extraordinary heroism and distinguished service in the line of his profession while serving as Squadron Commander and a Pilot in Marine Fighting Squadron TWO HUNDRED TWENTY-ONE (VMF-221), Marine Air Group TWENTY-TWO (MAG-22), Naval Air Station, Midway, during operations of the U.S. Naval and Marine Forces against the invading Japanese Fleet during the Battle of Midway on 4 June 1942. Leading his squadron in a dauntless and aggressive attack against a vastly superior number of Japanese bomber and fighter planes, Major Parks aided in disruption the plans of the enemy and lessening the effectiveness of their attack, thereby contributing materially to the success of our forces. As a result of his courageous and daring tactics and because of the circumstances attendant upon this engagement, there can be little doubt that Major Parks gallantly gave up his life in the service of his country. He displayed the characteristics of a fine leader and excellent airman in keeping with the highest traditions of the United States Naval Service. .

Parks is memorialized on the Courts of the Missing at the Honolulu Memorial in the National Memorial Cemetery of the Pacific, and a memorial marker stands at Salisbury Cemetery in Missouri. In May 1945, a memorial service was held for him in Salisbury, where he was described as the first Salisbury man killed in World War II.

The Gearing-class destroyer USS Floyd B. Parks was named in his honor.
