= Marine Aviation Training Support Group 22 =

Marine Aviation and Training Support Group 22
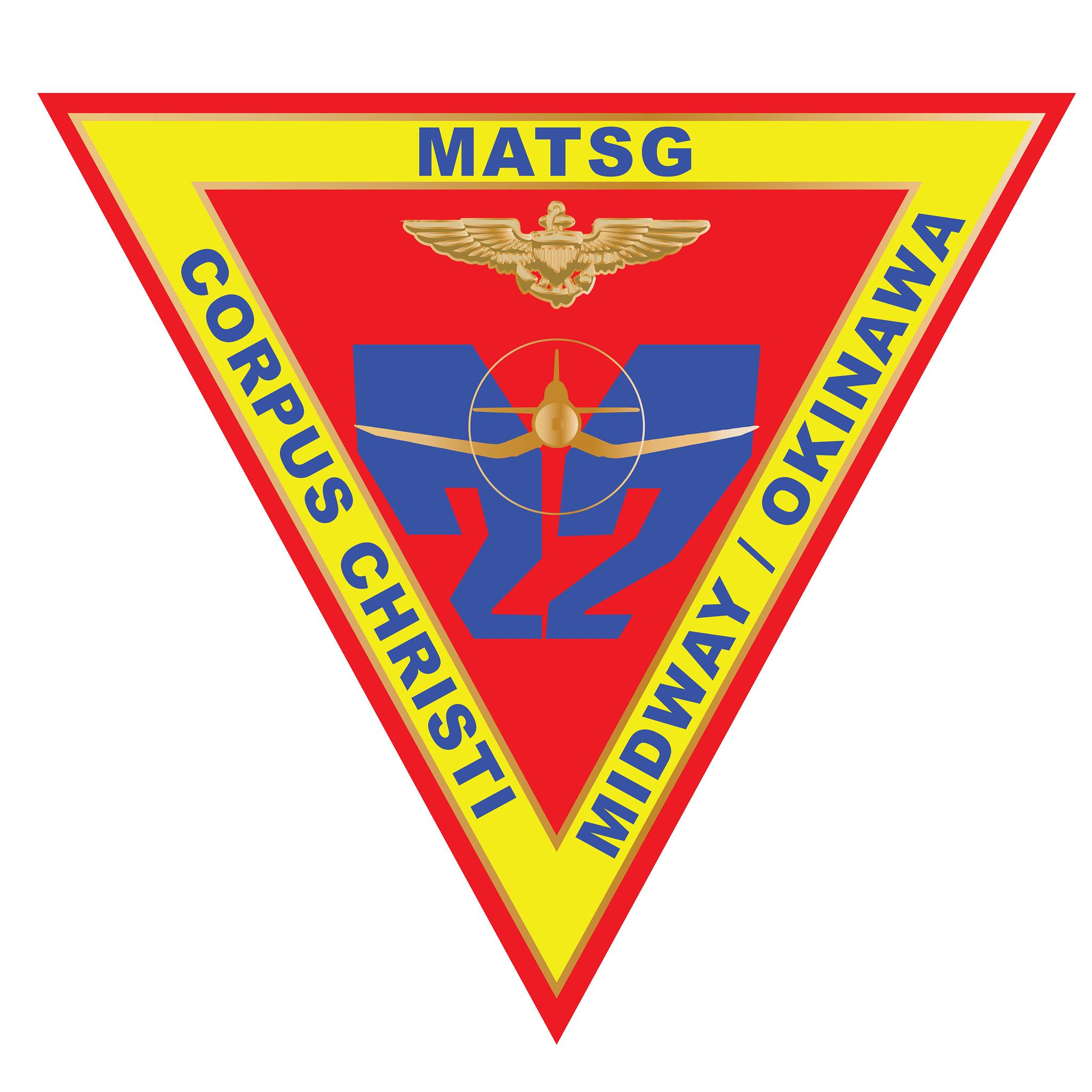
- MATSG-22 insignia
- Active: 1 March 1942 – 30 April 1947; 15 January 1982 – present
- Country: United States
- Branch: United States Marine Corps
- Role: Training
- Garrison/HQ: Naval Air Station Corpus Christi
- Nickname: Foreign Legion of Marine Aviation
- Engagements: World War II; Battle of Midway; Marshall Islands Campaign; Battle of Okinawa

Commanders
- Current commander: Col Lawrence Orion Jones
- Notable commanders: William J. Wallace; Ira L. Kimes

Marine Aviation Training Support Group 22 (MATSG-22) is a United States Marine Corps aviation training group that was originally established during World War II as Marine Aircraft Group 22 (MAG-22). Squadrons from MAG-22, were decimated at the Battle of Midway and, after reconstituting, fought during the Battle of Okinawa. The group was deactivated following the end of the war and was not reactivated until 1 May 2000, when the Marine Aviation Detachment at Naval Air Station Corpus Christi, Texas was renamed MATSG-22.

== Mission ==
The mission of MATSG-22 is to represent the Commanding General, Training Command in enabling Marine training through Service advocacy and support while reinforcing Marine Corps values, warfighting ethos, principles, and competencies to provide the best-trained Marines to the Fleet Marine Force. MATSG-22 also maintains liaison and fosters relationships across the training enterprise to ensure all training meets the needs of our operating forces.

== Subordinate units ==
- Marine Corps Detachment Fort Huachuca
- Marine Corps Detachment Lackland Air Force Base
- Marine Corps Detachment Goodfellow Air Force Base
- Marine Corps Detachment Randolph Air Force Base

== History ==
=== MAG-22 ===
In early January 1942, Lieutenant Colonel William J. Wallace arrived at Midway Atoll to take command of the Marine Aircraft Group 21 (MAG-21) Midway detachment. At that time, the detachment contained VMSB-231 and VMF-221 both of which had arrived on Christmas Day 1941 flying off of the USS Saratoga (CV-3). On 1 March 1942, MAG-21's Midway detachment was commissioned as Marine Aircraft Group 22, initially composed of VMF-221, VMF-222, VMSB-241, and VMSB-242 (VMF-222 and VMSB-242 would later be transferred off of the island on 12 April 1942). From its inception, until several months after the war, the group did not serve within the continental limits of the United States, hence it earned the popular name of "Foreign Legion of Marine Aviation".

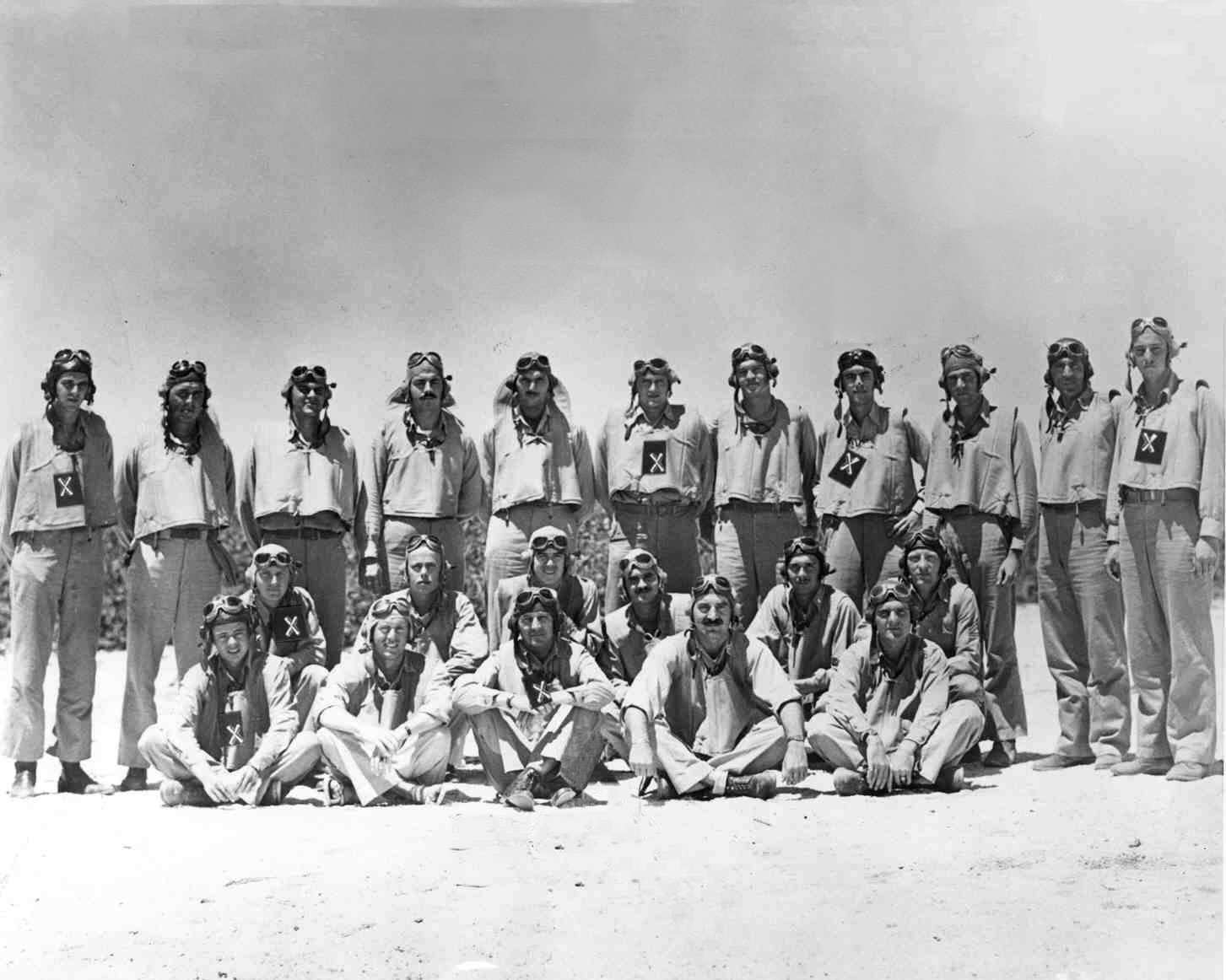
Pilots of VMSB-241 on Midway.

The first enemy plane shot down by a MAG-22 aircraft occurred on 10 March 1942, when a 4-plane section from VMF-221, piloted by Capt. James L. Neefus, 1stLt. Francis P. McCarthy, 1stLt. Charles W. Somers Jr., and MarGun. Robert L. Dickey, engaged a Japanese Kawanishi H6K 45 miles from Midway Atoll. Upon their return, the Marine Aircraft Group commander presented a bottle of bourbon to the pilots for their efforts, and were later formally awarded by Admiral Chester W. Nimitz.

Captain Neefus made the first pass, drew smoke from one engine, and the target dove for a cloud bank at 3,000 feet. Lieutenants McCarthy and Somers made modified overhead passes (one each) before the patrol bomber reached the cloud bank. Marine Gunner Dickey made a tail approach and received a wound in his left shoulder and seven bullet holes in his plane. * * * Captain Neefus was able to return and make a second pass. Dropping below the clouds, scattered, burning debris was observed on the surface of the water.

Major Ira L. Kimes assumed command of the group on 19 April 1942, which he would lead through the Battle of Midway. For his leadership in the pivotal battle, he was awarded the Navy Distinguished Service Medal.

==== Defense of Midway ====
On 4 June 1942, Midway Atoll, defended by VMF-221 and VMSB-241, came under attack by the Imperial Japanese Navy. VMF-221, in two sections led by Major Floyd B. Parks and Captain Kirk Armistead, flying the Brewster F2A-3 Buffalo and Grumman F4F-3 Wildcat constituting a force of 25 aircraft, flew to intercept the incoming Japanese Midway Attack Force of 108 aircraft. In the ensuing 15 minute engagement, 32 enemy aircraft were shot down; however, of the 25 Marines that went into battle, only 10 would return and only two of the aircraft would remain operational.

Meanwhile, VMSB-241, also split into two sections led by Major Benjamin W. Norris and Major Lofton R. Henderson flying the Vought SB2U Vindicator and Douglas SBD-2 Dauntless, flew to attack the approaching Japanese Naval Striking Force. Through their efforts, the squadron was able to damage the Japanese aircraft carrier Akagi, at the loss of 16 aircraft and crew, including those of the two Majors leading the attack. The following day, the squadron launched a second attack on several damaged Japanese cruisers, once again as two sections, led by Captain Marshall A. Tyler and Captain Richard E. Fleming. Captain Tyler's attack bracketed the Mogami with 6 near misses, causing topside damage to the ship. As Captain Fleming pressed his attack on the Japanese cruiser Mikuma, his aircraft was struck and set aflame by anti-aircraft fire. Despite the severe damage inflicted on his aircraft, he maintained his course, achieving a near-miss before crashing into the sea. For his actions, he was posthumously awarded the Congressional Medal of Honor. Fleming's rear gunner and radioman, Private First Class George A. Toms, was posthumously awarded the Distinguished Flying Cross.

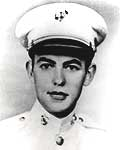
Captain Richard E. Fleming, Medal of Honor recipient.

Presidential Unit Citation

For conspicuous courage and heroism in combat at Midway Island during June, 1942. Outnumbered five to one, MARINE AIRCRAFT GROUP TWENTY-TWO boldly intercepted a heavily escorted enemy bombing force, disrupting their attack and preventing serious damage to island installations. Operating with half of their dive-bombers obsolete and in poor mechanical condition which necessitated vulnerable glide bombing tactics, they succeeded in inflicting heavy damage on Japanese surface units of a large enemy task force. The skill and gallant perseverance of flight and ground personnel of MARINE AIRCRAFT GROUP TWENTY-TWO, fighting under tremendously adverse and dangerous conditions, were essential factors in the unyielding defense of Midway.

Outnumbered overall 2:1 in inferior aircraft with far less training than their enemy, the Marines successfully defended Midway. MAG-22 aircraft downed 43 of the 108 enemy aircraft: 25 Aichi D3A "Val" dive-bombers and 18 Mitsubishi A6M Zeros. The group also damaged three Japanese ships. All of this success in combat came at a great cost. Of the 52 aircraft that intercepted Japanese forces, only 20 returned. Including the Marines in the MAG's ground echelon, casualties totaled 7 killed in action, 35 missing in action (presumed dead), and 25 wounded in action. Over 50 Marines were awarded for their valor, skill, and leadership in defending the island, and MAG-22 was awarded the Presidential Unit Citation. Shortly after the end of the battle, Admiral Nimitz perfectly summarized the significance of the Marine defenders in the following dispatch to the MAG:

Please accept my sympathy for the losses sustained by your gallant aviation personnel based at Midway. Their sacrifice was not in vain. When the great emergency came, they were ready. They met unflinchingly the attack of vastly superior numbers and made the attack ineffective. They struck the first blow at the enemy carriers. They were the spearhead of our great victory. They have written a new and shining page in the annals of the Marine Corps.

==== Marshall Islands ====
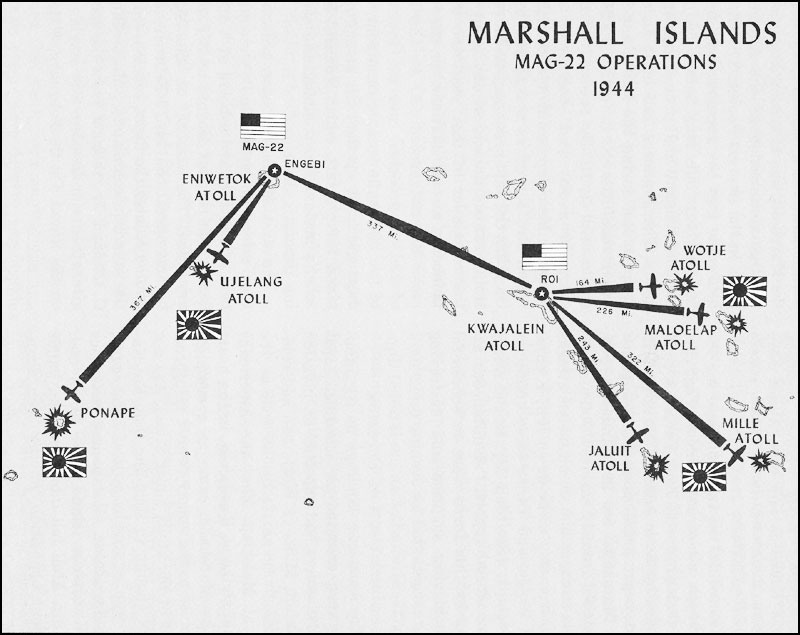
Map of MAG-22 Operations in the Marshall Island Campaign.

MAG-22 remained on Midway conducting routine patrol missions until 8 February 1944, joining the 4th Marine Base Defense Air Wing (later 4th MAW) at Eniwetok Atoll, arriving on Engebi island 19 February. At that time composed of VMF-113, VMF-422, and VMF(N)-533, flying the Vought F4U Corsair and Grumman F6F Hellcat, the group served a variety of missions across the many Atolls of the Marshall Islands.

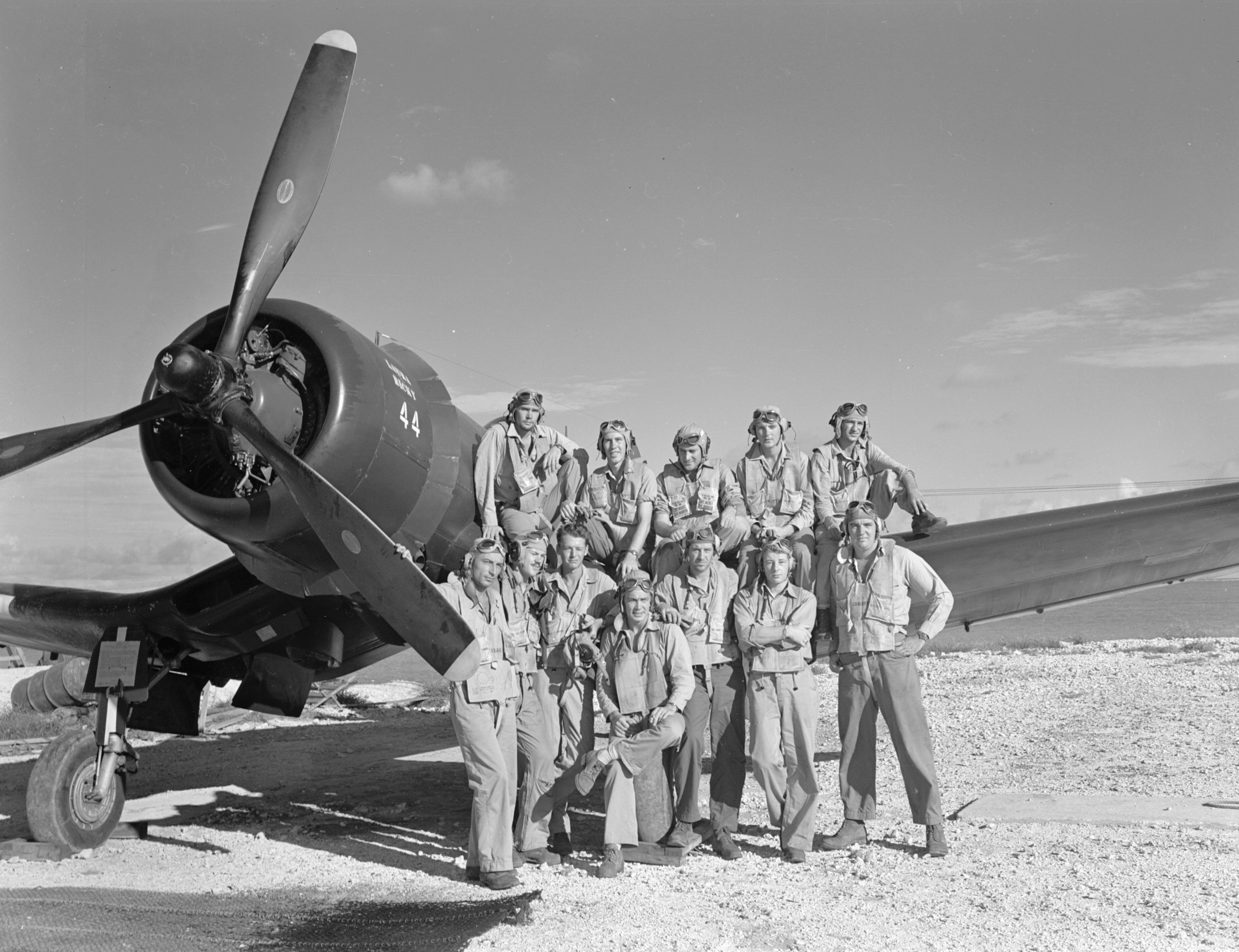
VMF-113 pilots pose for a photo on Engebi Island, 1944.

VMF-133 covered landings at Ujelang Atoll, and contributed to the neutralizations of Wotje Atoll, Maloelap Atoll, and Mili Atoll.

VMF-422 was sent to Roi-Namuron 27 May to conduct interdiction missions against Japanese bases and shipping in the islands. The squadron hosted Charles Lindbergh during this time, who accompanied them on three strike missions against Wotje Atoll in September. Additionally, the squadron's ground echelon did extensive ground work to prepare Engebi Island for operational use. VMF(N)-533 was responsible for night defense operations over Eniwetok.

===== Combat over Ponape =====
Ponape, 367 miles southwest of Eniwetok, was an enemy supply center for the Marshalls and Carolines. On 28 March, a flight of six Corsairs of VMF-113 escorted four Army Airforce B-25's of the 48th Bomber Squadron over the island. The flight came under attack by 12 Japanese aircraft, which the Marines effectively fended off. With zero losses suffered, eight enemy aircraft were shot down and one aircraft was destroyed on the ground. The blow was so severe, that no enemy air forces were encountered for the remainder of the campaign.

The air-to-air kills were credited as follows:
Major Everton (CO) [2]
Captain Frank C. Drury [1]
Lieutenant Joe V. Schellack [2.5]
Lieutenant Emmet O. Anglin [1]
Lieutenant Bernard A. Nelson [0.5]
Master Sergeant Peter Tunno [1].

VMF-422 launched additional strike missions against the island during March, April, and on 16 October 1944.

==== Battle of Okinawa ====
On 25 May 1945, MAG-22 (now reinforced with VMF-314 and VMTB-131) was added to the Tactical Air Force, Tenth Army (TAF), as part of 2nd MAW. The ground echelon arrived at Ie Shima on 6 May, joined by the flight echelon 21 May, where they operated from until 16 July. The Japanese air arm, specifically kamikazi attacks, was considered the biggest threat to the success of the invasion; therefore, the TAF's top priority was maintenance of air superiority over the objective and the 5th Fleet.

Of note were the Kikusiu raids; ten large kamikaze attacks carried out by the Imperial Japanese Army. On 24–25 May, after Japanese planes had bombed the Ie Shima airfield, and plenty of night fighting handled by VMF(N)-533, a 165-plane kamikaze attack was launched in an attempt to knock out the radar pickets and ships just off shore. VMF-422 scored their first 6 kills during this engagement. Despite shooting down many enemy aircraft, 11 American ships were sunk or damaged. Only two days later occurred the longest single alert of the Okinawa campaign lasting 9 hours 16 minutes. A total of approximately 150 enemy aircraft attempted to sink more ships. Marine pilots downed 32 aircraft; however, ten ships were damaged with one sunk. The last of the raids happened on 21–22 June. Marine night fighters downed 6 enemy aircraft; however, the two days of fighting also produced the following Navy Cross action of First Lieutenant John W. Leaper of VMF-314:

The most spectacular performance of the day was that of 1STLT John W Leaper of VMF-314 who shot down two Bettys one of which was mothering a Baka bomb. Having finished this chore, and nursing a windshield shattered by a 12.7mm bullet, he looked up to find a Zeke driving from above about 10 o'clock. He fired his last ten rounds of ammunition at the Zeke which took off after Leaper’s wingman 1STLT William L Milne, who had just destroyed two planes in the melee. Leaper unhesitatingly climbed until he was just under the Zeke and tried to saw off its tail with his propeller. He missed, climbed above the Japanese plane and on the second try ground his blade into the nose, forward of the cockpit. That did it, but almost did Leaper in. His Corsair's right pylon tank exploded, ripping off his right wing. Despite his planes violent spin, Leaper managed to bail out, but he split his parachute, broke two shroud lines and tore the dye marker off his Maw West. As if enough had not happened to him, Leaper saw another Zeke about to make a run on him, with six Corsairs chasing. Leaper collapsed his precarious parachute by yanking on the left shroud lines. He dropped like a bullet for 3,000 or 4,000 feet; then the chute reopened and he descended not too swiftly into the water. After an hour and a half Cheyenne picked him up.

While VMTB-131's primary mission was antisubmarine operations, it also assisted in resupply. After the 1st Marine Division and 77th Infantry Division captured Shuri Castle, very heavy rains flooded supply routes, making them completely impassible, leaving troops critically low on food and ammunition. Heavy clouds obscured the location of the ground forces, but the front line air liaison parties coached them in. Over 763 drops were made by Marine pilots, with 163 credited to VMTB-131, led by Major Douglas A. Bangert.

MAG-22 squadrons flew 22,912 combat hours, fought air-to-air duels, protected against kamikaze attacks, contributed to the execution of approximately 40% of all close air support missions, and 637 downed Japanese aircraft (506 of which were shot down by Marine units) with only 41 aircraft lost. VMF-113 was credited with 12 enemy aircraft downed, VMF-314 with 14 aircraft downed, VMF-422 with 15 aircraft downed, and VMTB-131 with one aircraft downed.

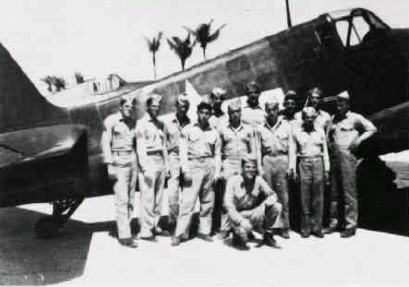
Pilots of VMF(N)-533 pose in front of one of their Grumman F6F-5N Hellcat aircraft on Okinawa, Japan, in 1945.

VMF(N)-533, once again conducting night operations, was responsible for 35 enemy aircraft shot down, the most of any night fighter squadron during the war, and suffered zero operational losses. Six of these were by a single pilot, Captain Robert Baird, who was the only Marine night ace of the war. For his service, he received the Navy Cross, Silver Star, and Distinguished Flying Cross.

MAG-22 received a second Presidential Unit Citation, being one of the subordinate units to 2nd Marine Aircraft Wing which was cited for the award.

With Okinawa secured, the MAG began flying out to Omura on Kyushi and then to Sasebo, where Colonel Elliott Bard embarked it for the United States. On 5 December 1945, MAG-22 saw the United States for the very first time; since Midway 1942, it had exclusively served on Pacific islands.

=== Marine Aerial Navigation School ===
Aerial navigation training first began for the Marine Corps in 1942 when five Marine officers were assigned to the Weems School Of Navigation in Annapolis, Maryland. After completing this course, these five officers became the nucleus who established the navigation school at Camp Kearny in San Diego, California. A year later the school was moved to Marine Corps Air Station Cherry Point, North Carolina where they graduated their first class of navigators in January 1945. This training program existed only as a ground school. In March 1948 the school was disbanded.

In March 1952 after the beginning of the Korean War, the Aerial Navigation School was reactivated as part of the Airborne Operation School located at MCAS Cherry Point. The Airborne Operation School consisted of the Aerial Navigation School, Radio Operator School and the Electronic Countermeasures School. During this time Marine Navigators trained in such aircraft as C-54s, R4D-6s, and R4D-8s (Super DC-3). The Aerial Navigation School remained at Cherry Point until January 1971 at which time it was moved to Naval Air Station Pensacola, Florida, where the Navy assumed responsibility for flight support. A detachment of T-29 aircraft from VT-29 NAS Corpus Christi, which had been previously assigned for Navy support, now provided flight support for the Aerial Navigation School. At this point the name of the school was changed to the Marine Aerial Navigation School (MANS).

After two years at Naval Air Station Pensacola, the Navy moved the detachment of T-29s and the Marine School moved to NAS Corpus Christi in order to continue the T-29 support. Due to the phasing out of the T-29s in 1976 at Corpus Christi, the Marines of MANS were then relocated to Mather Air Force Base, CA, where they utilized the T43 aircraft. In January 1993, MANS was once again relocated to Randolph AFB, TX. Marine instructors utilizing the 12th Flying Training Wing navigation training facilities staff the Marine Aerial Navigation School (MANS). The command mission of the Marine Aerial Navigation School is to train and qualify enlisted Marines in the "Scientific Art of Navigation" and as Navigators of tactical transport aircraft in support of the Fleet Marine Force.

=== 2000 – present ===
In May 2000, the Commandant of the Marine Corps directed the re-designation of Marine Aviation Detachment NAS Corpus Christi as Marine Aviation Training Support Group 22. All Marine Aviation Training Support Groups were redesignated to promote a sense of Marine Corps identity and tradition and allows them and their history to live on.

== Awards ==
- Presidential Unit Citation with two silver bands
- Asiatic-Pacific Campaign Medal with three bronzes stars
- Navy Occupation Service Medal with Asia clasp

=== MAG-22 Battle of Midway Navy Cross Recipients ===
- VMF – 221
- Major Floyd B. Parks † (CO)
- Captain Kirk Armistead (CO)
- Captain William C. Humberd (XO)
- Captain John R. Alvord †
- Captain Robert E. Curtin
- Captain Daniel J. Hennessy †
- Captain Francis P. McCarthy †
- Captain John F. Carey
- Captain Marion E. Carl
- Captain Herbert T. Merrill
- Captain Philip R. White
- First Lieutenant Robert W. Vaupell
- First Lieutenant Charles M. Kunz
- Second Lieutenant Thomas W. Benson †
- Second Lieutenant John M. Butler †
- Second Lieutenant Eugene Madole †
- Second Lieutenant Elwood Q. Lindsay †
- Second Lieutenant John D. Lucas †
- Second Lieutenant Martin E. Mahannah †
- Second Lieutenant David W. Pinkerton †
- Second Lieutenant William B. Sandoval †
- Second Lieutenant Walter W. Swansberger †
- Second Lieutenant Clayton M. Canfield
- Second Lieutenant Roy A. Corry
- VMSB – 241
- Major Lofton R. Henderson † (CO)
- Major Benjamin W. Norris † (CO)
- Captain Marshall A. Tyler (XO)
- Captain Armond H. DeLalio
- Captain Richard L. Blain
- Captain Leon M. Williamson
- Captain Elmer Glidden
- First Lieutenant Robert W. Vaupell
- First Lieutenant Robert J. Bear
- First Lieutenant Sumner H. Whitten
- First Lieutenant Daniel T. Iverson
- First Lieutenant Harold G. Schlendering
- Second Lieutenant Albert W. Tweedy, Jr. †
- Second Lieutenant Thomas J. Gratzek †
- Second Lieutenant Maurice A. Ward †
- Second Lieutenant Thomas F. Moore
- Second Lieutenant Bruce H. Ek †
- Second Lieutenant Bruno P. Hagedorn†
- Second Lieutenant Jesse D. Rollow
- Technical Sergeant Clyde H. Stamps

== See also ==
- United States Marine Corps Aviation
- List of United States Marine Corps aircraft groups

== Notes ==
This article incorporates text in the public domain from the United States Marine Corps.
