= Armond H. DeLalio =

USMC Navy Cross recipient

Armond Hector DeLalio
- Born: 17 July 1917; Plainview, New York, US
- Died: 5 January 1952 (aged 34) Naval Air Station Patuxent River, Maryland, US
- Buried: Long Island National Cemetery
- Allegiance: United States
- Branch: United States Marine Corps
- Rank: Lieutenant Colonel
- Conflicts: World War II: Attack on Pearl Harbor; Battle of Midway; Battle of Okinawa
- Awards: Navy Cross; Purple Heart (2)

Armond Hector DeLalio (17 July 1917 – 5 January 1952) was a highly decorated United States Marine Corps lieutenant colonel. He was awarded the Navy Cross during World War II and later became the first Marine aviator to be designated as a helicopter pilot.

== Early life and career ==
Armond H. DeLalio was born on 17 July 1917, in Plainview, New York. DeLalio grew up on a farm and often spent his free time watching planes take off from Republic Airfield in East Farmingdale, New York.

He entered the Naval Reserve Officers Training Corps while he was studying aeronautical engineering in college. DeLalio entered the Marine Corps and completed aviation training at Naval Air Station Pensacola, Florida.

== World War II ==
DeLalio was assigned to Marine Corps Air Station Ewa in Hawaii, and was there when the Japanese attacked Pearl Harbor on 7 December 1941. After the attack, DeLalio earned a commendation flying a plane to Midway and was assigned to Marine Scout Bombing Squadron 241, Marine Aircraft Group 22, where he was made the third section leader.

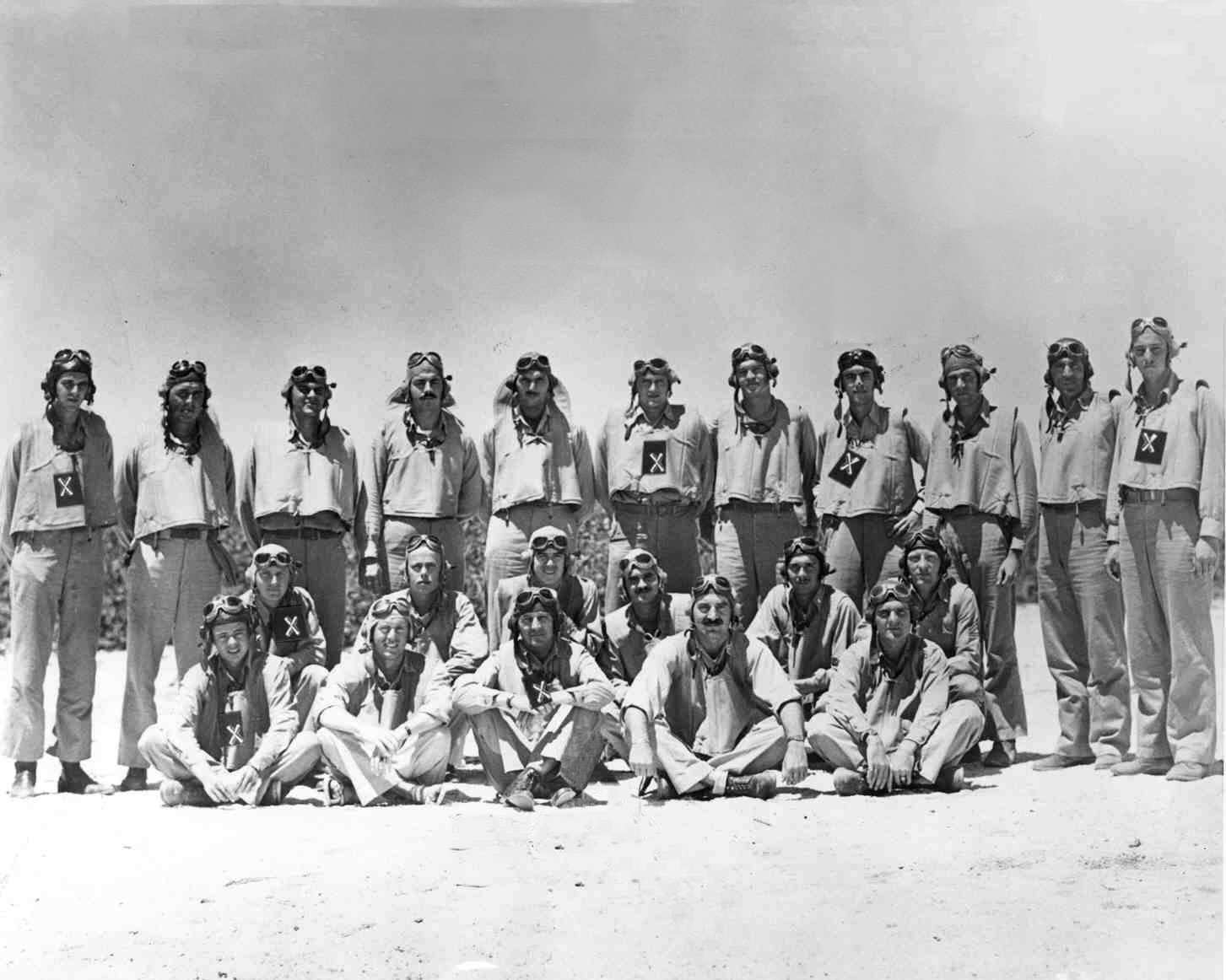
Photo from May 1942 showing the officers from VMSB-241. DeLalio is the fifth man standing from the left.

During the Battle of Midway on 4 June 1942, Captain DeLalio attacked the Japanese aircraft carrier Hiryū with his Douglas SBD-2 Dauntless dive bomber. He dove as low as 400 feet despite heavy enemy fire which damaged his plane before he released his bomb. His squadron leader, Lofton R. Henderson, was killed during this action. DeLalio was able to return to his base despite inclement weather. Early the next day, DeLalio participated in a dive bombing attack on a Japanese heavy cruiser. For his actions during the battle, DeLalio was awarded the Navy Cross in November.

Following the battle, DeLalio was assigned to the Pentagon where he oversaw the development of helicopters. In 1944, he began flying Navy helicopters at Floyd Bennett Field in Brooklyn. From April to June 1945, Major DeLalio was the commanding officer of Marine Fighting Squadron 351 (VMF-351) during the Battle of Okinawa.

== Post-war career ==
On 8 August 1946, DeLalio became the first Marine to be certified as a helicopter pilot. He was the 16th Naval aviator to become a certified helicopter pilot.

On 5 January 1952, DeLalio test flew a Sikorsky HRS fitted with a rocket-assisted takeoff pod at Naval Air Station Patuxent River, Maryland. The pod malfunctioned and the helicopter caught fire before it crashed from an altitude of 75 feet (23 m). Both DeLalio and a Navy pilot, Lieutenant Commander Edward A. Arnold, were killed. DeLalio was survived by his wife and three children and was buried in Long Island National Cemetery.

== Posthumous honors ==
A road at Patuxent River was named for DeLalio. In 1965, an elementary school at Camp Lejeune, North Carolina, was named in his honor. In 2018, a new elementary school was constructed and named for DeLalio, and the old school was subsequently demolished.
