= VMA-241 =

Marine Attack Squadron 241
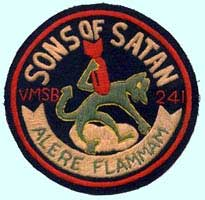
- VMSB-241 insignia
- Active: 1 March 1942 – 15 July 1945; 1946 - 1960s
- Country: United States
- Branch: USMC
- Type: Attack Squadron
- Role: Close air support Air interdiction
- Part of: Inactive
- Nickname: Sons of Satan
- Mottos: "Alere Flammam" "To Feed the Flames"
- Tail Code: QG
- Engagements: World War II * Battle of Midway * Philippines Campaign (1944–45)

Aircraft flown
- Attack: A-4A Skyhawk
- Bomber: SB2U-3 Vindicator; SBD Dauntless

Marine Attack Squadron 241 (VMA-241) was an aircraft squadron of the United States Marine Corps, known as the "Sons of Satan". The squadron was commissioned during World War II and took part in the Battle of Midway, sustaining 75% losses. It was extensively involved in combat while providing close air support during the 1944–1945 Philippines Campaign. The squadron, equipped with A-4 Skyhawk light attack aircraft, became part of the Marine Forces Reserve, based at Naval Air Station Los Alamitos, California, from 1946 until the 1960s.

== History ==
=== World War II ===
==== Battle of Midway ====
Marine Scout Bomber Squadron 241 (VMSB-241) was formed at Midway Atoll on 1 March 1942 as part of Marine Aircraft Group 22 (MAG-22). From 4–6 June 1942 the squadron fought in the Battle of Midway where it lost 23 of its 30 aircraft and suffered 22 killed in action and 14 wounded in action. At 0605 on 4 June the squadron received word to scramble all of their aircraft to attack a Japanese aircraft carrier task force that had been spotted 180 miles of the atoll. VMSB-241 had divided into two striking units, the first composed of 16 SBD-2s led by Major Lofton Henderson, and the second of 11 SB2U-3s commanded by Major Benjamin W. Norris. Henderson's group climbed to 9,000 feet to locate the enemy carriers, which were then undergoing an attack from six United States Navy Grumman TBF Avengers (launched from Midway but assigned to the USS Hornet and four United States Army Air Forces Martin B-26 Marauders. Fliers of this group sighted the Japanese ships at 0744, but as the SBDs spiraled down they were set upon by swarms of A6M Zeros flying air cover, which were soon reinforced by more fighters from the carriers below. Henderson and several other were shot down (only eight of these planes got back to Midway) and the strike scored no hits, although some were claimed. At 1700 a burning enemy carrier was reported 200 miles northwest of Midway, and Major Norris prepared VMSB-241's six operational SBD-2s and five SB2U-3s for a night attack. The planes took off at 1900, but could not find the carrier. Major Norris failed to return from this mission, although the other pilots managed to come home by the light of oil fires and the antiaircraft searchlights which were turned up as beacons.

Early in the morning of 5 June 1942, Captain Richard E. Fleming's SB2U-3 Vindicator was hit and on fire as he continued his attack on the Japanese cruiser Mikuma. He maintained his dive, released his bomb for a near miss and crashed into the sea aft of the cruiser. For this action he was posthumously awarded the Medal of Honor.

==== 1943 & 1944 ====
VMSB-241 remained on Midway Atoll until March 1943 when it departed for Marine Corps Air Station Ewa, Territory of Hawaii. On 24 April 1943, VMSB-241, now part of arrived at Tutuila where it remained for the next eight months. On 16 December 1943 the squadron moved up to Efate. Remained on island until 2 February 1944 when it moved to Piva on Bougainville. The squadron returned to Efate on 18 March. On 13 May 1944 the squadron's flight echelon moved to Emirau to begin conducting bombing missions against the Japanese garrison on Rabaul. Ground echelon moved to Munda, Solomon Islands on 18 Jun and was joined by the flight echelon on 8 July.

==== Philippines ====
On 20 September 1944, General George Kenney, Commander of the Far East Air Forces arrived on Bougainville and informed 1st Marine Aircraft Wing leadership that all of the wing's dive bomber squadrons were to be utilized to support the Sixth United States Army during the upcoming campaign to liberate Luzon. In preparation for departure, VMSB-241 was ferried from Munda to Bougainville on 22-23 November. Marine Aircraft Group 24's ground echelons sailed from Bougainville on 12 December onboard four transport vessels. VMSB-241's flight echelon departed Emirau on 19 January heading for Peleliu via Momote and Owi. On 25 January 1944, the squadron finally got the nod to fly into the newly built airstrip at Mangaldan. On 27 January 1945, Major Ben Manchester, Commanding Officer of VMSB-241, led 18 of the squadron's SBDs in the first Marine Corps airstrikes on Luzon. The squadron attacked military targets in the vicinity of San Fernando. February and March saw VMSB-241 and the rest of MAG-24 providing close air support, flank protection and reconnaissance for the 1st Cavalry Division during its drive towards Manila.

Combat operations on Luzon were discontinued on 2 April to allow the squadron to prepare for follow on operations in Mindanao. VMSB-241 departed Clark Air Base on 20 April bound for Malabang, Mindanao. The squadron, along with the rest of MAG-24, was tasked with supporting the 24th and 31st Infantry Divisions in their eastward push across Mindinao.

During its time in the Philippines, VMSB-241 suffered six Marine killed in action and another six Marines wounded in action. On 16 July 1945, while stationed at Titcomb Field south of Malabang, VMSB-241 was ordered to decommission along with VMSB-133 by 1st MAW General Order No. 18-45.

== Reserve years ==
In 1946 the squadron became part of the Marine Air Reserve based at Naval Air Station Los Alamitos, California. It was brought back onto active duty in August 1950 at the outbreak of the Korean War and sent to Marine Corps Air Station El Toro, California where the unit's members were dispersed amongst other active duty units.

== Gallery ==
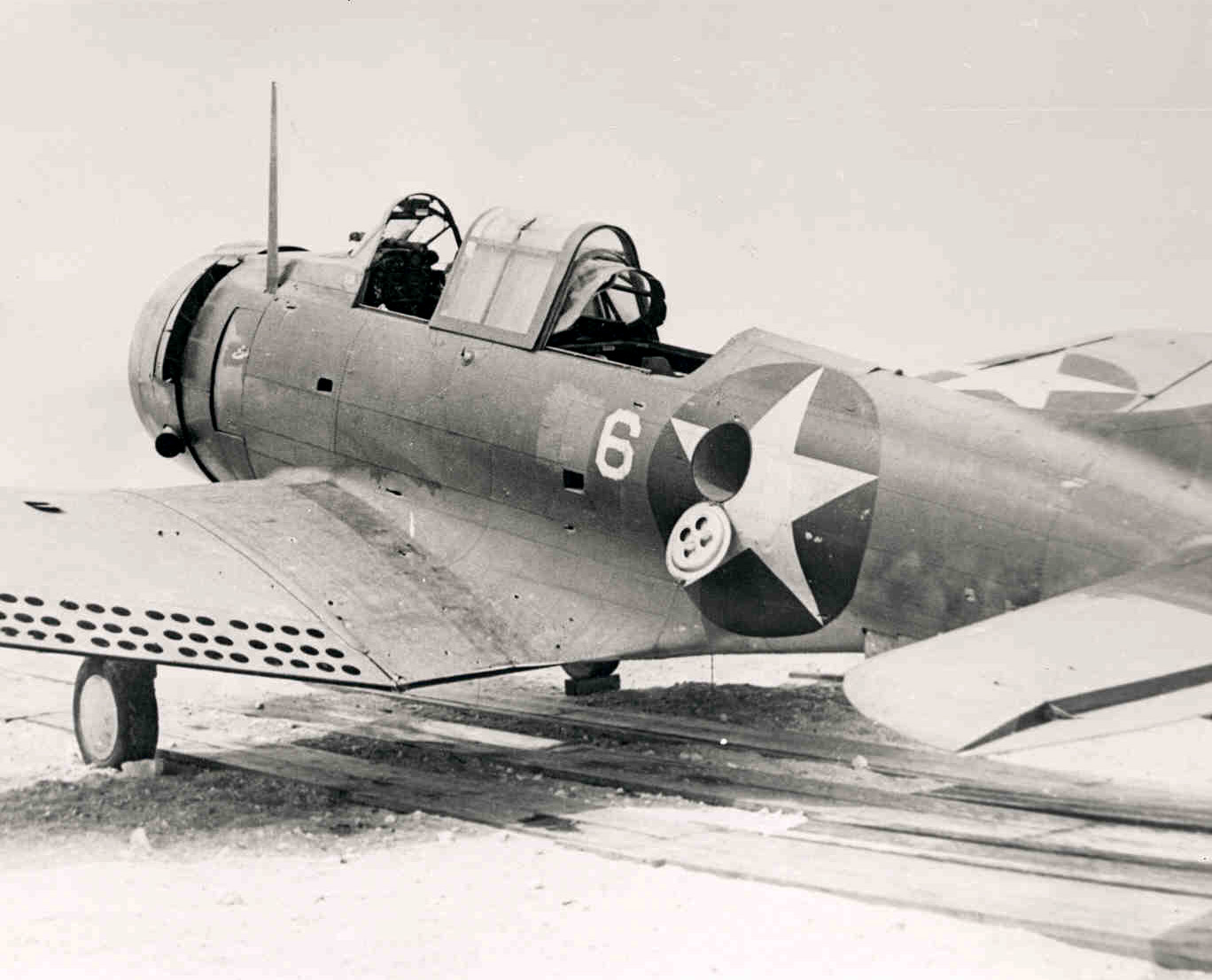
A U.S. Marine Corps Douglas SBD-2 Dauntless of Marine scout bombing squadron VMSB-241 on Midway Atoll, 4 June 1942.

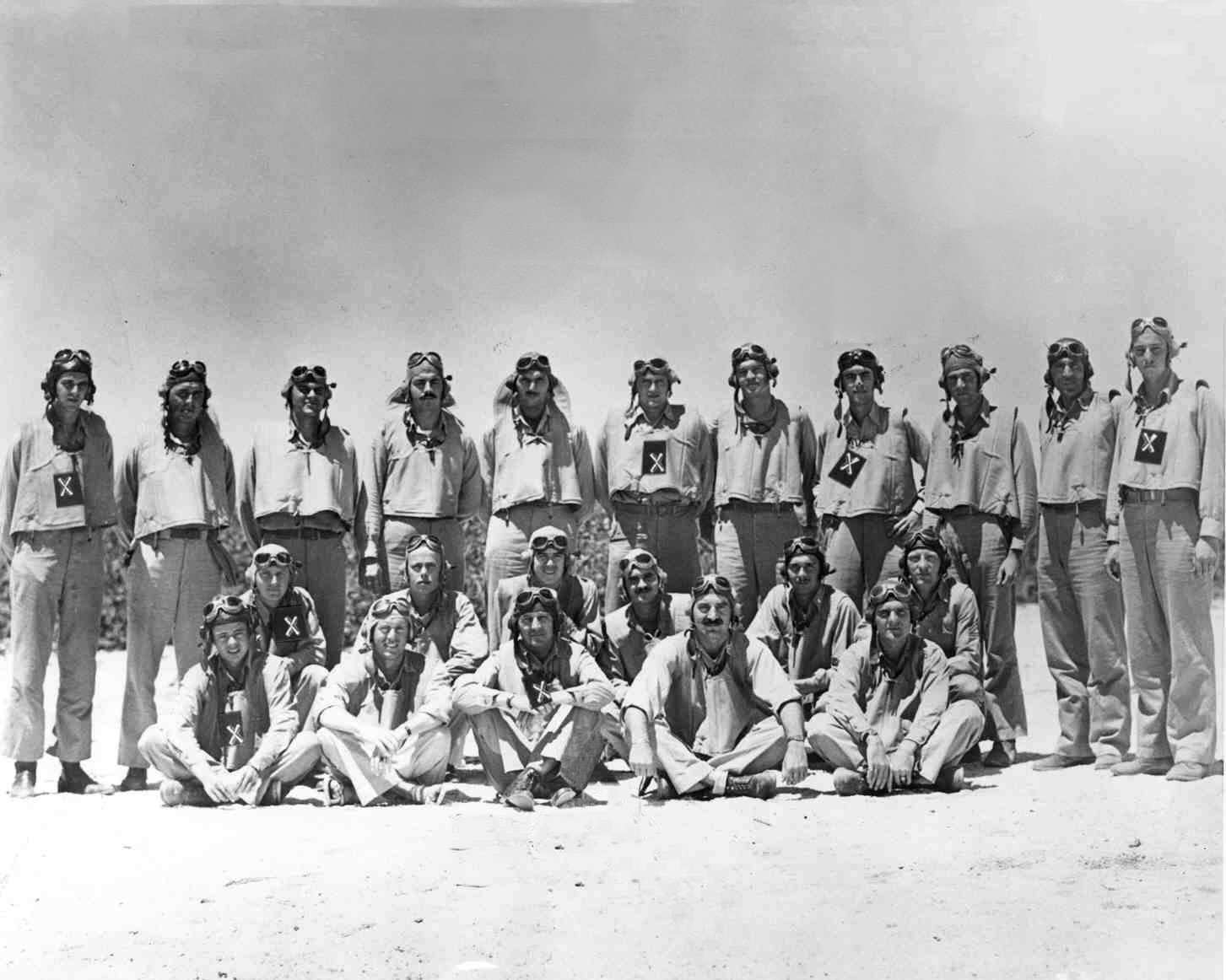
Photo from May 1942 showing the officers from VMSB-241.

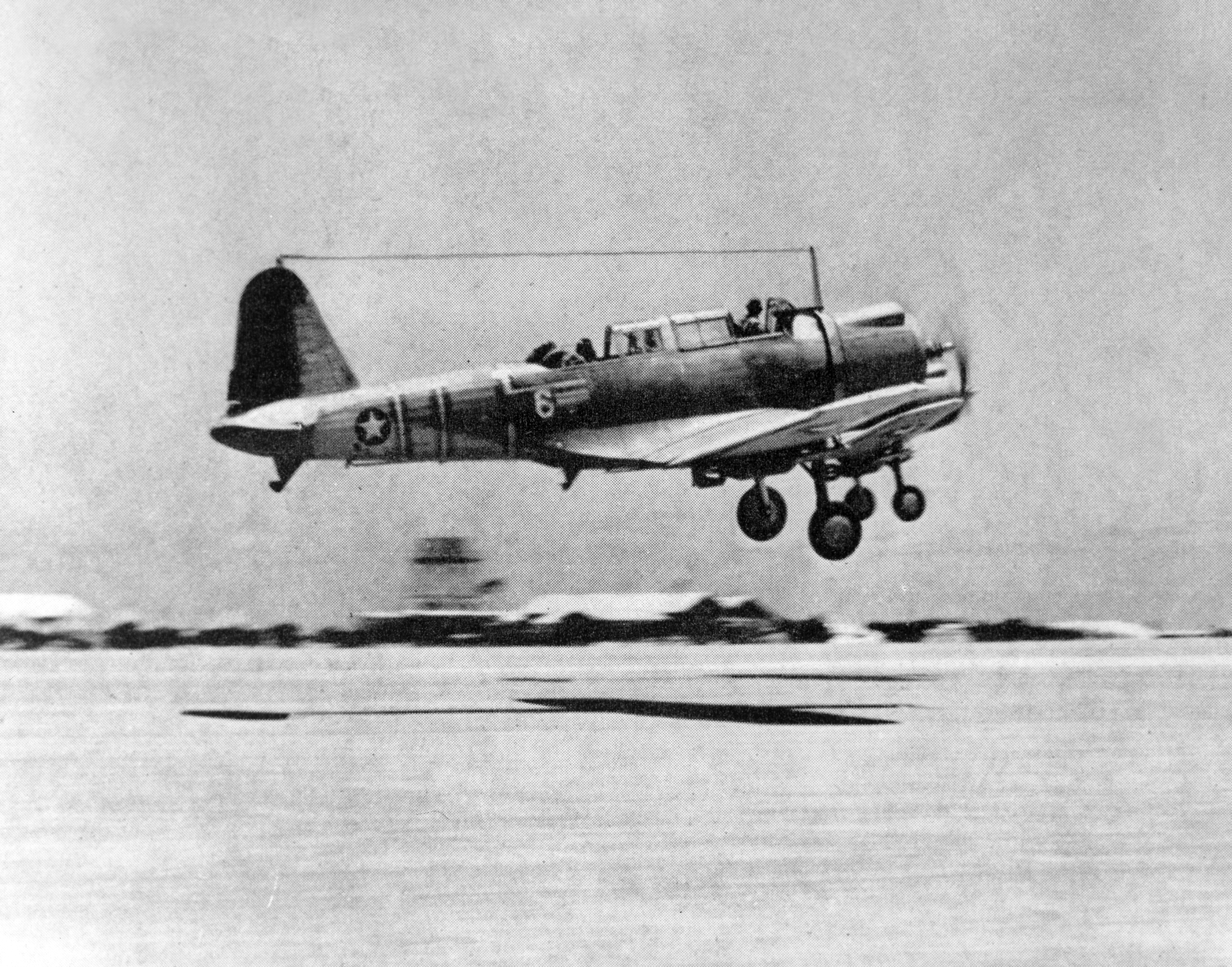
Two Vought SB2U-3 Vindicators of VMSB-241 take off from Midway Atoll. Plane No. 6 in the foreground (BuNo 2045) was flown on June 4, 1942 by 2nd Lt James H. Marmande with PFC Edby Colvin as gunner. This plane was flown in the morning attack against the Japanese and disappeared on the night of 4/5 June about 16 km (10 mi) from Midway.

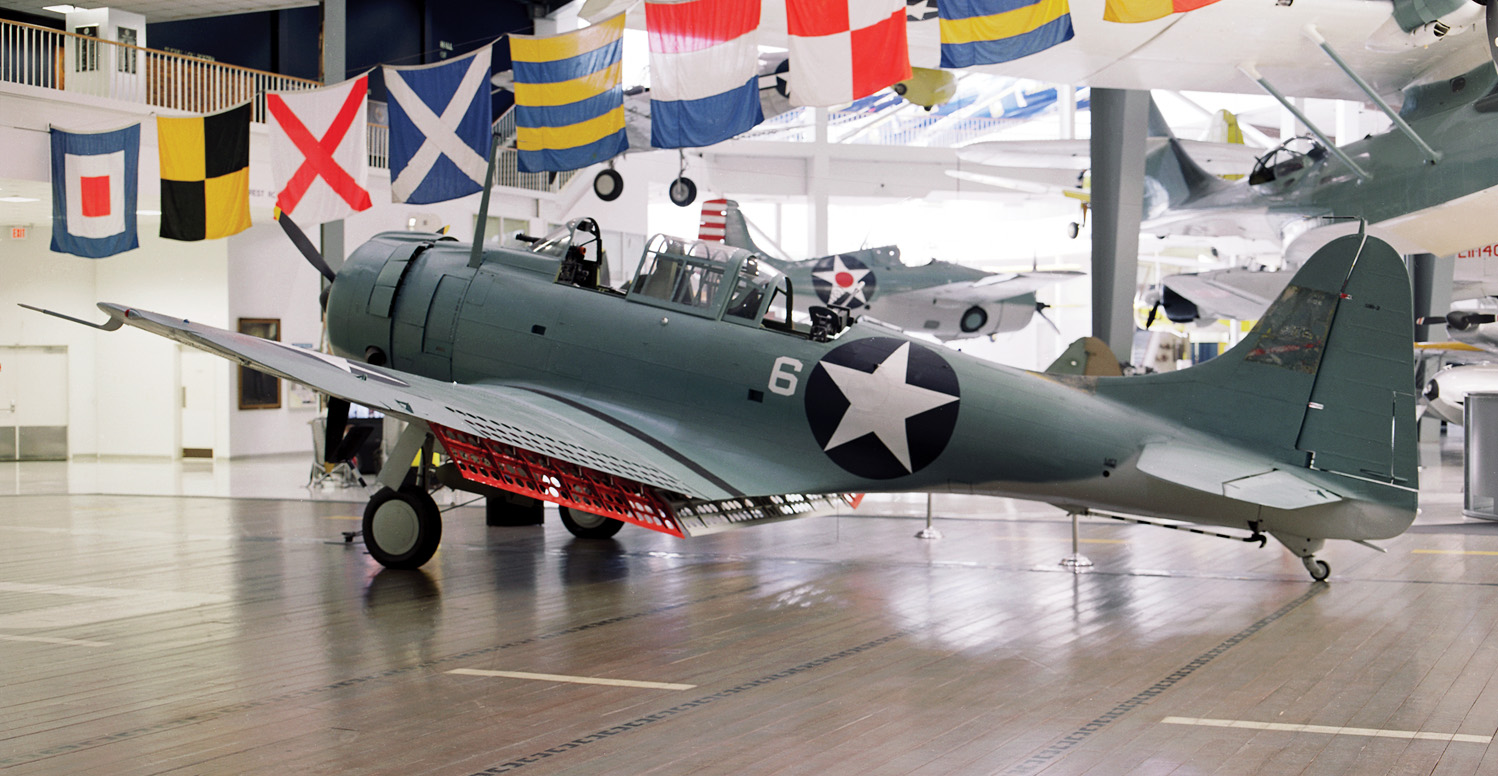
This SBD-2 was one of sixteen dive bombers of VMSB-241 launched from Midway on the morning of 4 June. Holed 219 times in the attack on the carrier Hiryū, it survives today at the National Naval Aviation Museum at Pensacola, Florida.

== Notable Members ==
- Richard E. Fleming - Medal of Honor recipient for heroic action at the Battle of Midway.
- Armond H. DeLalio - recipient of the Navy Cross for actions during the Battle of Midway.
- Albert William Tweedy, Jr. - recipient of the Navy Cross for actions during the Battle of Midway.
- Thomas F. Moore, Jr. - recipient of the Navy Cross for actions during the Battle of Midway.

== See also ==
- United States Marine Corps Aviation
- List of United States Marine Corps aircraft squadrons
- List of decommissioned United States Marine Corps aircraft squadrons
