= Ira L. Kimes =

United States Marine Corps general

Ira Laffayete Kimes
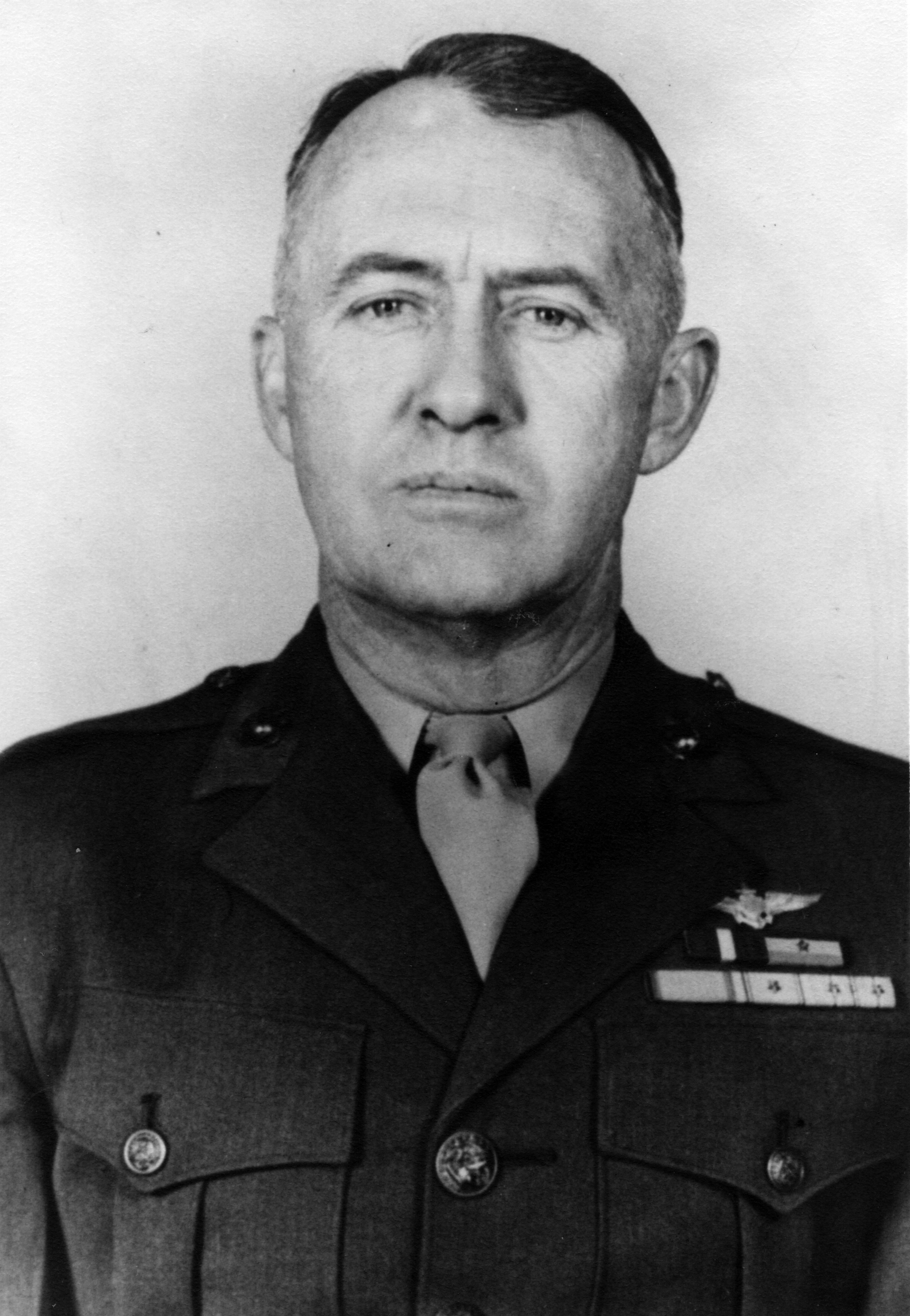
- Kimes as Colonel, USMC.
- Born: August 8, 1899; Fayetteville, Tennessee, US
- Died: February 3, 1949 (aged 52)
- Burial place: Arlington National Cemetery
- Military career
- Allegiance: United States of America
- Branch: United States Marine Corps
- Service years: 1923–1945
- Rank: Brigadier general
- Commands: Marine Corps Air Station, Quantico; Marine Aircraft Group 22; Marine Scout Bombing Squadron 232
- Conflicts: Haitian Campaign; World War II: Attack on Pearl Harbor; Battle of Midway
- Awards: Navy Distinguished Service Medal

Ira Laffayete Kimes (August 8, 1899 - February 3, 1949) was a highly decorated naval aviator of the United States Marine Corps with the rank of brigadier general. He is most noted for his service as commanding officer of Marine Aircraft Group 22 during the Battle of Midway, for which he received the Navy Distinguished Service Medal.

== Early life ==
Kimes was born on August 8, 1899, in Fayetteville, Tennessee, but his family moved to Hunnewell, Missouri, where he attended high school. He then accepted appointment to the United States Naval Academy at Annapolis, Maryland, and graduated with bachelor's degree on June 7, 1923. While at the academy, Kimes was a member of the rifle team and was designated expert rifleman.

Many of his classmates became general officers later: Arleigh Burke, Harry D. Felt, Merrill B. Twining, Charles F. Coe, John B. Moss, Frederick Moosbrugger, Stanhope C. Ring, Thomas B. Williamson, William D. Anderson, Murr E. Arnold, John G. Crommelin, Paul F. Dugan, George F. Good Jr., William H. Hamilton, Francis M. Hughes, Joseph L. Kane, William G. Manley, Henry G. Moran, Richard M. Oliver, Edwin R. Peck, John V. Peterson, William T. Rassieur, William J. Scheyer, Francis E. Shoup Jr., Curtis S. Smiley, Frederick C. Stelter Jr., Frank D. Weir, Ralph W.D. Woods, Howard L. Young, Richard M. Cutts Jr., Samuel G. Fuqua, Merlin F. Schneider, Frank H. Lamson-Scribner or Henry A. Schade.

At the time of his graduation, he was commissioned second lieutenant in the Marine Corps and sent to the Basic School at Philadelphia Navy Yard for further officer's training. Kimes completed his training and served on various stations in the United States until December 1925. He subsequently sailed for Haiti as a member of 1st Marine Brigade under Brigadier General John T. Myers and took part in the skirmishes against Cacos bandits.

Kimes remained in the Caribbean until April 1927, and following his return he applied for aviation training. He was ordered to the Naval Air Station Pensacola, Florida, and after one year of instruction, Kimes was designated Naval aviator on April 30, 1928. He was promoted to the rank of first lieutenant in July of that year.

He returned to Haiti in 1932 and served as operations and communications officer with Aircraft Squadron until summer 1933. Kimes was decorated with the Haitian National Order of Honour and Merit, rank Chevalier by the Government of Haiti for his service in that country.

Following his return stateside in August 1933, he was commended by the Secretary of the Navy, Claude A. Swanson, for achieving the highest machine gun score for Marine Corps shore-based observation and fighting plane squadrons. He was promoted to the rank of captain in April 1935 and ordered to the Junior course at Marine Corps Schools, Quantico.

Kimes was ordered to the Air Corps Tactical School at Maxwell Field, Alabama, in September 1937 and graduated in June 1938. He was promoted to the rank of major in July 1939 and assumed command of Utility Squadron 1-M at Turner Field, Virginia and remained in this capacity until summer 1940.

== World War II ==
Kimes was appointed commanding officer of Marine Scout Bombing Squadron 232 in July 1940 at San Diego and moved with his unit to Hawaii in January 1941 with the increasing tensions in the Pacific. He was present at Marine Corps Air Station Ewa at Oahu, Hawaii, when the Japanese attacked Pearl Harbor in December of that year. Kimes participated in the defense of the Ewa Field and was transferred to Midway Atoll to assume command of Marine Aircraft Group 22. While in this capacity, he was promoted to the rank of lieutenant colonel in May 1942.

He led his aircraft group during the Battle of Midway at the beginning of June 1942 and distinguished himself during the defense of the atoll. Kimes subsequently received the Navy Distinguished Service Medal.

His official Navy Distinguished Service Medal reads:

The President of the United States of America takes pleasure in presenting the Navy Distinguished Service Medal to Lieutenant Colonel Ira L. Kimes, United States Marine Corps, for exceptionally meritorious service to the Government of the United States in a duty of great responsibility as Commanding Officer of Marine Aircraft Group TWENTY-TWO (MAG-22), during the Battle of Midway, 4 to 5 June 1942. Although all facilities at Eastern Island were terrifically over-burdened, Lieutenant Colonel Kimes, by his untiring efforts and his outstanding professional skill, expedited smooth and efficient operations against the enemy. Despite the violent strafing and bombing on Eastern Island by enemy carrier-based aircraft on 4 June, our planes were re-serviced and rearmed in the minimum of time and with perfect coordination. His painstaking forethought in organization and his loyal devotion to duty were in keeping with the highest traditions of the United States Naval Service.

Following his promotion to colonel in December 1942, Kimes was ordered to Washington, D.C., and appointed executive officer of the Division of Aviation at Headquarters Marine Corps. He served under directors of marine aviation – major generals Ralph J. Mitchell and Roy S. Geiger – until he was transferred to command of Marine Corps Air Station, Quantico at the beginning of October 1943.

Kimes was transferred to the retired list due to failing health on February 1, 1945, and was advanced to the rank of brigadier general on the retired list for having been specially commended in combat.

Kimes died on February 3, 1949, and is buried at Arlington National Cemetery in Virginia.

== Decorations ==
Here is the ribbon bar of Brigadier General Ira L. Kimes:

Naval Aviator Badge
1st Row	Navy Distinguished Service Medal		Navy Presidential Unit Citation with one star
2nd Row	Marine Corps Expeditionary Medal	American Defense Service Medal with Base clasp	Asiatic-Pacific Campaign Medal with two 3/16 inch service stars
3rd Row	American Campaign Medal	World War II Victory Medal	Haitian National Order of Honour and Merit, rank Chevalier
