= Richard E. Fleming =

American Medal of Honor recipient (1917–1942)

Richard Eugene Fleming
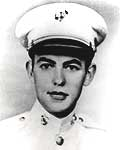
- Captain Richard E. Fleming, Medal of Honor recipient
- Born: November 2, 1917; Saint Paul, Minnesota
- Died: June 5, 1942 (aged 24); Midway, United States Minor Outlying Islands
- Burial place: At sea; memorial at Fort Snelling National Cemetery; memorial at the Punchbowl Cemetery
- Military career
- Allegiance: United States of America
- Branch: United States Marine Corps
- Service years: 1939–1942
- Rank: Captain
- Unit: Marine Scout Bomber Squadron 241 aka VMSB-241
- Conflicts: World War II: Battle of Midway †
- Awards: Medal of Honor

Captain Richard Eugene Fleming (November 2, 1917 – June 5, 1942) was a United States Marine who received the Medal of Honor for his heroism in World War II during the Battle of Midway. Fleming piloted a Vought SB2U Vindicator dive bomber in an attack on the Japanese cruiser Mikuma.

== Biography ==
Richard Fleming was born in Saint Paul, Minnesota, on November 2, 1917. He attended Saint Thomas Military Academy and graduated in the Class of 1935. During his senior year he was chosen as top student officer. From Saint Thomas, he entered the University of Minnesota and became president of Delta Kappa Epsilon fraternity. He received his Bachelor of Arts degree in 1939. Soon after graduation, he enlisted in the Marine Corps Reserve and applied for flight training. He was sent to the Naval Air Station in Pensacola, Florida, for training and finished at the top of his class in 1940. He was promoted to first lieutenant in April 1942 and to captain a month later.

Captain Fleming's first duty station was the Naval Air Base in San Diego, California. Ten days after the United States entered World War II, he flew from Pearl Harbor to Midway Island. He fought in the Battle of Midway as Flight Officer of Marine Scout Bombing Squadron 241. When squadron commander Lofton Henderson was shot down during the initial attack on a Japanese aircraft carrier, Fleming took command of the unit. The following day, June 5, 1942, Capt. Fleming led the second division of his squadron in a mass dive-bombing assault on the Mikuma. Leaving the remainder of his formation, he dived to the perilously low altitude of 400 ft (120 m), exposing himself to enemy fire in order to score a hit on the ship. Undeterred by a fateful approach glide, during which his plane was struck and set afire, he grimly pressed home his attack to an altitude of five hundred feet, released his bomb to score a near-miss on the stern of his target, then crashed to the sea in flames.

For "extraordinary heroism and conspicuous gallantry above and beyond the call of duty," Capt. Fleming was posthumously awarded the nation's highest military decoration — the Medal of Honor, while Pfc. Toms received the Distinguished Flying Cross. On November 24, 1942, President Franklin Roosevelt presented the Medal of Honor to Capt. Fleming's mother.

=== Postwar myths and clarifications regarding Fleming's attack ===
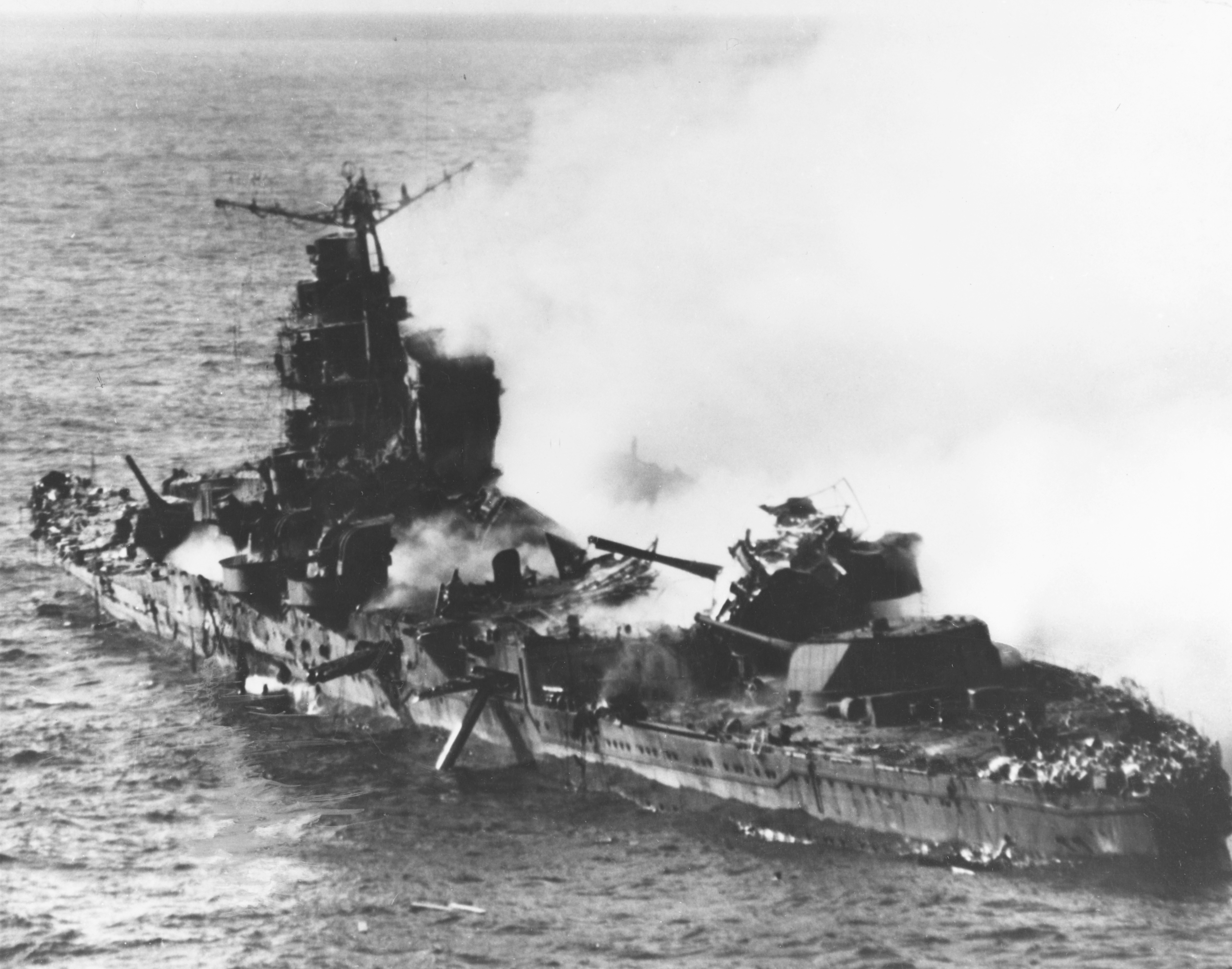
The Mikuma shortly before sinking

In "Midway: The Battle that Doomed Japan" Mitsuo Fuchida states, "the pilot (R.E. Fleming) after being hit by anti-aircraft fire, attempted a daring suicide crash into Mikuma's bridge. He missed the bridge but crashed into the after turret, spreading fire over the air intake of the starboard engine room. This caused an explosion of gas fumes below, killing all hands working in the engine room. This was a damaging blow to the cruiser, hitherto unscathed except for the slight hull damage received in the collision with Mogami." This source among others began perpetuating the myth that Fleming crashed into Mikuma after scoring a near-miss. However, Fuchida's account has been challenged by modern scholars, most notably by Jonathan Parshall and Anthony Tully for its many logic errors and inaccuracies. In this instance, Fuchida was not a witness to the attack as he was with the remnants of Kido Butai several hundred miles away.

The "battleship" attacked by Capt. Fleming was actually the heavy cruiser Mikuma. Despite the clear language in Fleming's Medal of Honor citation, which noted (correctly) his having achieved a near miss and then crashing into the sea, the common wisdom of the battle has often had Fleming striking Mikuma with his bomb, and then crashing his aircraft onto her aft turrets. This construction is based upon the eyewitness accounts of both a Japanese naval officer and Fleming's wingman. Some sources state that the wreckage of Fleming's plane is shown in the very famous image of Mikuma in a pre-sinking state on the early evening of June 6. Wreckage located on the roof of #4 turret has commonly been ascribed as that of Fleming's aircraft. However, Mikuma had suffered catastrophic damage from the detonation of her own Type 93 torpedo mounts, which were located immediately forward of the main battery turrets, on the main deck. The resulting explosions had largely destroyed the aft portion of Mikuma's funnel, as well as her rear superstructure and mainmast. This accounts for the wreckage on her turret roof. Similarly, the particulars of Mikuma's damage, as well as the American attacks against her, were very accurately recorded by the Japanese, and these sources make no mention of a hit by an enemy aircraft.

== Awards and honors ==
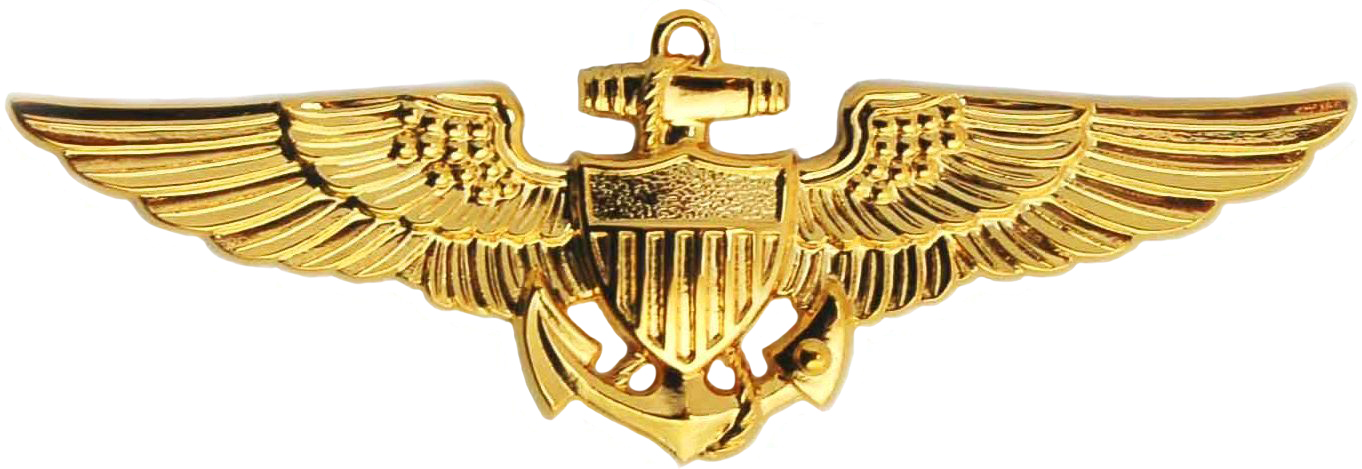

Badge	Naval Aviator Badge		
1st Row	Medal of Honor	Purple Heart	American Campaign Medal
2nd Row	American Defense Service Medal	Asiatic-Pacific Campaign Medal with 1 campaign star	World War II Victory Medal

=== Medal of Honor citation ===
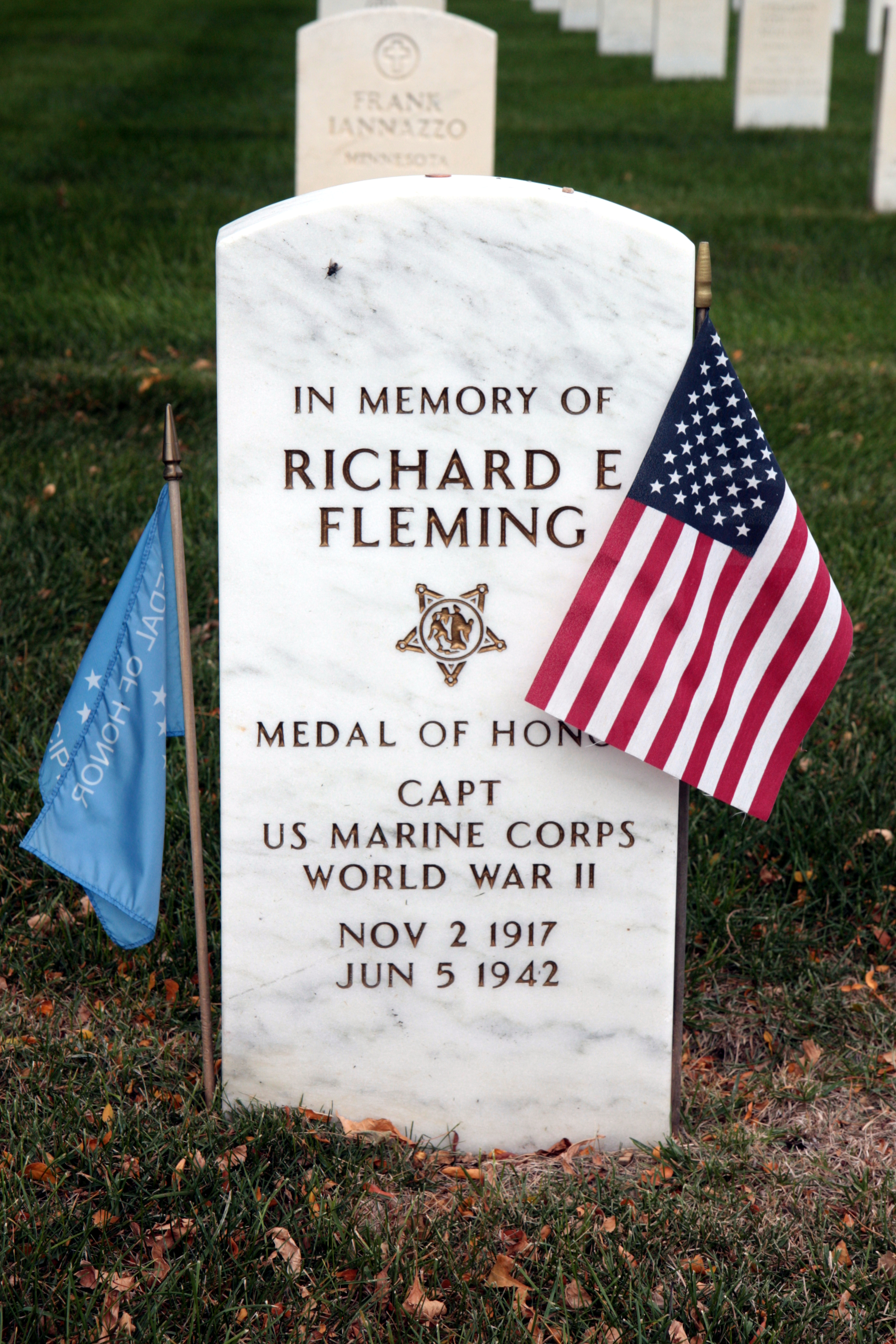
Fleming's marker at Fort Snelling National Cemetery

Captain Richard E. Fleming was posthumously awarded the Medal of Honor, the highest U.S. military award for valor. Fleming's citation, signed by President Franklin D. Roosevelt reads:

The President of the United States takes pride in presenting the MEDAL OF HONOR to

CAPTAIN RICHARD E. FLEMING
UNITED STATES MARINE CORPS RESERVE

for service as set forth in the following CITATION:

For extraordinary heroism and conspicuous intrepidity above and beyond the call of duty as Flight Officer, Marine Scout-Bombing Squadron TWO FORTY-ONE during action against enemy Japanese forces in the Battle of Midway on June 4 and 5, 1942. When his squadron Commander was shot down during the initial attack upon an enemy aircraft carrier, Captain Fleming led the remainder of the division with such fearless determination that he dived his own plane to the perilously low altitude of four hundred feet before releasing his bomb. Although his craft was riddled by 179 hits in the blistering hail of fire that burst upon him from Japanese fighter guns and antiaircraft batteries, he pulled out with only two minor wounds inflicted upon himself. On the night of June 4, when the Squadron Commander lost his way and became separated from the others, Captain Fleming brought his own plane in for a safe landing at its base despite hazardous weather conditions and total darkness. The following day, after less than four hours' sleep, he led the second division of his squadron in a coordinated glide-bombing and dive-bombing assault upon a Japanese battleship. Undeterred by a fateful approach glide, during which his ship was struck and set afire, he grimly pressed home his attack to an altitude of five hundred feet, released his bomb to score a near-miss on the stern of his target, then crashed to the sea in flames. His dauntless perseverance and unyielding devotion to duty were in keeping with the highest traditions of the United States Naval Service.

=== Honors ===
The United States Navy ship, the USS Fleming, DE-32, commissioned on September 18, 1943, was named in honor of Captain Fleming, and a memorial to him was placed at Fort Snelling National Cemetery. Captain Fleming's name is listed on the Tablets of the Missing at Honolulu Memorial in Honolulu, Hawaii.

Fleming is memorialized each year at his high school alma mater, Saint Thomas Academy. Each year during the Cadet Colonel promotion ceremony, he is remembered by the presentation of the "Fleming Saber", which is given to the Cadet Colonel.

Richard E. Fleming Field is the name for the South St. Paul Municipal Airport.

== See also ==
- List of Medal of Honor recipients
- List of Medal of Honor recipients for World War II
