= USS Henderson (DD-785) =

Gearing-class destroyer

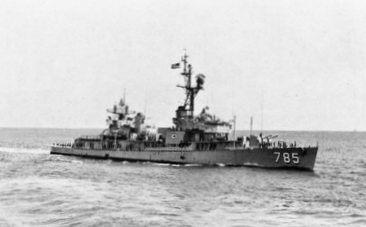
- USS Henderson (DD-785) in 1971

History

United States
- Name: USS Henderson
- Namesake: Lofton R. Henderson
- Builder: Todd Pacific Shipyards, Seattle, Washington
- Laid down: 27 October 1944
- Launched: 28 May 1945
- Commissioned: 4 August 1945
- Modernized: April 1962 (FRAM IB)
- Decommissioned: 30 September 1980
- Stricken: 30 September 1980
- Home port: Long Beach, CA
- Identification: Callsign: NKRI; Hull number: DD-785
- Nickname(s): Hendy Maru
- Honors and awards: 8 battle stars (Korea); 7 battle stars & Navy Unit Commendation (Vietnam)
- Fate: Sold to Pakistan, 1 October 1980

Pakistan
- Name: PNS Tughril (D167)
- Acquired: 1 October 1980
- Decommissioned: 2001
- Renamed: Nazim, 1998

General characteristics
- Class & type: Gearing-class destroyer
- Displacement: 3,460 long tons (3,516 t) full
- Length: 390 ft 6 in (119.02 m)
- Beam: 40 ft 10 in (12.45 m)
- Draft: 14 ft 4 in (4.37 m)
- Propulsion: Geared turbines, 2 shafts, 60,000 shp (45 MW)
- Speed: 35 knots (65 km/h; 40 mph)
- Range: 4,500 nmi (8,300 km) at 20 kn (37 km/h; 23 mph)
- Complement: 336
- Armament: As built : 6 × 5"/38 caliber guns; 12 × 40 mm AA guns; 11 × 20 mm AA guns; 10 × 21-inch (533 mm) torpedo tubes; After 1962 : 4 × 5"/38 caliber guns; 2 × triple Mark 32 Surface Vessel Torpedo Tubes; 1 × 8-cell ASROC box launcher; 1 × QH-50C DASH ASW drone helicopter carrying 2 × Mark 44 torpedoes

USS Henderson (DD-785) was a Gearing-class destroyer of the United States Navy, the second Navy ship of that name, and the first named for United States Marine Corps Major Lofton R. Henderson. The previous Henderson was named for Marine Corps Commandant Archibald Henderson.

Henderson was laid down by Todd Pacific Shipyards, Seattle, Washington, on 27 October 1944; launched on 28 May 1945; sponsored by Mrs. A. R. Early; and commissioned at Seattle on 4 August 1945.

== 1945–1964 ==
Henderson conducted shakedown cruise out of San Diego, then departed Seattle on 31 October for Hawaii. Upon her arrival on 7 November she operated as a screen ship for escort carriers in Hawaiian waters and conducted experimental sonar tests with submarines before returning to Naval Station San Diego on 23 April 1946. After divisional exercises off California she departed on 2 December 1946 for "Operation Highjump", an Antarctic exploration and test program. This operation included tests of clothing and equipment as well as mapping and weather work. Henderson reached Sydney, on 13 March 1947 and San Diego on 6 April 1947.

After two long cruises to the Pacific in support of U.S. occupation forces in Japan. Henderson departed San Diego on 5 August 1950 to join the United Nations forces in Korea. Arriving Yokosuka, Japan on 19 August she served as a screening ship for fast carrier forces whose aircraft flew ground support and other missions in Korea. As U.S. forces prepared to leap northward with the Inchon invasion, Henderson was with the assault forces. She steamed up Flying Fish Channel on 13 September, destroying mines and bombarding the Inchon waterfront preparatory to the invasion. The destroyers also traded blows with Communist shore batteries. The gunfire support group again entered the channel into Inchon Bay 14 to 15 September, softening up shore defenses. General of the Army Douglas MacArthur soon made signal as the Marines landed that day: "The Navy and Marines have never shone more brightly than this morning." Henderson remained on fire support duty at Inchon until 1 October.

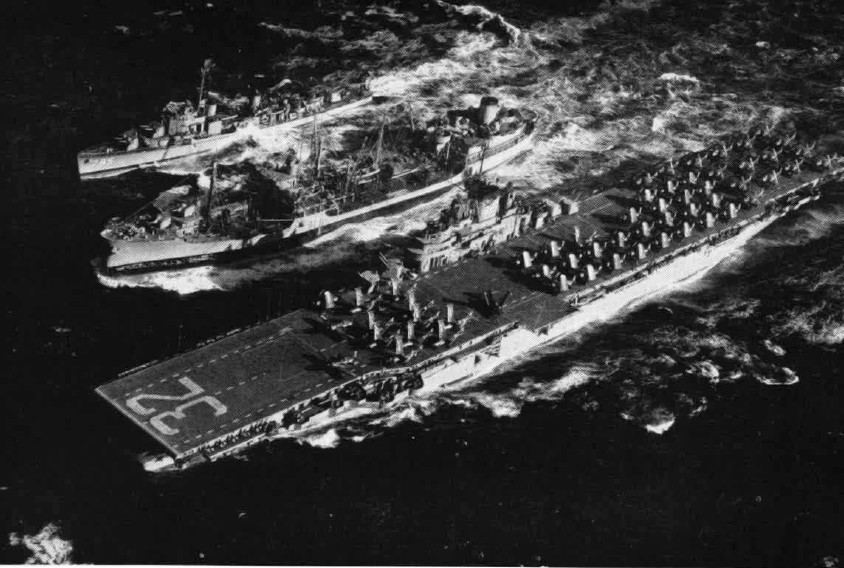
Henderson and the aircraft carrier USS Leyte (CV-32) being refueled off Korea between October 1950 and January 1951.

The destroyer returned to screening duty after Inchon, first along the coast of Korea and then in the Formosa Strait. This duty continued until she departed Keelung on 20 March, arriving San Diego on 7 April 1951. After coastwise exercises and a cruise to Hawaii for training, Henderson sailed on 4 January 1952 for her second tour of duty in Korea. She arrived off Hŭngnam on 16 February to take part in the blockade of that port and the coastal areas to the north. Her duties included gunfire support and bombardment of industrial sites until 7 March, when she screened carrier Bataan (CVL-29) off the coast of Japan. For the remainder of her tour Henderson operated with the fast carrier task forces around Korea and in the Formosa Strait. She departed Yokosuka on 25 July and arrived San Diego on 10 August 1952.

Henderson conducted training exercises off San Diego until 22 March 1953, when she departed for her third Korean tour. She took part in the siege of Wonsan harbor, supporting Korean troops with accurate and continuous gunfire, and conducted anti-submarine operations off Okinawa. The destroyer engaged in the vital coastal patrol, maintaining Allied control of the seas around Korea, until after the Korean armistice in July 1953. She arrived San Diego on 19 October 1953, after a total of 22 months of Korean duty.

Following Korea, Henderson established a pattern of cruises to the Far East, cruising to various crisis spots in the western Pacific for the next decade. Highlights of this phase of her service include protection of the Quemoy Islands from Communist aggression in September 1954, relief of Ceylonese flood victims in January 1958, and important fleet and individual exercises during her periods at sea. In 1959–60 Henderson continued to serve on "Formosa Patrol" protecting the Quemoy Islands and in May 1960 she served as station ship in Hong Kong. During her time in Hong Kong harbor she survived Typhoon Mary which was a direct hit on the area at that time.

== FRAM I ==
In the early 1960s Henderson was thoroughly modernized in the Fleet Rehabilitation and Modernization (FRAM) program. She received the FRAM I refit at the Mare Island Naval Shipyard, completed in April 1962. This modernization was to enable the World War II-destroyers to combat modern submarines.

This upgrade included rebuilding the ship's superstructure, engines, electronic systems, radar, sonar, and weapons. The No. 2 twin 5-inch turret was removed, as were all World War II torpedo launchers and 3-inch twin mounts. Upgraded systems included SQS-23 sonar, SPS-40 air search radar, two triple Mk 32 torpedo launchers, 8-cell ASROC box launcher, and QH-50C DASH ASW drone helicopter, with its own landing pad and hangar.

The Gyrodyne QH-50C DASH was an unmanned anti-submarine helicopter, controlled remotely from the ship. The drone could carry two MK.44 homing ASW torpedoes. During this era the ASROC system had an effective range of only 5 nautical miles (9 km), but the DASH drone should allow the ship to deploy ASW attack to sonar contacts as far as 22 nautical miles (41 km) away. . However, the FRAM refit did not improve defenses against aircraft, the air defense being taken over by the new guided missile-equipped ships.

== 1964–1980 ==
Commencing 11 August 1964, Henderson began annual cruises in Vietnamese waters, supporting the 7th Fleet amphibious and shore bombardment operations, and guarding aircraft carriers on "Yankee Station". She returned to Long Beach on 16 December, underwent modernization overhaul and intensive shore bombardment training, and returned to the intensified struggle in South Vietnam on 10 July 1965. During the next five months she ranged the South China Sea and Gulf of Tonkin while screening Oriskany (CV-34) and serving on the gun line. In December she steamed to the Gulf of Siam, where she conducted shore bombardment missions against Viet Cong positions on the Ca Mau Peninsula. As escort for Bon Homme Richard (CVA-31), the veteran destroyer departed Hong Kong on 26 December and arrived Long Beach on 13 January 1966.

Henderson spent the next year serving as an anti-submarine warfare (ASW) school ship out of San Diego and taking part in squadron exercises out of Long Beach. Late in July she joined in a massive, but unsuccessful air-sea search for the Hawaii-bound aircraft carrying Brigadier General Joseph Warren Stilwell, Jr., USA. After completing preparations for another WestPac deployment, she returned to the troubled waters of Southeast Asia in January 1967. Over the next four months she supported attack carrier operations and conducted more shore bombardment assignments. Henderson returned to Long Beach in mid-June, conducted ASW refresher training that summer and fall.

After a short restricted availability in early 1968, Henderson returned to Vietnam in April and resumed her familiar gunline and escort duties in the South China Sea. Interspersed with visits to Hong Kong, Subic Bay and Japan, Henderson remained there until 26 September when she arrived at Long Beach. During this tour of Asian waters Henderson also served with Bon Homme Richard (CVA-31) off the coast of North Korea in support of the captured Pueblo (AGER-2) as part of Operation Formation Star. Pueblo had previously been taken by the North Korean government while steaming in the Sea of Japan. Henderson received a regular overhaul alongside Isle Royale (AD-29) later in the year and a dry dock period at San Francisco January through March 1969, where she received new sonar and communications equipment.

After completing the overhaul in May, Henderson spent the summer and fall conducting refresher training before deploying to the Far East on 18 November. Caught in a storm near Midway Island, the destroyer suffered damage to the forward 5-inch gun mount and diverted to Yokosuka for repairs. After a brief yard period the destroyer then spent several weeks on patrol off the Korean peninsula, as tensions remained high following the shoot down of a U.S. reconnaissance aircraft the previous year. Henderson then spent three months off Vietnam, supporting riverine operations and participating in "Operation Ringmaster I". During this period, the destroyer also rescued six passengers from an SH-3 Sea King helicopter that crashed while en route from Da Nang to Constellation (CVA-64).

Returning to Long Beach on 8 May, Henderson underwent several months of inspections and certifications, which ultimately kept the warship in service in contrast to the mass 1970s decommissioning of many of her war-built sister ships. Following training and preparations that fall, Henderson departed for her sixth Vietnam deployment on 26 January 1971. Arriving in theater on 22 February, she served on the gunline and on "Yankee Station", both familiar assignments. In a change of pace, the destroyer participated in an ASW exercise at one point and successfully fired an exercise torpedo against diesel-electric submarine Sailfish (SS-572). In April, Henderson conducted a variety of duties, including serving as naval gunfire support school ship at the Tabones range in the Philippines, conducting a short surveillance patrol in the Paracel Islands and visiting ports in Taiwan. Departing the region on 30 June, the destroyer swung south for visits to Manus Island, Papua New Guinea; Cairns and Sydney, Australia; Auckland, New Zealand; and Pago Pago, American Samoa; before arriving home in Long Beach on 10 August.

The destroyer began another major overhaul at Long Beach that winter and began pre-deployment preparations starting in July 1972. The warship sailed on her seventh and final Vietnam tour on 16 November, arriving in Da Nang harbor on 14 December. She spent the next few weeks conducting naval gunfire support missions, including one gunnery duel with an enemy battery on Christmas Eve that earned her the Combat Action Ribbon. On New Year's Eve, the destroyer's motor whaleboat rescued four crewmen from a crashed SH-3 helicopter. After port visits to Singapore, Thailand and Hong Kong during truce talks, Henderson steamed into the Gulf of Tonkin for "Operation End Sweep" in April 1973. After helping minesweepers clear Haiphong harbor, the warship sailed for home, arriving in Long Beach on 26 May.

After participating in two fleet exercises that summer and fall, Henderson was retired from active duty and assigned to the Naval Reserve Fleet in Destroyer Squadron 27 (DesRon 27) on 1 October. She then moved into Long Beach Naval Shipyard for conversion to Navy distillate fuel. The active duty crew was also reduced in number and the ship only reached a full complement on drill weekends.

Henderson spent the next six years conducting reserve training operations out of Long Beach. The destroyer spent the majority of her time sailing in local operating areas, though the warship also conducted reserve unit training cruises to Pearl Harbor or the Pacific Northwest on an annual basis. Highlights of this period included visits to the Portland Rose Festival (where the ship was "streaked" on one occasion by two "lassies" on a nearby cabin cruiser), being struck by a practice torpedo fired by Salmon (SS-573), and a series of excellent inspections that extended the service life of the destroyer through the end of the decade.

== Pakistan service ==
Henderson decommissioned on 30 September 1980, was struck from the Navy list that same day and sold to Pakistan on 1 October 1980. The destroyer served in the Pakistan Navy as PNS Tughril (167). She was renamed Nazim and transferred to the Pakistan Maritime Security Agency (MSA) in 1998 at Karachi. The ship was finally decommissioned in 2001.

== Awards ==
Henderson received eight battle stars for Korean War service, seven battle stars for Vietnam War service, and shared in the Navy Unit Commendation given her task unit for its part in the Inchon landings.
