= South St. Paul Municipal Airport =

South St. Paul Municipal Airport Richard E. Fleming Field
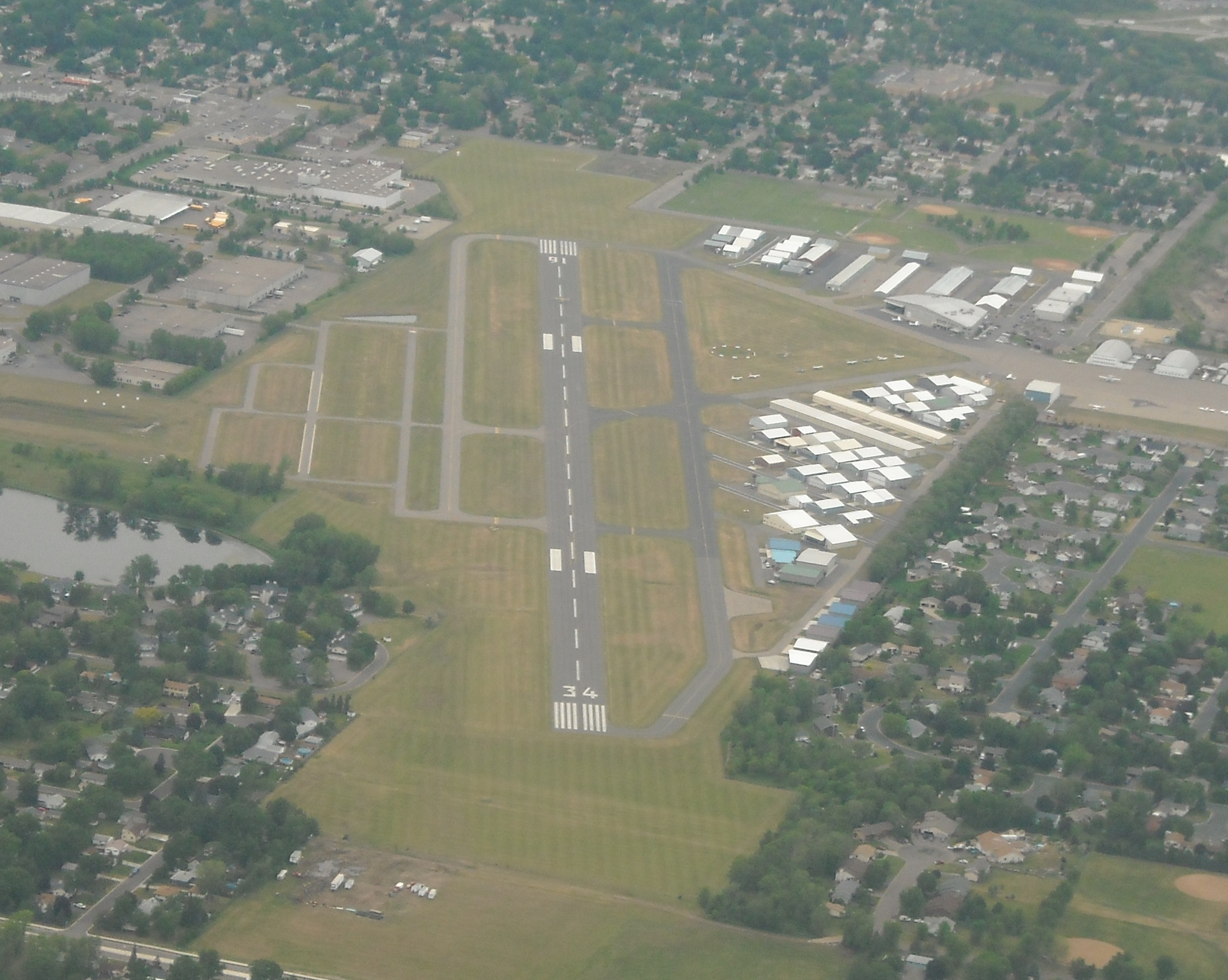

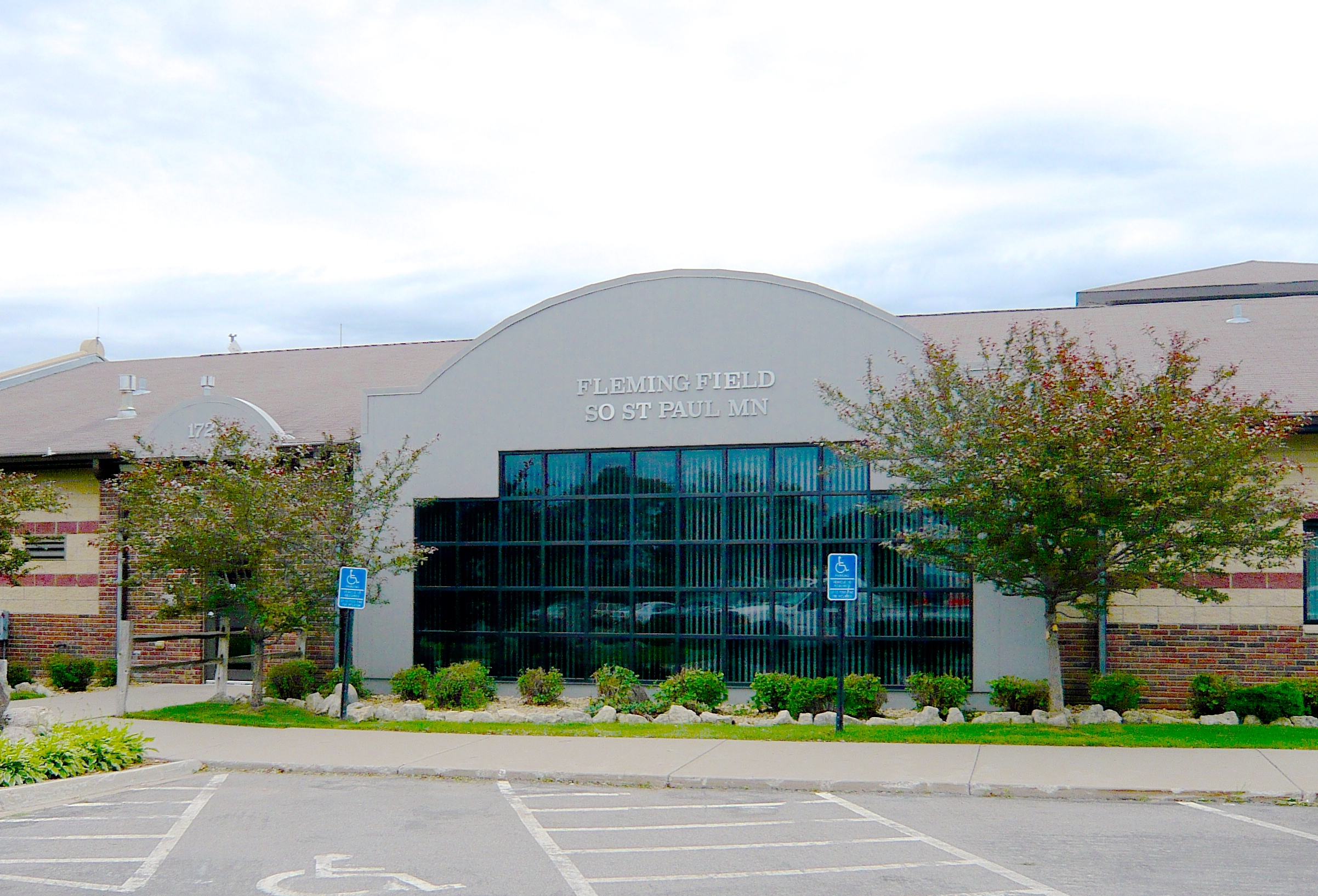
- IATA: none; ICAO: KSGS; FAA LID: SGS

Summary
- Airport type: Public
- Owner: City of South St. Paul
- Serves: South St. Paul, Minnesota
- Elevation AMSL: 820 ft / 250 m
- Website: www.flemingfield.com

Map
- Location of airport in Minnesota / United States SGS (the United States)

Runways
Direction	Length		Surface
Direction	ft	m	Surface
16/34	4,002	1,220	Asphalt

Statistics
- Aircraft operations (2016): 51,000
- Based aircraft (2017): 401
- Source: Federal Aviation Administration

South St. Paul Municipal Airport (ICAO: KSGS, FAA LID: SGS), also known as Richard E. Fleming Field or simply Fleming Field, is a city-owned public-use airport located two miles (3 km) south of the central business district of South St. Paul, a city in Dakota County, Minnesota, United States. It is named for Richard E. Fleming, a United States Marine Corps Naval Aviator during World War II who was posthumously awarded a Medal of Honor. It is the only reliever airport for Minneapolis–St. Paul International Airport that is not operated by the Metropolitan Airports Commission.

Although most U.S. airports use the same three-letter location identifier for the FAA and IATA, South St. Paul Municipal Airport is assigned SGS by the FAA but has no designation from the IATA.

Over the decade of 1950 and 1960 the airport was the main launch center for Winzen Research Inc. One of the most important companies devoted to the construction and operation of stratospheric balloons. The proximity to their headquarters in Minneapolis, made the ideal place for testing of new balloon models, as well as for technological flights and a number of scientific experiments.

In 1957, Fleming Field was the site chosen to launch the first manned flight of Project Manhigh of the Air Force, commanded by Lieutenant Joseph Kittinger. According to our records the latest balloons flights from there dating from the mid 60's.

The airport is host to a museum with a collection of World War II aircraft.

== Facilities and aircraft ==
South St. Paul Municipal-Richard E. Fleming Field covers an area of 270 acres (110 ha) and contains one asphalt paved runway designated 16/34 which measures 4,002 x 100 ft (1,220 x 30 m). For the 12-month period ending May 31, 2016, the airport had 51,000 general aviation aircraft operations, an average of 140 per day. In January 2017, there were 401 aircraft based at this airport: 375 single-engine, 20 multi-engine and 6 helicopter.

== See also ==
- List of airports in Minnesota
