= Japanese cruiser Mikuma =

Ship of the Mogami-class of cruisers

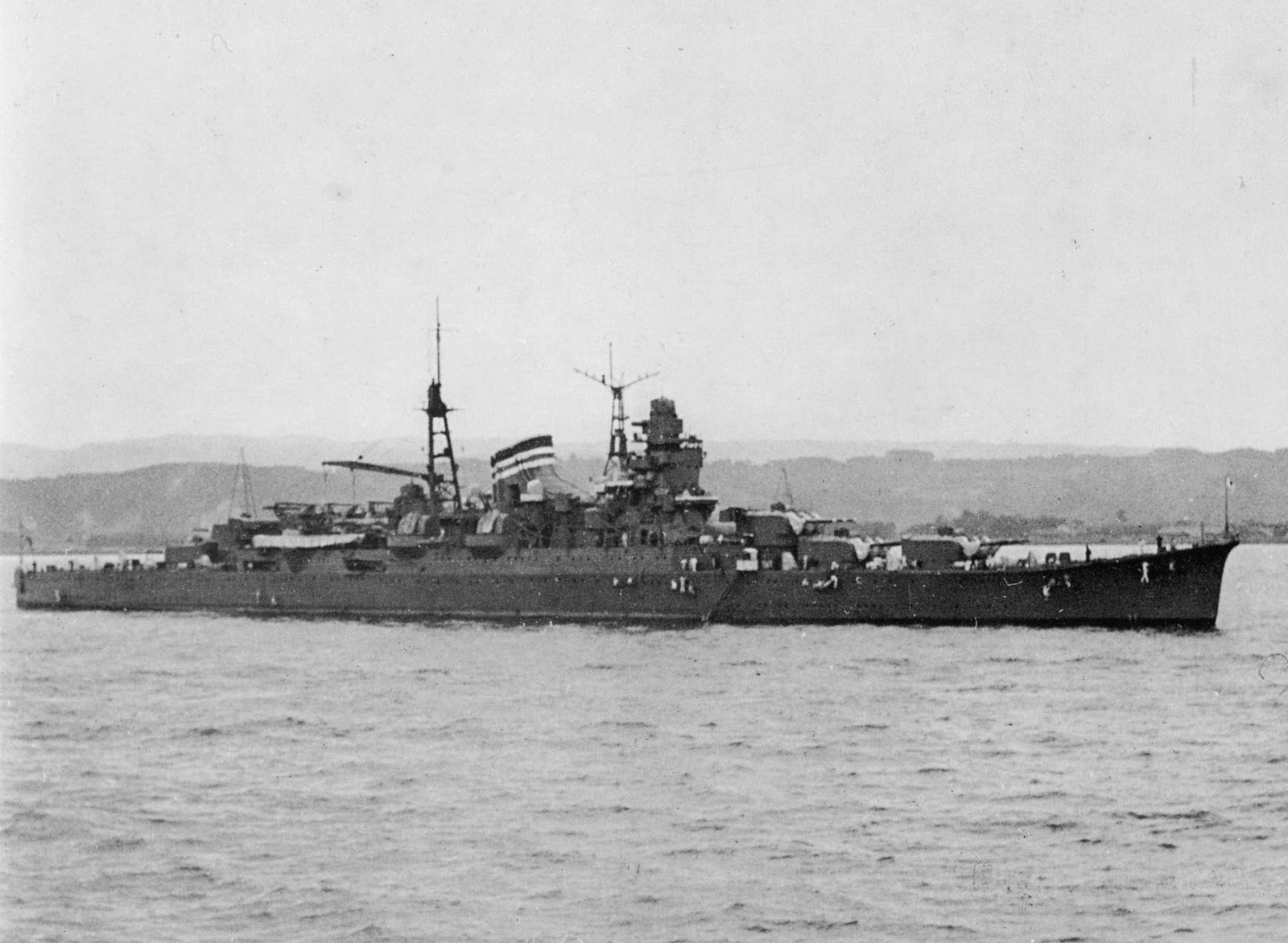
- Mikuma in Kagoshima Harbor, 1939

History

Empire of Japan
- Name: Mikuma
- Namesake: Mikuma River
- Ordered: 1931 Fiscal Year
- Builder: Mitsubishi
- Laid down: 24 December 1931
- Launched: 31 May 1934
- Commissioned: 29 August 1935
- Stricken: 10 August 1942
- Fate: Sunk by American aircraft during Battle of Midway, 6 June 1942

General characteristics
- Class & type: Mogami-class cruiser
- Displacement: 8,500 tons (official, initial); 13,668 tons (final)
- Length: 197 metres (646 ft 4 in) (initial); 198 metres (649 ft 7 in) (final)
- Beam: 18 metres (59 ft 1 in) (initial); 20.2 metres (66 ft 3 in) (final)
- Draught: 5.5 metres (18 ft 1 in) (initial); 5.9 metres (19 ft 4 in) (final)
- Propulsion: 4-shaft geared turbines; 10 Kampon boilers; 152,000 shp (113,000 kW)
- Speed: 37 knots (69 km/h; 43 mph) (initial); 34.9 knots (64.6 km/h; 40.2 mph) (final)
- Range: 8,000 nmi (15,000 km; 9,200 mi) at 14 knots (26 km/h; 16 mph)
- Complement: 850
- Armament: (initial); 15 × 155 mm (6 in)/60 cal guns (5x3); 8 × 127 mm (5 in)/40 cal guns (4x2); 4 × 40 mm (1.6 in) AA guns; 12 × 610 mm (24 in) torpedo tubes; (final); 10 × 20.3 cm (8.0 in)/50 3rd Year Type naval guns (5x2); 8 × 127 mm (5.0 in)/40 cal guns (4x2); 8 × 25 mm (0.98 in) AA guns; 4 × 13.2 mm (0.52 in) AA guns; 12 × 610 mm (24 in) torpedo tubes
- Armor: Belt 100–125 mm (3.9–4.9 in); Deck 35–60 mm (1.4–2.4 in); Turret 25 mm (0.98 in)
- Aircraft carried: 3 x floatplanes

Mikuma (Japanese: 三隈; named after Mikuma River) was a heavy cruiser of the Imperial Japanese Navy. The second vessel in the four-ship Mogami class, she was laid down in 1931 and commissioned in 1935. During World War II she participated in the Battle of Sunda Strait in February 1942 and the Battle of Midway in June 1942, and was sunk the last day of the latter engagement, on 6 June.

== Background ==
Built under the 1931 Fleet Replenishment Program, the Mogami-class cruisers were designed to the maximum limits allowed by the Washington Naval Treaty, using the latest technology. This resulted in the choice of a 155 mm dual purpose (DP) main battery in five triple turrets capable of 55° elevation. To save weight, electric welding was used, as was aluminum in the superstructure, and the use of a single funnel stack. New impulse geared turbine engines, coupled with ultimately heavy anti-aircraft protection, gave the class a very high speed and protection. However, the Mogami class was also plagued with technical problems due to its untested equipment and proved to be unstable and top-heavy as well, due to cramming too much equipment into a comparatively small hull.

== Service career ==
=== Early career ===
Mikuma was completed at Mitsubishi's Nagasaki shipyards on 29 August 1935. Following the Japanese ship-naming conventions, the ship was named after the Mikuma river in Oita prefecture, Japan.

Beginning in 1939, Mikuma was brought in for substantial reconstruction, replacing the triple 155-millimetre (6 in) turrets with twin 203 mm (8 in) guns (the 155 mm turrets going to the battleship Yamato). Torpedo bulges were also added to improve stability, but the increased displacement caused a reduction in speed.

Mikuma participated in the occupation of Cochinchina, French Indochina, after Japan and Vichy French authorities reached an understanding on use of its air facilities and harbors from July 1941, from its forward operating base on Hainan. At the time of the attack on Pearl Harbor, Mikuma was assigned to cover the invasion of Malaya as part of Cruiser Division 7 under Vice Admiral Jisaburo Ozawa's First Southern Expeditionary Fleet, providing close support for landings of Japanese troops at Singora, Pattani and Kota Bharu.

In December 1941, Mikuma was tasked with the invasion of British Borneo, together with Mogami, covering landings of Japanese troops at Miri and Kuching. In February 1942, Mikuma was tasked with covering landings of Japanese troops in Sumatra and Java. On 10 February, Mikuma and Chōkai were attacked by the submarine USS Searaven, which fired four torpedoes, but missed.

=== Battle of Sunda Strait ===
At 2300 on 28 February 1942, Mikuma and Mogami, destroyer Shikinami, light cruiser Natori and destroyers Shirakumo, Murakumo, Shirayuki, Hatsuyuki and Asakaze arrived and engaged the cruisers USS Houston and HMAS Perth with gunfire and torpedoes after the Allied vessels attacked Japanese transports in the Sunda Strait. At 2355, Houston scored hits on Mikuma that knocked out her electrical power, but it was quickly restored. During the battle, Mikuma lost six men and eleven others were wounded. Both Houston and Perth were sunk during the engagement, as was transport Ryujo Maru with IJA 16th Army commander Lieutenant General Hitoshi Imamura—although the general survived the sinking.

In March, Mikuma and Cruiser Division 7 were based at Singapore to cover Japanese landings in Sumatra and the seizure of the Andaman Islands.

From 1 April 1942 Cruiser Division 7 based from Mergui joined with Cruiser Division 4 to participate in the Indian Ocean raids. Mikuma, Mogami and destroyer Amagiri detached and formed the Southern Group, which hunted for merchant shipping in the Bay of Bengal, while Chōkai, Destroyer Squadron 4's light cruiser Yura and destroyers Ayanami, Yūgiri, Asagiri and Shiokaze covered the northern areas. During the operation, the Southern Group claimed kills on 7,726-ton British passenger ship Dardanus and 5,281-ton British steamship Ganara and the 6,622-ton British merchant vessel Indora, en route from Calcutta to Mauritius.

On 22 April, Cruiser Division 7 returned to Kure, and Mikuma went into dry dock for overhaul. On 26 May, Cruiser Division 7 arrived at Guam to provide close support for Rear Admiral Raizo Tanaka's Midway Invasion Transport Group. Mikuma's crew was advised that upon the completion of the Midway operation they would proceed to the Aleutian Islands and from there to Australia.

=== Battle of Midway ===
Mikuma sailed for the invasion of Midway under the command of Captain Sakiyama Shakao, former skipper of the cruiser Abukuma, as part of Cruiser Division 7. On 5 June, Admiral Isoroku Yamamoto, CINC of the Combined Fleet ordered Cruiser Division 7 to shell Midway in preparation for a Japanese landing. Cruiser Division 7 and DesDiv 8, 410 nautical miles (760 km; 470 mi) from the island, began a high-speed dash at 35 knots (65 km/h; 40 mph) to get into position. The destroyers lagged behind in choppy seas, and at 2120 the order was canceled. Due to a mix up, Cruiser Division 7 didn't receive the order until 0210 on 6 June when it was just 50 miles (80 km) from Midway. This placed Cruiser Division 7 within range of the submarine USS Tambor, which was spotted by the cruiser Kumano.

==== Collision ====
Kumano signaled a submarine alert and directed the formation to conduct evasive maneuvers to port, throwing the squadron into confusion. Kumano briefly turned sharply to port, heading west, then turned slightly starboard back to north. Suzuya followed her, coursed slightly less to port, and found herself steaming directly for Kumano. A sharp turn to starboard narrowly avoided a collision. Mikuma attempted to mirror the movements of Suzuya, turning to port and then further to port after witnessing Suzuya maneuvering to avoid the formation's flagship. Mogami at the rear of the formation had made a turn to port and maintained a straight course heading north-west. Mikuma's final turn to port brought her into the course of Mogami which did not sight Mikuma in the darkness until she was very close, moving across her starboard bow. Captain Soji of Mogami attempted a sharp turn to port, too late to prevent Mogami from ramming Mikuma's port side below the bridge. Mogami's bow caved in and she was badly damaged. Mikuma's port side oil tanks ruptured and spilled oil, but otherwise her damage was slight, as the last-second port side turn deflected Mogami's bow along an angle from Mikuma's port side. With her damaged bow, Mogami could make only 12 knots (22 km/h; 14 mph), and was generally unwieldy and clumsy.

==== Retreat ====
The destroyers Arashio and Asashio of DesDiv 8, which had steamed ahead with the Suzuya and Kumano at high speed to escape the range of Midway's aircraft, were ordered by Kurita to reverse course and escort Mogami and Mikuma. At 0630, a PBY Catalina spotted the stragglers, thanks to the massive oil trail leaking from Mikuma, and radioed their coordinates to Admiral Spruance. Throughout the day, in an aura of great confusion, many American sighting reports misidentified one of the two ships as a battleship.

==== Air attacks from Midway ====
Sightings of the flagship of CruDiv 7 steaming at high speed to the north-west, combined with reports of battleships and suspicions of a fifth carrier, convinced Spruance and his Task Force 16 staff that this faster force contained a battleship. Midway hastily launched the remnants of VMSB-241 containing 6 SBD Dauntlesses and 6 SB2Us. The aircraft travelled in two wings just 40 miles and found the two cruisers. Despite her damaged bow and greatly reduced speed, Mogami began evasive maneuvers along with Mikuma and received no hits from the Dauntless section. Capt. Richard Fleming's Vindicator section executed a glide bombing attack. Accurate and effective anti-aircraft fire from the ships shot down Fleming's bomber. Almost as soon as this attack ended, eight Boeing B-17 level bombers operating out of Midway, led by Lt. Col. Brooke E. Allen, attacked the two cruisers, flying in two sections of four aircraft. Their attack, which scored no hits of 39 bombs dropped, concluded at around 0830.

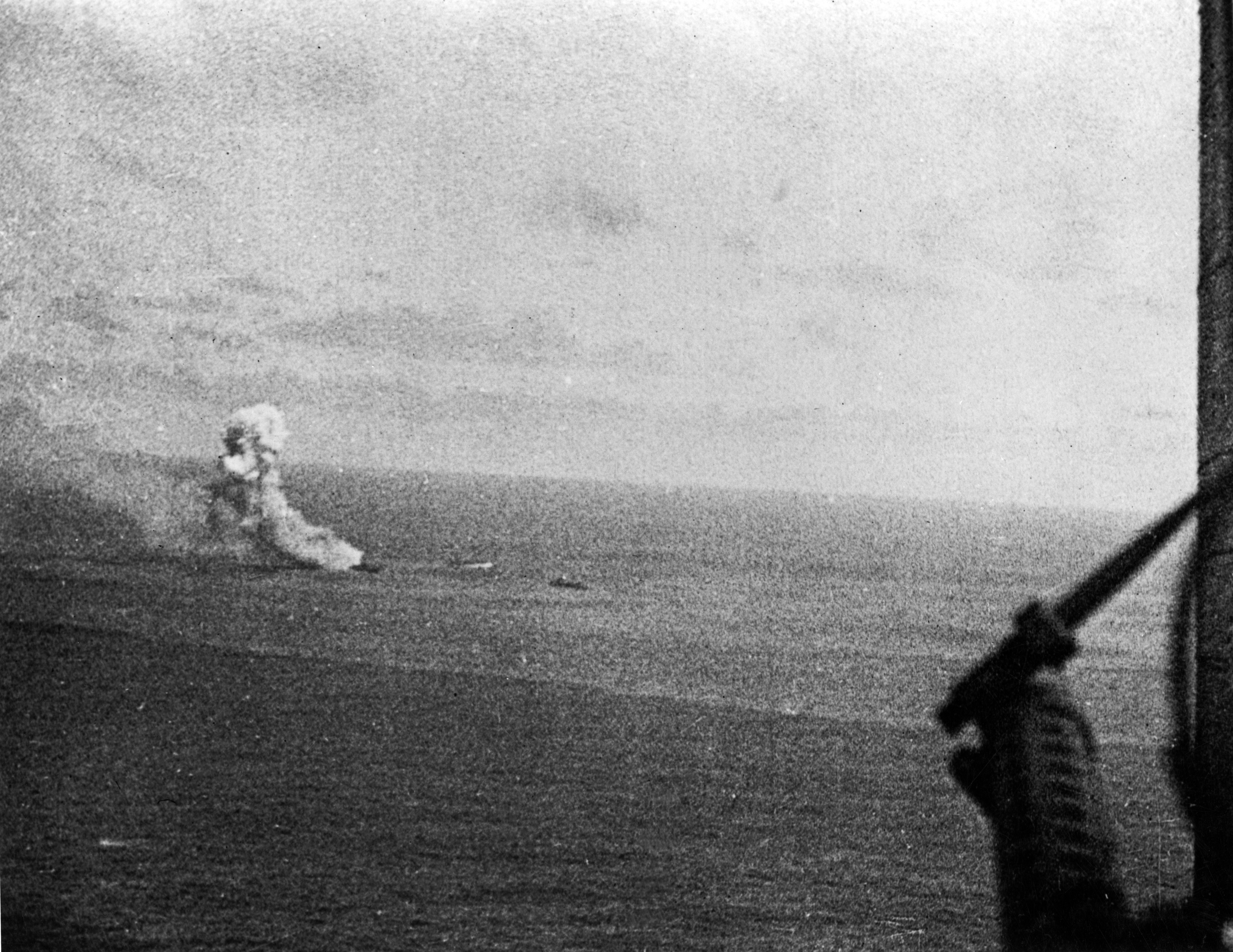
Mikuma seen burning from an American dive bomber attacks. Mogami is visible to the right, and Arashio faintly visible between them, 1500-25, June 6, 1942.

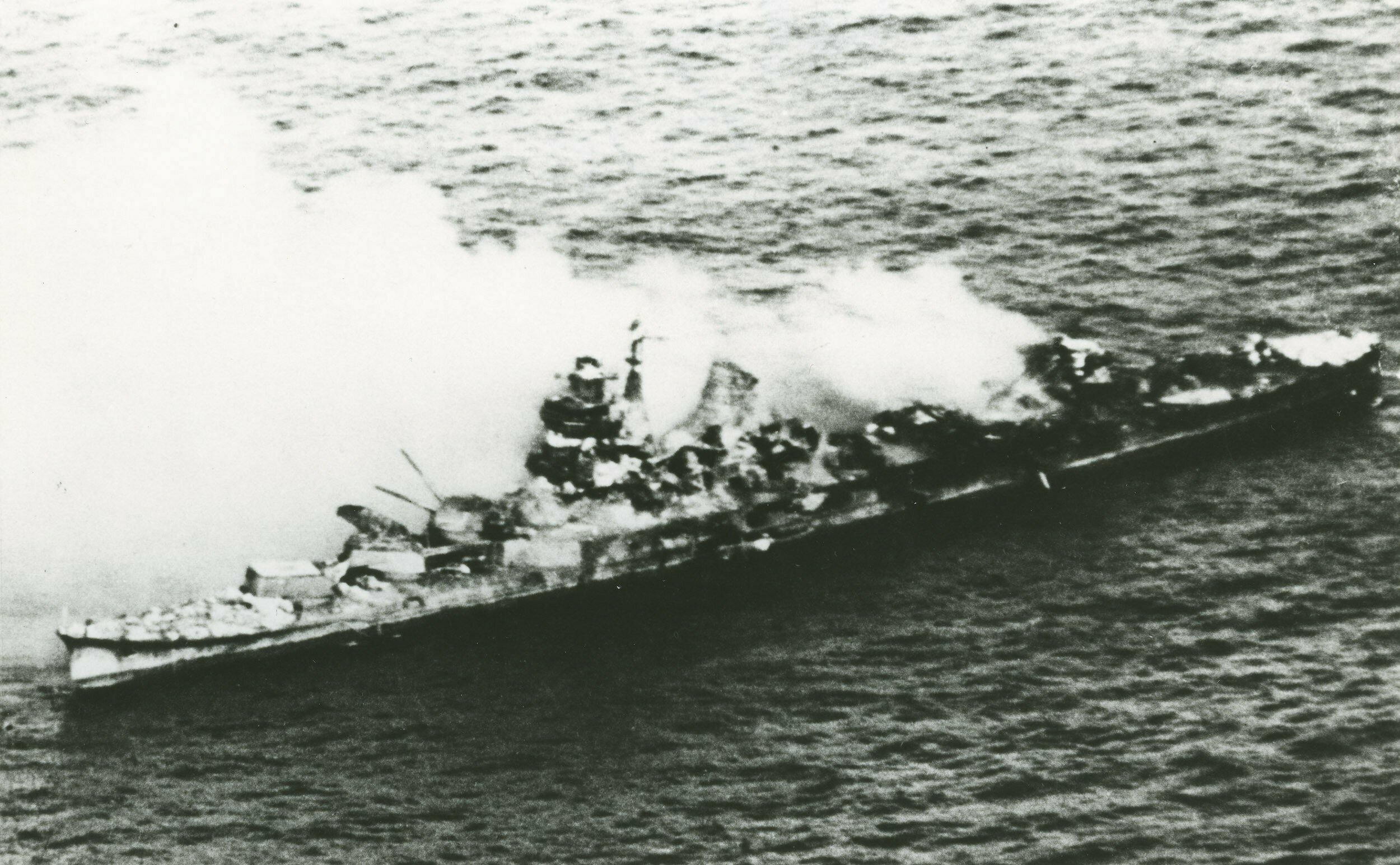
Mikuma heavily damaged, dead in the water, on fire

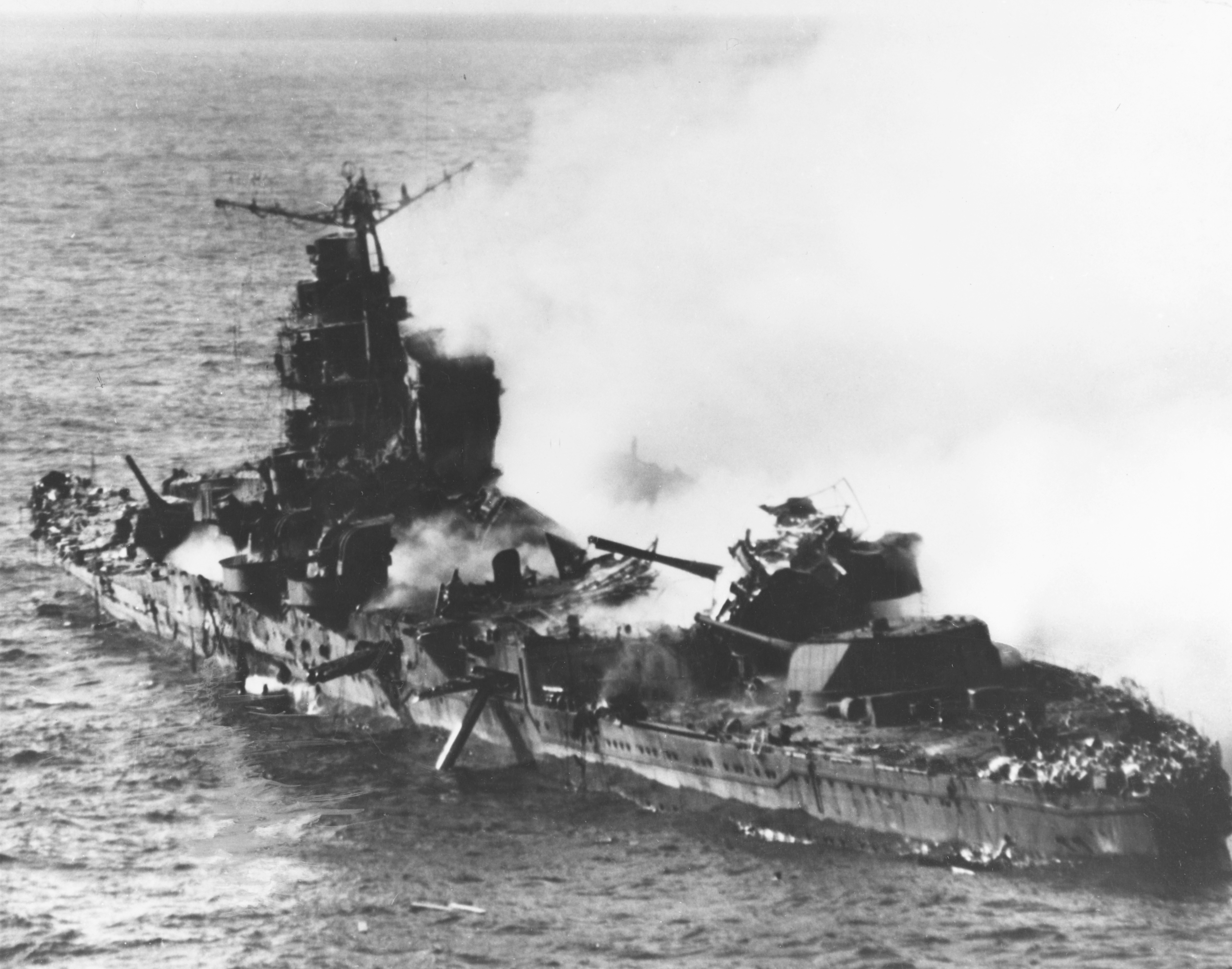
Mikuma burning and listing to port two hours before sinking. Note her completely destroyed midsection.

==== June 6: first attack by American carriers ====
The following morning, 6 June 1942, Mikuma and Mogami were still heading due west instead of north-west where the combined fleet was converging, hoping to come within 700 km (430 mi) range of Wake Island's fighter air cover. Hornet's 26 dive bombers arrived first, and at first ignored the two cruisers and searched for the alleged battleship ahead of this force, but having found nothing they circled back to the two cruisers and commenced their attacks. All bombing attempts on Mikuma missed, but two bombs struck Mogami, hitting one of her 8-inch turrets and the aircraft deck. The latter bomb started a potentially fatal fire in the torpedo room below the aviation facility, but Mogami's damage control officer had already ordered all torpedoes jettisoned. Anti-aircraft fire from the force shot down two of Hornet's SBD Dauntless aircraft. The captain of the Mogami pushed the damaged ship's speed up to 20 knots (37 km/h; 23 mph) to hurry out of the danger zone.

==== June 6: second wave ====
At 1045 a composite force of 31 dive bombers launched from Enterprise to seek the purported battleship in the area spotted the two stragglers. The force was escorted by 12 Wildcats and 3 TBD Devastator torpedo bombers. The force was under the command of Wallace "Wally" Short of Yorktown (some of her aircraft had been forced to land at Task Force 16 after their ship was abandoned). The dive bombers once again bypassed CruDiv 7 to search for the battleship, which was not located. Anti-aircraft fire from the cruisers forced the escorting Wildcats to retreat out of range. The Wildcat formation leader radioed the dive bombers that one ship appeared to be a battleship (perhaps owing to the contrast between the two cruisers presented by Mogami's shattered bow) and the dive bomber formation reversed course to attack. Willy Short, leading the dive bombers, wanted to circle and attack with the sun behind them, a favored dive bombing practice, but his rear section, VB-3, detached and attacked the rearmost cruiser (Mogami), planting 2 bombs in her at 1230. The rest of Short's dive bombers attacked Mikuma from 14,000 ft (4,300 m), and caught her coming out of a sharp starboard turn. Braving a torrent of anti-aircraft fire, the bombers delivered two hits. The first struck her No.3 turret; the explosion killed many of the officers on the bridge, including the commander of the starboard anti-aircraft batteries, and injured her captain severely enough to render him unconscious. Mikuma's executive officer Takashima Hideo took command of the cruiser. The second bomb crashed through the deck and disabled the starboard forward engine rooms. Immediately after, two more bombs hit her aviation deck and exploded in the port aft engine room, starting a fire near her torpedo room. Mikuma was now dead in the water. The attacking planes left (the three TBD Devastator torpedo bombers did not join the attack, having been instructed to not attack anything that could respond with anti-aircraft fire).

==== On fire and abandoned ====
At 1358, the fire amidships Mikuma reached the torpedoes and triggered a chain of massive secondary explosions, ending the possibility of towing the ship away. At 1420 Mogami radioed the combined fleet that Mikuma was in dire straits. The secondary explosions left Mikuma's aft-amidships section and the aviation facility unrecognizable. The mast and superstructure atop the bridge collapsed and crashed into the burning aviation compartment. Though it wasn't obvious at the time, the bomb hit on the port machinery spaces also ruptured the ship below the waterline, and she began taking on water. Mikuma continued fire fighting efforts but approximately 30 minutes later the ship's executive officer Takashima concluded there was no hope of saving the sinking ship and gave the order to abandon her. Takashima ordered the repair parties to throw shoring wood and other materials overboard to construct life rafts. Mogami and Arashio were close to Mikuma but maintained a safe distance as Mikuma was still burning and exploding, so the crews of Mikuma would have to swim over to the ships or use life rafts and launches to reach Arashio and Mogami. In the meanwhile Asashio patrolled in a circle around them to screen the ships from air or submarine attack. The ship's severely wounded captain Sakiyama was lowered on the first life raft, the ship's paymaster and air officers followed with the ship's important documents. The rafts launched toward Arashio. Takashima remained in the ship's smoke-filled bridge to go down with the ship. The ship's main battery fire control director commander, Lt. Koyama Masao, committed Hara-Kiri on top of the forward gun turret, ashamed his guns couldn't engage the enemy.

==== Final air attack ====
A few minutes after Takashima gave the order to abandon ship, the ships were set upon by yet another dive bombing attack. At 1445, 23 Dauntlesses from Hornet that had been launched at 1330 arrived. Arashio and Mogami immediately commenced evasive maneuvers, leaving many of Mikuma's crew in the water. The dive bombers attacked at 1500. Mogami and Arashio lacked time to get underway and were both hit along with the burning Mikuma. A bomb hitting Arashio exploded among the surviving crew of Mikuma pulled from the water, killing 37 men outright and damaging her steering badly enough to force a switch to manual steering. Cdr. Ogawa Nobuki, commander of DesDiv8 was also wounded. Mogami was hit near the seaplane deck, starting a fire near the sick bay that killed almost all of the ship's doctors and orderlies. The fire was quickly contained but most of the casualties in sick bay were lost. Asashio was not hit by the bombing attack but lost 22 men to strafing.

==== Final flight of the task force and sinking ====
Realizing the urgency of the situation, Captain Akira Soji, then in command of the detachment, communicated to the Combined Fleet to inform them of the attack, and immediately set course west to vacate the area before more air attacks occurred, leaving most of Mikuma's crew in the water, Mogami and the two destroyers of DesDiv8 sailed away from her, having had time to rescue only 239 of her crew, including her dying captain Sakiyama. Mikuma continued to drift and burn for at least 4 more hours. Owing to the great confusion among American sighting report the past 2 days, Admiral Spruance of Task Force 16 ordered two recon Dauntlesses with cameras launched from Enterprise at 1553 to ascertain whether this damaged ship was indeed the alleged battleship reported by multiple reconnaissance airplanes. The Dauntlesses arrived over the burning Mikuma at 1715, just before dusk, and took photographs and film footage of her at extremely low altitude. The Dauntlesses recorded her position at 29°-28'N, 173°-11'E. A survivor recalled that Mikuma's port list began increasing rapidly at dusk, and at approximately 1930 she finally turned over on her portside and sank at 29°20′N 173°30′E. She was the first Japanese cruiser to be sunk during the war. Only 188 of Mikuma's crew survived the ordeal; her captain also succumbed 3 days later to his wounds while he was aboard Suzuya. Captain Soji later ordered Asashio to reverse course and go back to Mikuma and make every effort to save any of her surviving crews. Asashio made her way back to Mikuma's location but found nothing, and promptly returned to CruDiv7, according to her log she found nothing but a great patch of oil and "not one survivor could be rescued". However, two of Mikuma's crew would be rescued by USS Trout (SS-202) on 9 June, the only survivors on a life raft that originally held seventeen.

Owing to the secrecy and attempted cover-up of the disaster at Midway, the General Navy Headquarters would list Mikuma as "heavily damaged" rather than sunk, and then temporarily listed her as "unmanned" before being struck off the navy list at 10 August 1942.
