= Lofton R. Henderson =

United States Marine Corps aviator

Lofton Russell Henderson
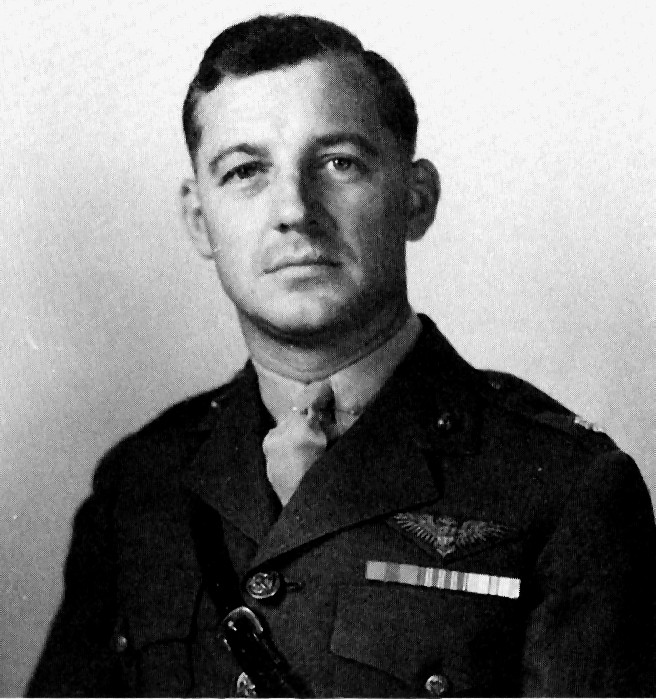
- Born: May 24, 1903; Lorain, Ohio, U.S.
- Died: June 4, 1942 (aged 39) off Midway Atoll
- Military career
- Allegiance: United States of America
- Branch: United States Marine Corps
- Service years: 1926 – 1942
- Rank: Major
- Nickname: Joe
- Commands: VMSB-241
- Conflicts: World War II: Battle of Midway †
- Awards: Navy Cross; Purple Heart

Lofton Russell Henderson (May 24, 1903 – June 4, 1942) was a United States Marine Corps aviator during World War II. He commanded Marine Scout Bombing Squadron 241 (VMSB-241) at the Battle of Midway and died while leading his squadron in an attack against Japanese aircraft carriers.

== Biography ==
=== Early years ===
Lofton Henderson was born on May 24, 1903, in Lorain, Ohio. He attended Lorain High School and was captain of the football team. He graduated from the United States Naval Academy in 1926 along with Howard W. Gilmore, Carlton Hutchins, Max Leslie, and C. Wade McClusky.

=== Early Marine Corps career ===
Henderson departed the United States on November 3, 1927 from San Francisco, California and arrived at Chingwangtao, China on December 16, 1927. He was assigned as a platoon commander with the 15th Machine Gun and Howitzer Company, 12th Regiment, 3rd Brigade at Tientsin. After passing a flight physical while in China, he received orders to report to Observation Squadron 8 (VO-8M) in San Diego, California. He departed China on July 28, 1928 onboard the USS Chaumont (AP-5) arriving in San Francisco on August 17, 1928.

He also served in various Caribbean stations, and on the aircraft carriers Langley (CV-1), Ranger (CV-4), and Saratoga (CV-3).

=== World War II ===
On June 4, 1942, as Japanese forces approached Midway Island in the Pacific Ocean, Major Henderson, the commanding officer of VMSB-241, led 16 Marine Corps aircraft in the attack. Henderson split his squadron into two flights, one with SBD Dauntless and one with SB2U Vindicator dive bombers in a glide bombing attack on the aircraft carrier Hiryū. His left wing burst into flames as he began his final approach. Henderson continued the attack and perished as his plane dived toward the enemy carrier. He was posthumously awarded the Navy Cross.

=== Personal life ===
In 1932, while at Pensacola, Henderson met Jule Adeline Galey, and they married in 1933. Following Henderson's death, Galey remarried and had a daughter. Following her death in 1999, she was cremated and her ashes were scattered over the Pacific, just north of Midway Island.

== Honors ==
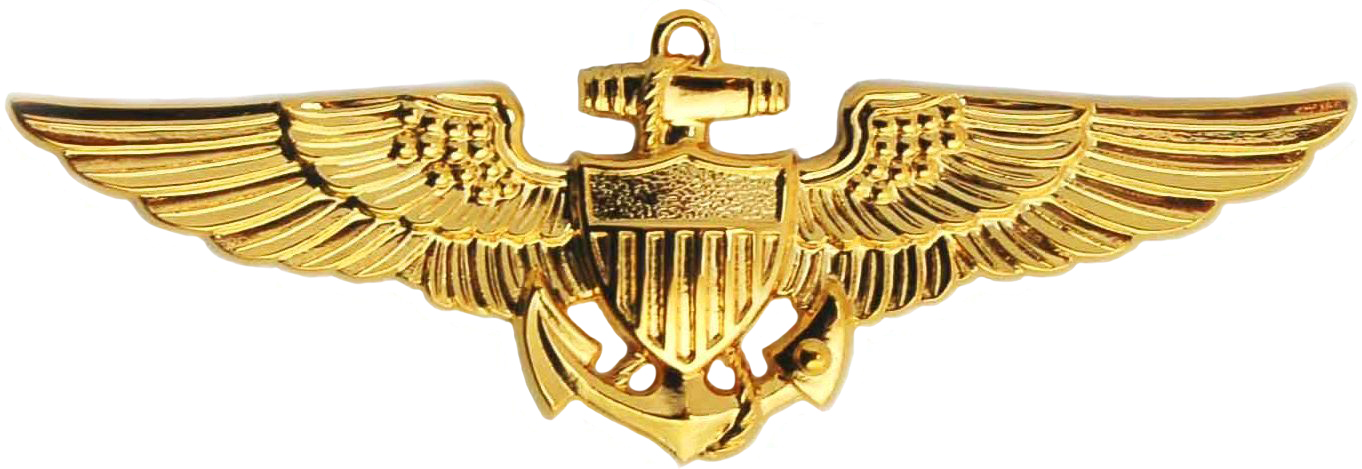

Naval Aviator Badge
Navy Cross (posthumously)
Purple Heart (posthumously)	Marine Corps Expeditionary Medal	Second Nicaraguan Campaign Medal
Yangtze Service Medal	China Service Medal	American Defense Service Medal w/ Fleet Clasp (3/16" Bronze Star)
American Campaign Medal (posthumously)	Asiatic–Pacific Campaign Medal w/ 3/16" bronze star	World War II Victory Medal (posthumously)

=== Navy Cross citation ===
HENDERSON, LOFTON R.
Major, U.S. Marine Corps
Marine Scout-Bombing Squadron 241 (VMSB-241), Marine Aircraft Group 22 (MAG-22), Naval Air Station, Midway
Date of Action: June 4, 1942
Citation:
The Navy Cross is presented to Lofton R. Henderson, Major, U.S. Marine Corps, for extraordinary heroism as Squadron Commander of Marine Scout-Bombing Squadron TWO HUNDRED FORTY-ONE (VMSB- 241), during action against enemy Japanese forces in the Battle of Midway on June 4, 1942. With utter disregard for his own personal safety, Major Henderson, with keen judgment and courageous aggressiveness in the face of strong enemy fighter opposition, led his squadron in an attack which contributed materially to the defeat of the enemy. He was subsequently reported as missing in action. It is believed he gallantly gave up his life in the service of his country.

== Legacy ==
In August 1942, the partially constructed Japanese airfield on Guadalcanal was captured at the outset of a six-month campaign to expel the enemy from both Guadalcanal and nearby and smaller Tulagi. It was named Henderson Field (now Honiara International Airport) in his honor.

Another Henderson Field (IATA: MDY, ICAO: PMDY) is today a public airport on Sand Island in Midway Atoll, an unincorporated territory of the United States. The airport is used as an emergency diversion point for ETOPS operations. The airfield provides access to Midway Atoll National Wildlife Refuge. It operated until 1993 as Naval Air Facility Midway. The original Henderson Field was on Eastern Island (Midway Atoll).

In 1945, the Gearing-class destroyer USS Henderson (DD-785) was named after him.

The 21st Street Bridge in his hometown of Lorain, Ohio, was renamed the Lofton Henderson Memorial Bridge.

== Bibliography ==
- Hubler, Richard G.; DeChant, John A (1944). Flying Leathernecks – The Complete Record of Marine Corps Aviation in Action 1941 – 1944. Garden City, New York: Doubleday, Doran & Co., Inc.
