= 1942 in the United States =

- Decades: 1920s; 1930s; 1940s; 1950s; 1960s
- See also: History of the United States (1918–1945); Timeline of United States history (1930–1949); List of years in the United States

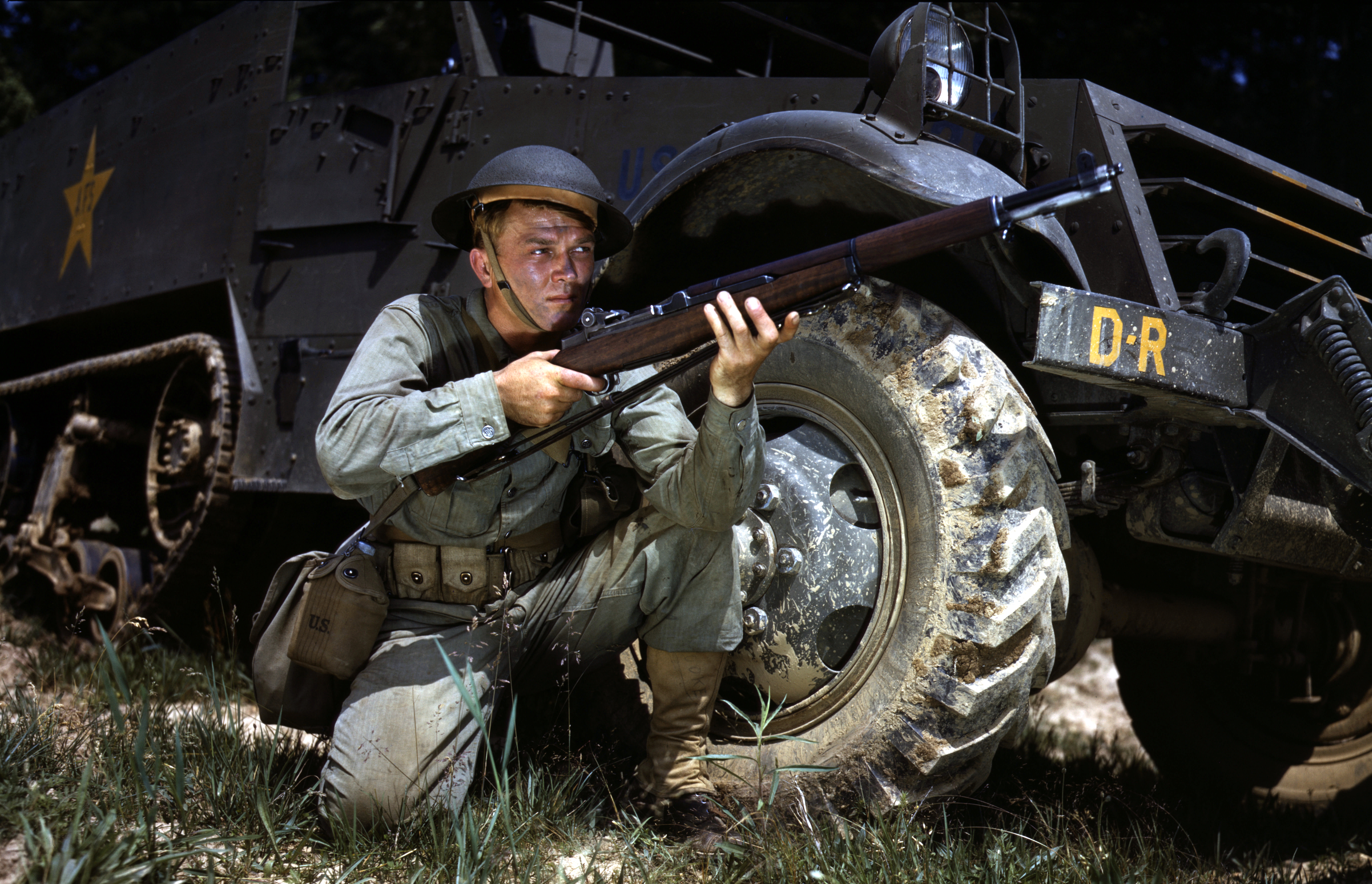
Infantryman wearing a Brodie helmet, kneeling in front of M3 Half-track. Holds an M1 Garand rifle. Fort Knox, June 1942.

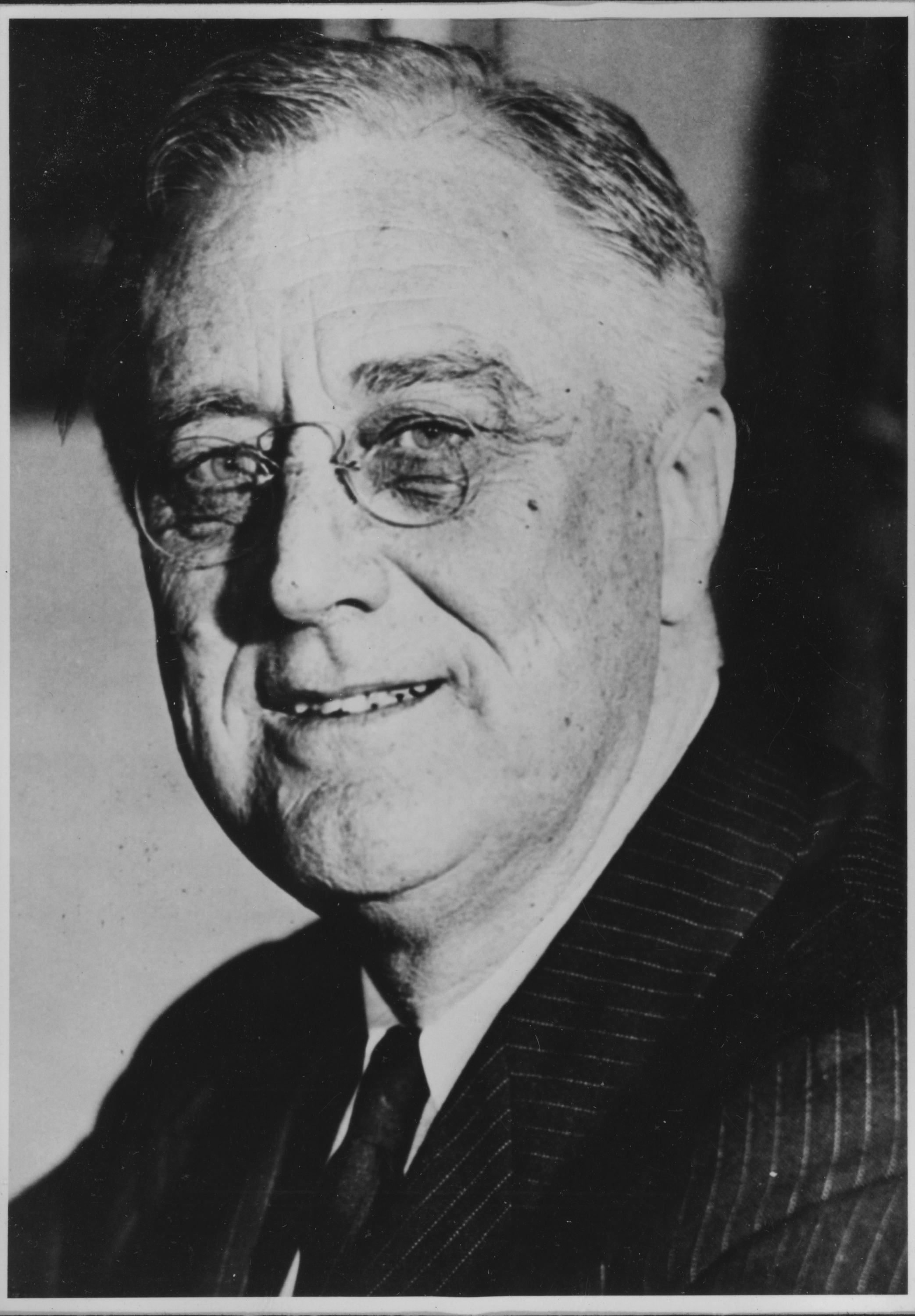
President Franklin D. Roosevelt, 1942

Events from the year 1942 in the United States.

== Incumbents ==
=== Federal government ===
- President: Franklin D. Roosevelt (D-New York)
- Vice President: Henry A. Wallace (D-Iowa)
- Chief Justice: Harlan F. Stone (New York)
- Speaker of the House of Representatives: Sam Rayburn (D-Texas)
- Senate Majority Leader: Alben W. Barkley (D-Kentucky)
- Congress: 77th

==== State governments ====
Governors and lieutenant governors

=== Governors ===
- Governor of Alabama: Frank M. Dixon (Democratic)
- Governor of Arizona: Sidney Preston Osborn (Democratic)
- Governor of Arkansas: Homer Martin Adkins (Democratic)
- Governor of California: Culbert Olson (Democratic)
- Governor of Colorado: Ralph Lawrence Carr (Republican)
- Governor of Connecticut: Robert A. Hurley (Democratic)
- Governor of Delaware: Walter W. Bacon (Republican)
- Governor of Florida: Spessard Holland (Democratic)
- Governor of Georgia: Eugene Talmadge (Democratic)
- Governor of Idaho: Chase A. Clark (Democratic)
- Governor of Illinois: Dwight H. Green (Republican)
- Governor of Indiana: Henry F. Schricker (Democratic)
- Governor of Iowa: George A. Wilson (Republican)
- Governor of Kansas: Payne Ratner (Republican)
- Governor of Kentucky: Keen Johnson (Democratic)
- Governor of Louisiana: Sam H. Jones (Democratic)
- Governor of Maine: Sumner Sewall (Republican)
- Governor of Maryland: Herbert R. O'Conor (Democratic)
- Governor of Massachusetts: Leverett Saltonstall (Republican)
- Governor of Michigan: Murray Van Wagoner (Democratic)
- Governor of Minnesota: Harold Stassen (Republican)
- Governor of Mississippi: Paul B. Johnson, Sr. (Democratic)
- Governor of Missouri: Forrest C. Donnell (Republican)
- Governor of Montana: Sam C. Ford (Republican)
- Governor of Nebraska: Dwight Griswold (Republican)
- Governor of Nevada: Edward P. Carville (Democratic)
- Governor of New Hampshire: Robert O. Blood (Republican)
- Governor of New Jersey: Charles Edison (Democratic)
- Governor of New Mexico: John E. Miles (Democratic)
- Governor of New York:
  - until December 3: Herbert H. Lehman (Democratic)
  - December 3 – end of December 31: Charles Poletti (Democratic)
- Governor of North Carolina: J. Melville Broughton (Democratic)
- Governor of North Dakota: John Moses (Democratic)
- Governor of Ohio: John W. Bricker (Republican)
- Governor of Oklahoma: Leon C. Phillips (Democratic)
- Governor of Oregon: Charles A. Sprague (Republican)
- Governor of Pennsylvania: Arthur James (Republican)
- Governor of Rhode Island: J. Howard McGrath (Democratic)
- Governor of South Carolina:
  - until February 27: Joseph Emile Harley (Democratic)
  - February 27-March 2: vacant
  - starting March 2: Richard Manning Jefferies (Democratic)
- Governor of South Dakota: Harlan J. Bushfield (Republican)
- Governor of Tennessee: Prentice Cooper (Democratic)
- Governor of Texas: Coke R. Stevenson (Democratic)
- Governor of Utah: Herbert B. Maw (Democratic)
- Governor of Vermont: William H. Wills (Republican)
- Governor of Virginia: James H. Price (Democratic) (until January 21), Colgate Darden (Democratic) (starting January 21)
- Governor of Washington: Arthur B. Langlie (Republican)
- Governor of West Virginia: Matthew M. Neely (Democratic)
- Governor of Wisconsin: Julius P. Heil (Republican)
- Governor of Wyoming: Nels H. Smith (Republican)

=== Lieutenant governors ===
- Lieutenant Governor of Alabama: Albert A. Carmichael (Democratic)
- Lieutenant Governor of Arkansas: Robert L. Bailey (Democratic)
- Lieutenant Governor of California: Ellis E. Patterson (Democratic)
- Lieutenant Governor of Colorado: John Charles Vivian (Republican)
- Lieutenant Governor of Connecticut: Odell Shepard (Democratic)
- Lieutenant Governor of Delaware: Isaac J. MacCollum (Democratic)
- Lieutenant Governor of Idaho: Charles C. Gossett (Democratic)
- Lieutenant Governor of Illinois: Hugh W. Cross (Republican)
- Lieutenant Governor of Indiana: Charles M. Dawson (Democratic)
- Lieutenant Governor of Iowa: Bourke B. Hickenlooper (Republican)
- Lieutenant Governor of Kansas: Carl E. Friend (Republican)
- Lieutenant Governor of Kentucky: Rodes K. Myers (Democratic)
- Lieutenant Governor of Louisiana: Marc M. Mouton (Democratic)
- Lieutenant Governor of Massachusetts: Horace T. Cahill (Republican)
- Lieutenant Governor of Michigan: Frank Murphy (Democratic)
- Lieutenant Governor of Minnesota: C. Elmer Anderson (Republican)
- Lieutenant Governor of Mississippi: Dennis Murphree (Democratic)
- Lieutenant Governor of Missouri: Frank Gaines Harris (Democratic)
- Lieutenant Governor of Montana: Ernest T. Eaton (Republican)
- Lieutenant Governor of Nebraska: William E. Johnson (Republican)
- Lieutenant Governor of Nevada: Maurice J. Sullivan (Democratic)
- Lieutenant Governor of New Mexico: Ceferino Quintana (Democratic)
- Lieutenant Governor of New York:
  - until December 3: Charles Poletti (Democratic)
  - December 3 – end of December 31: vacant
- Lieutenant Governor of North Carolina: Reginald L. Harris (Democratic)
- Lieutenant Governor of North Dakota: Oscar W. Hagen (Republican)
- Lieutenant Governor of Ohio: Paul M. Herbert (Republican)
- Lieutenant Governor of Oklahoma: James E. Berry (Democratic)
- Lieutenant Governor of Pennsylvania: Samuel S. Lewis (Democratic)
- Lieutenant Governor of Rhode Island: Louis W. Cappelli (Democratic)
- Lieutenant Governor of South Carolina: vacant
- Lieutenant Governor of South Dakota: A. C. Miller (Republican)
- Lieutenant Governor of Tennessee: Blan R. Maxwell (Democratic)
- Lieutenant Governor of Texas: vacant
- Lieutenant Governor of Vermont: Mortimer R. Proctor (Republican)
- Lieutenant Governor of Virginia: vacant (until January 21), William M. Tuck (Democratic) (starting January 21)
- Lieutenant Governor of Washington: Victor A. Meyers (Democratic)
- Lieutenant Governor of Wisconsin: Walter S. Goodland (Republican)

== Events ==
=== January ===
- January 1
  - Sales of new cars are banned to save steel.
  - WWII: The United States and Philippines troops fight the Battle of Bataan.
- January 10 – WWII: The last German air-raid on the English port of Liverpool destroys the home of William Patrick Hitler, Adolf Hitler's nephew. William Hitler is in the United States and later joins the navy to fight against his uncle.
- January 14–15 – WWII: Operation Drumbeat – German submarine U-123 under the command of Reinhard Hardegen sinks a Norwegian tanker within sight of Long Island before entering New York Harbor and sinking a British tanker off Sandy Hook as she leaves heading south along the East Coast.
- January 16 – Film actress Carole Lombard and her mother are among all 22 aboard TWA Flight 3 & are killed when the Douglas DC-3 plane crashes into Potosi Mountain near Las Vegas in Nevada while she is returning from a tour to promote the sale of war bonds.
- January 19
  - WWII: Japanese forces invade Burma.
  - The United States VIII Bomber Command, later to become the Eighth Air Force, is established in Savannah, Georgia.
- January 25 – WWII: Thailand declares war on the United States and United Kingdom.
- January 26 – WWII: The first American forces arrive in Europe, landing in Northern Ireland.

=== February ===
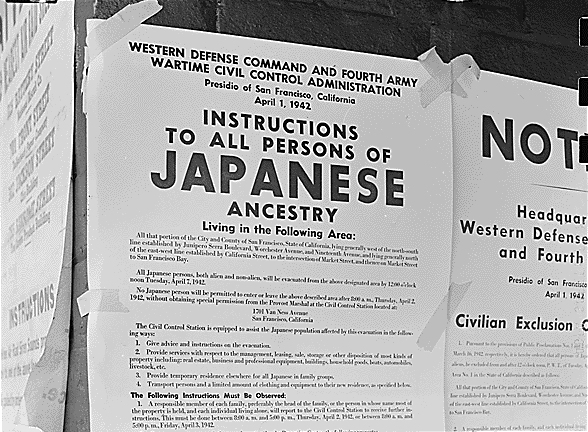
February 2: An executive order directs Japanese American internment

- February 2 – WWII: President Franklin D. Roosevelt signs an executive order directing the internment of Italian, German, and Japanese Americans and orders the seizure of their properties.
- February 7 – President Roosevelt signs an Executive Order creating the War Shipping Administration (WSA).
- February 8
  - WWII: Top United States military leaders hold their first formal meeting to discuss American military strategy in the war.
  - Daylight saving time goes into effect in the United States.
- February 9 – WWII: The ocean liner SS Normandie catches fire while being converted into the troopship USS Lafayette at pier 88 in New York City. In the early hours of February 10 she capsizes.
- February 18 – WWII: More than 200 American sailors die in Newfoundland when the USS Truxtun runs aground near Chambers Cove and the USS Pollux runs aground at Lawn Point.
- February 19 – President Franklin D. Roosevelt signs executive order 9066 allowing the United States military to define areas as exclusionary zones. These zones affect the Japanese on the West Coast, and Germans and Italians primarily on the East Coast.
- February 20 – Lieutenant Edward O'Hare becomes America's first World War II flying ace.
- February 22 – WWII: President Roosevelt orders General Douglas MacArthur out of the Philippines as American defense of the nation collapses.
- February 23 – WWII: The Japanese submarine I-17 fires 17 high-explosive shells toward an oil refinery near Santa Barbara, California, causing little damage.
- February 24 – The Voice of America begins broadcasting.
- February 25 – Battle of Los Angeles: Over 1,400 AA shells are fired at an unidentified, slow-moving object in the skies over Los Angeles. The appearance of the object triggers an immediate wartime blackout over most of Southern California, with thousands of air raid wardens being deployed throughout the city. In total there are 6 deaths. Despite the several hour barrage no planes are downed.
- February 26 – The 14th Academy Awards ceremony, hosted by Bob Hope is held at Biltmore Hotel in Los Angeles, with John Ford's How Green Was My Valley winning Outstanding Motion Picture along with four other awards, including a third Best Director win for Ford. The two aforementioned awards are currently considered controversial due to the retroactive high regard placed on Orson Welles' also-nominated Citizen Kane.

=== March ===
- March – Construction begins on the Badger Army Ammunition Plant (the largest in the United States during WWII).
- March 9 – WWII: Executive order 9082 (February 28, 1942) reorganizes the United States Army into three major commands: Army Ground Forces, Army Air Forces, and Services of Supply, later redesignated Army Service Forces.
- March 27 – Capitol Records, the first record label on the United States' West Coast of note, is founded by Jonny Mercer, Buddy DeSylvia, and Glenn E. Wallichis.

=== April ===
- April 3 – WWII: Japanese forces begin an all-out assault on the United States and Filipino troops on the Bataan Peninsula.

=== May ===
- May 6 – WWII: On Corregidor, the last American and Filipino forces in the Philippines surrender to the Japanese.
- May 14 – Aaron Copland's Lincoln Portrait is performed for the first time by the Cincinnati Symphony Orchestra.
- May 15 – WWII: In the United States, a bill creating the Women's Auxiliary Army Corps (WAAC) is signed into law.
- May 20 – The first African-American seamen are taken into the United States Navy.

=== June ===
- June 4–7 – WWII: Battle of Midway – The United States Navy defeats an Imperial Japanese Navy attack against Midway Atoll.
- June 7 – WWII: Aleutian Islands Campaign – Japanese forces invade the Aleutian Islands of Alaska.
- June 13
  - The United States opens its Office of War Information, a propaganda center.
  - Office of Strategic Services (OSS) is created.
- June 21 – WWII: Bombardment of Fort Stevens – Fort Stevens, Oregon is fired upon by a Japanese submarine.

=== July ===
- July 4 – WWII in the European Theater of Operations: US Eighth Air Force flies its first inauspicious mission in Europe using borrowed British planes; six aircraft went out, only three came back.
- July 19 – WWII – Battle of the Atlantic: German Grand Admiral Karl Dönitz orders the last U-boats to withdraw from their United States Atlantic coast positions, in response to an effective American convoy system.
- July 30 – WWII: A bill creating the United States Marine Corps Women's Reserve is signed into law.

=== August ===
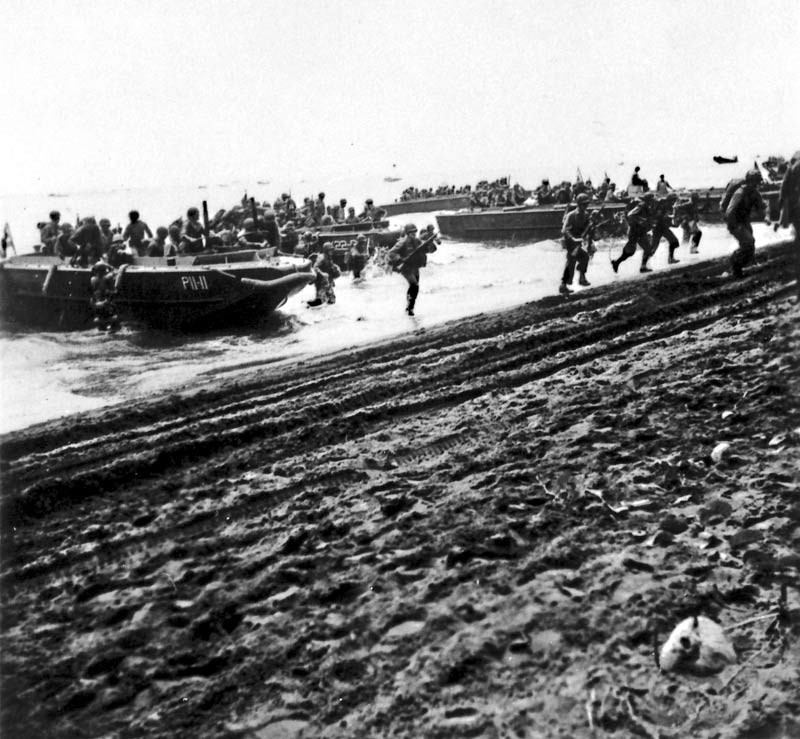
August 7: Battle of Guadalcanal begins

- August 7 – WWII: Battle of Guadalcanal begins – The United States Marine Corps initiates the first American offensive of the war with a landing on Guadalcanal in the Solomon Islands.
- August 8 – WWII: In Washington, D.C., six German would-be saboteurs are executed (two others are cooperative and receive life imprisonment instead).
- August 13 – Walt Disney's fifth feature film, Bambi, is released. Although the initial box office gross is lackluster (due to the loss of most of the European film market during World War II), it eventually becomes a financial success through various reissues over the next several decades. Due to continued financial losses, Disney spends the majority of the rest of the 1940s producing a string of package films, with Bambi being the last singular project he will release until Cinderella eight years later.
- August 15 – WWII: The American tanker SS Ohio reaches Malta as part of the convoy of Operation Pedestal.
- August 16 – The U.S. Navy blimp L-8 (Flight 101) comes ashore near San Francisco, eventually coming down in Daly City (the crew is missing).

=== September ===
- September 9 – WWII: A Japanese floatplane drops incendiary devices at Mount Emily, near Brookings, Oregon, in the first of two "Lookout Air Raids", the first bombing of the continental United States.
- September 15 – The Women's Flying Training Detachment (WFTD) is established.
- September 21 – Boeing B-29 Superfortress bomber prototype first flies, from Boeing Field, Seattle.
- September 27 – WWII: Both the commerce raiding German auxiliary cruiser Stier and American Liberty ship SS Stephen Hopkins sink following a gun battle in the South Atlantic. Hilfskreuzer Stier is the only commerce raider to be sunk by a defensively equipped merchant ship.

=== October ===
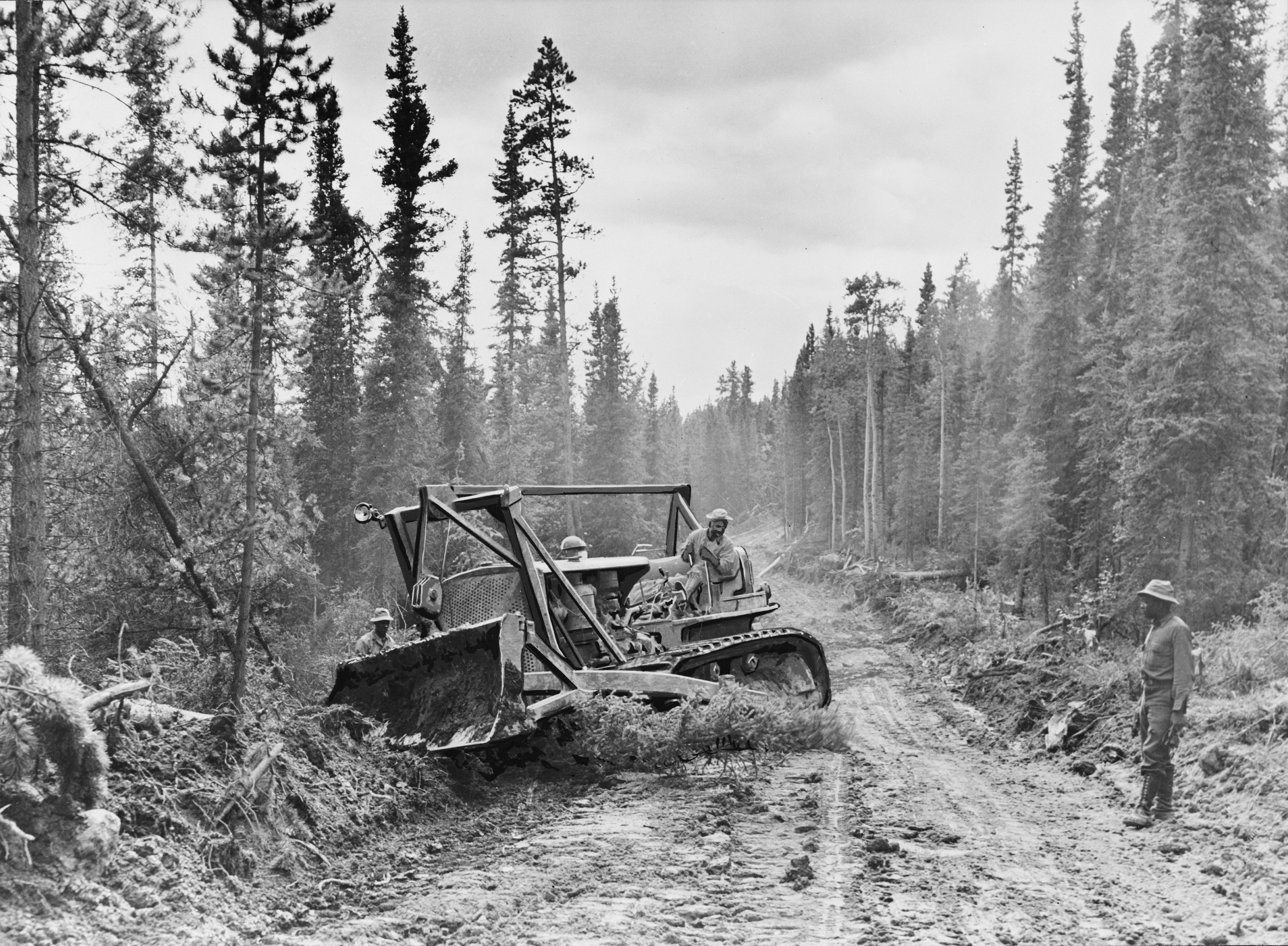
October 28: The Alaska Highway is completed.

- October 5 – The St. Louis Cardinals defeat the New York Yankees, 4 games to 1, to win their 4th World Series Title.
- October 11 – WWII – Battle of Cape Esperance: On the northwest coast of Guadalcanal, United States Navy ships intercept and defeat a Japanese fleet on their way to reinforce troops on the island.
- October 23 – Award-winning composer and Hollywood songwriter Ralph Rainger ("Thanks for the Memory") is among 12 people killed in the mid-air collision between an American Airlines DC-3 airliner and a U.S. Army bomber near Palm Springs, California.
- October 26 – WWII – Battle of the Santa Cruz Islands: Two Japanese aircraft carriers are heavily damaged and one U.S. carrier is sunk.
- October 28 – The Alaska Highway is completed.

=== November ===
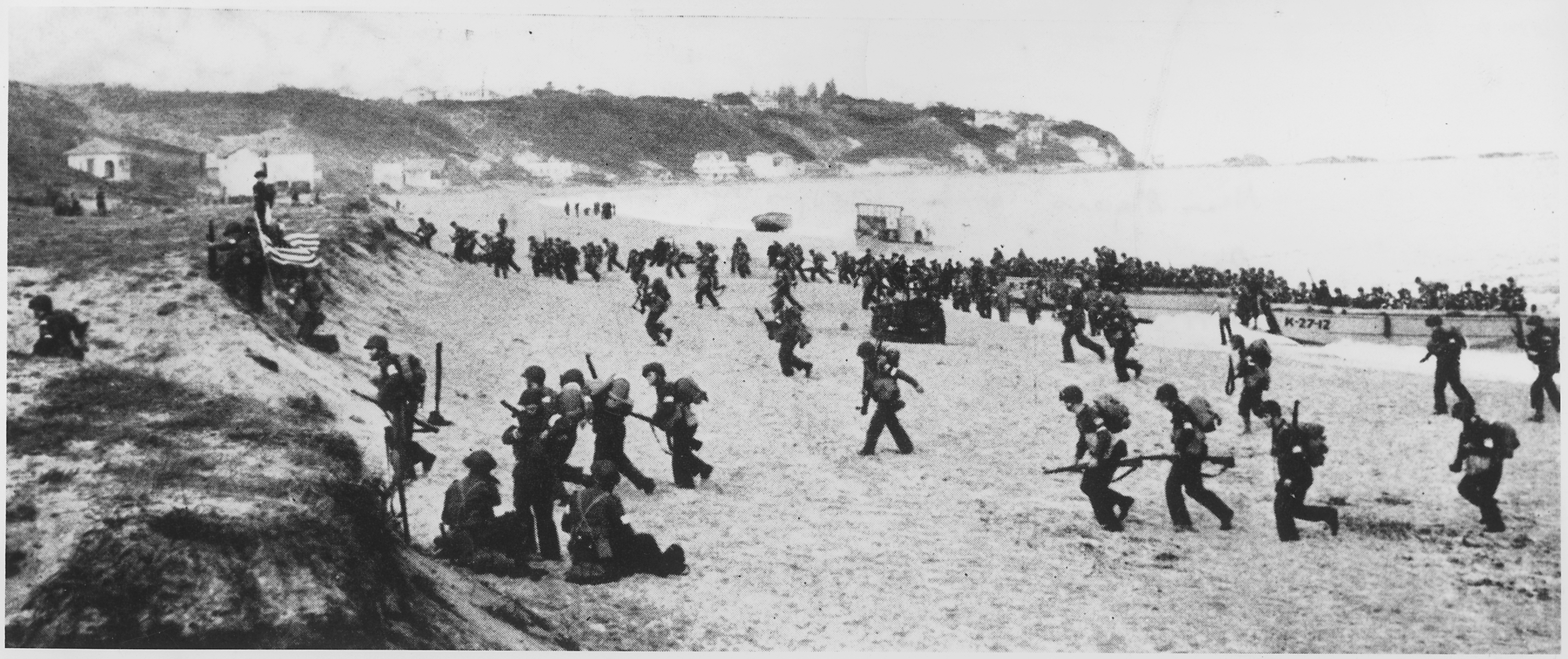
American Troops near Algiers during Operation Torch

- November 8 – Operation Torch – United States and United Kingdom forces land in French North Africa.
- November 9 – WWII: U.S. serviceman Edward Leonski is hanged at Melbourne's Pentridge Prison for the "Brown-Out" murders of three women in May.
- November 12 – WWII – Battle of Guadalcanal: A naval battle near Guadalcanal starts between Japanese and American forces.
- November 13 – Battle of Guadalcanal: Aviators from the USS Enterprise sink the Japanese battleship Hiei.
- November 15 – The Battle of Guadalcanal ends: Although the United States Navy suffers heavy losses, it retains control of Guadalcanal.
- November 21 – The completion of the Alaska Highway (also known as the Alcan Highway) is celebrated (however, the "highway" is not usable by general vehicles until 1943).
- November 23 – A bill creating the United States Coast Guard Women's Reserve (SPARS) is signed into law.
- November 26 – The movie Casablanca premieres at the Hollywood Theater in New York City.
- November 28 – In Boston, Massachusetts, a fire in the Cocoanut Grove night club kills 491 people.
- November 29 – Coffee rationing begins in the United States.

=== December ===
- December 1 – Gasoline rationing begins in the United States.
- December 2 – Manhattan Project: Below the bleachers of Stagg Field at the University of Chicago, a team led by Enrico Fermi initiates the first self-sustaining nuclear chain reaction (a coded message, "The Italian navigator has landed in the new world" is then sent to U.S. President Franklin D. Roosevelt).
- December 22 – In Aliquippa, Pennsylvania, an avalanche kills 26, including Vulcan Crucible Steel Co heir-apparent Samuel A. Stafford Sr., when two 100 ton boulders fall on a bus filled with wartime steel workers on their way home.

=== Ongoing ===
- World War II, U.S. involvement (1941–1945)

=== Unknown ===
- The Bernard Family Hall of North American Mammals opens in the American Museum of Natural History, with 10 dioramas

== Births ==
=== January ===
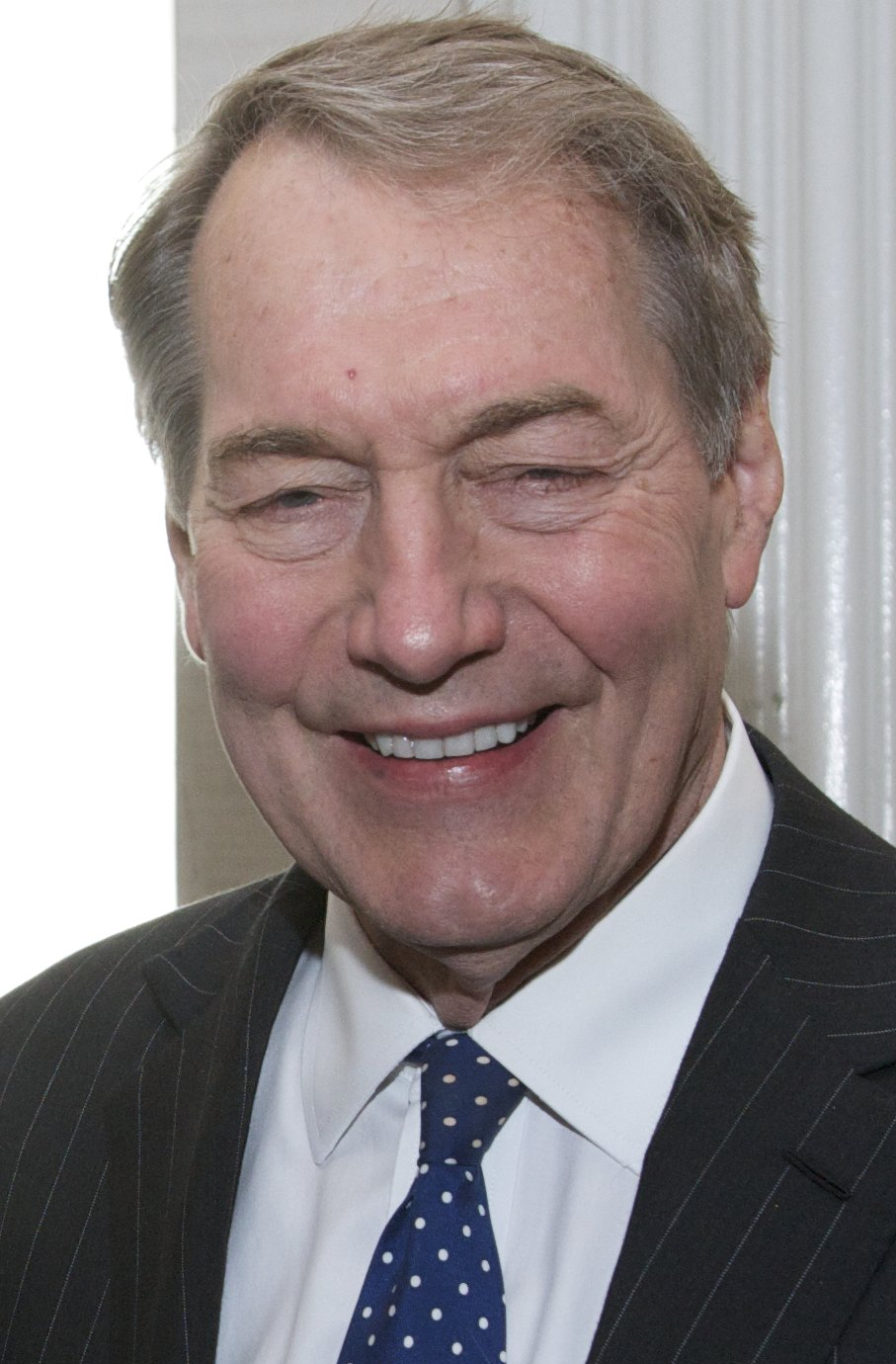
Charlie Rose

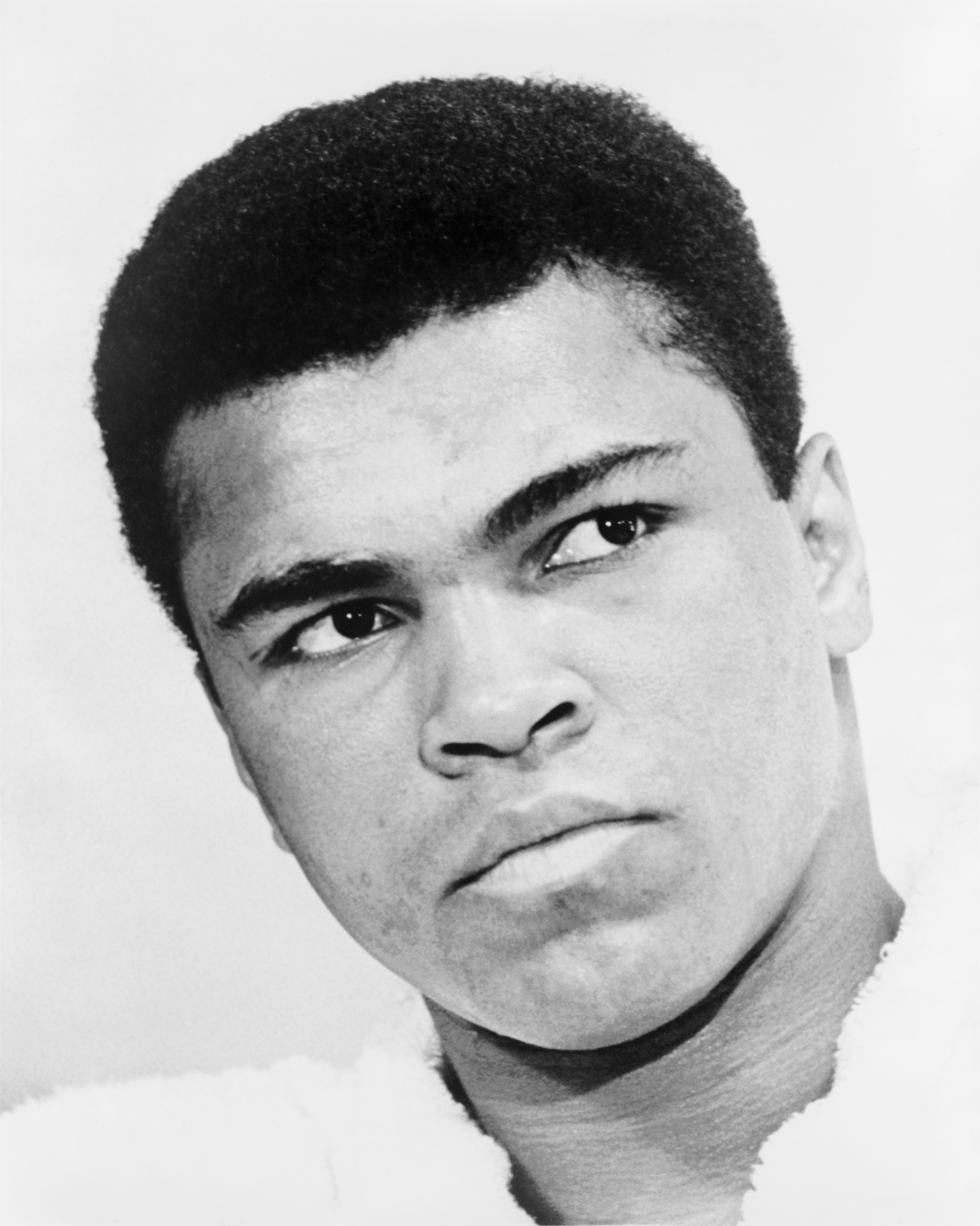
Muhammad Ali

- January 1
  - Billy Lothridge, American football player (d. 1996)
  - Country Joe McDonald, American musician (The "Fish" Cheer/I-Feel-Like-I'm-Fixin'-to-Die Rag) (d. 2026)
- January 2
  - Dennis Hastert, American politician (d. 2026)
  - Hugh Shelton, American military leader, Chairman of the Joint Chiefs of Staff
- January 3 – Donna Axum, American beauty pageant winner and model (d. 2018)
- January 4 – Jim Downing, American race car driver and inventor
- January 5 – Charlie Rose, American television anchor and talk show host
- January 7
  - Jim Lefebvre, American baseball player and manager
  - Danny Steinmann, director and screenwriter (d. 2012)
- January 9
  - John Dunning, author (d. 2023)
  - Judy Malloy, poet and author
- January 11
  - Clarence Clemons, African-American saxophonist (d. 2011)
  - Leo Cullum, soldier, pilot, and cartoonist (d. 2010)
  - George Mira, American football player (d. 2025)
- January 17 – Muhammad Ali, born Cassius Clay, African-American boxer, activist, and philanthropist (d. 2016)
- January 18 – Ruby Winters, American singer (d. 2016)
- January 20 – Linda Moulton Howe, American journalist and producer
- January 24
  - Melvin Fitting, American logician
  - Gary Hart, American wrestler and manager (d. 2008)
- January 25 – Carl Eller, American football player
- January 27
  - John Witherspoon, American actor and comedian (d. 2019)
  - Steve Wynn, American businessman and art collector
- January 30 – Marty Balin, American singer, songwriter, and musician (d. 2018)

=== February ===
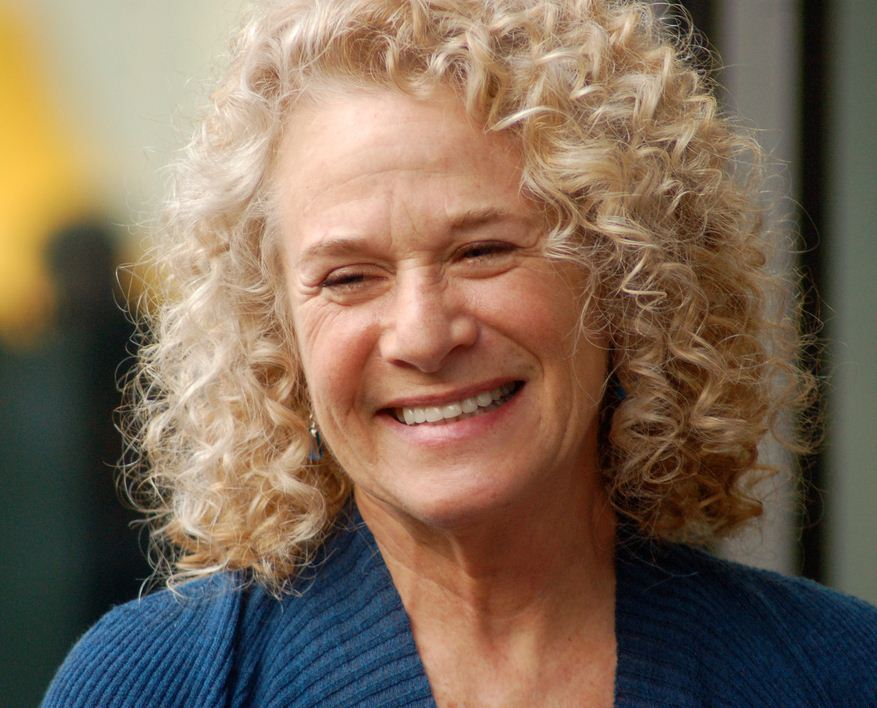
Carole King

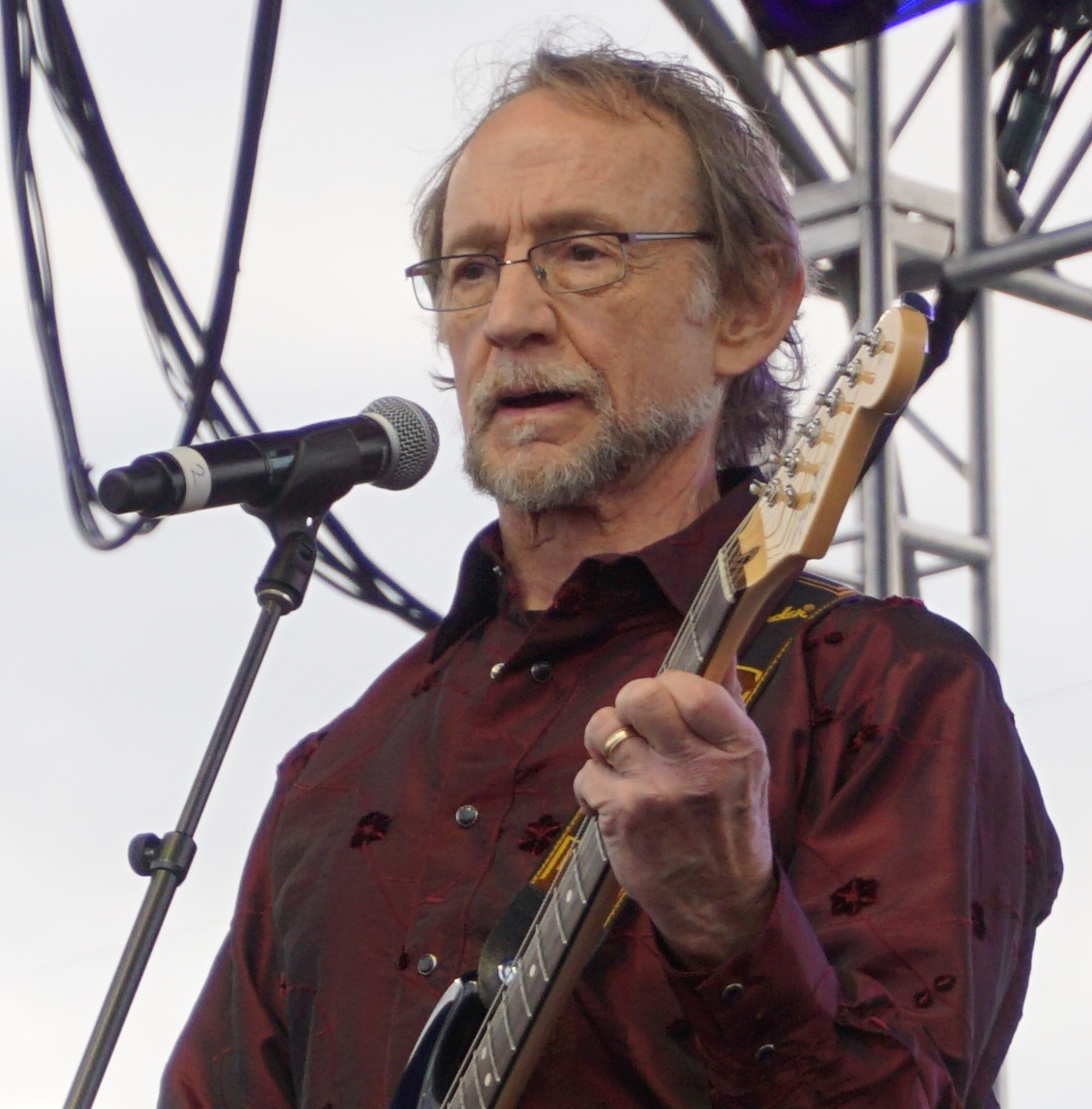
Peter Tork

- February 2 – Ed Bogas, American musician and composer
- February 5 – Roger Staubach, American football player
- February 8
  - Fritz Peterson, American baseball player (d. 2024)
  - Costen Shockley, American baseball player (d. 2022)
- February 9 – Carole King, American singer and composer
- February 10
  - Howard Mudd, American offensive lineman & offensive line coach (d. 2020)
  - Lawrence Weiner, American conceptual artist (d. 2021)
- February 11
  - Otis Clay, African-American R&B and soul singer (d. 2016)
  - Leon Haywood, American funk and soul singer, songwriter and record producer (d. 2016)
- February 12 – Larry L. Taylor, American Medal of Honor recipient (d. 2024)
- February 13
  - Carol Lynley, American actress (d. 2019)
  - Peter Tork, American musician and actor (d. 2019)
  - Donald E. Williams, American astronaut (d. 2016)
- February 14 – Michael Bloomberg, American businessman
- February 15 – Sherry Jackson, American actress
- February 19 – Paul Krause, American football player
- February 20 – Mitch McConnell, American politician, United States Senator (R-KY)
- February 24 – Joe Lieberman, American politician, Senator for Connecticut (1989–2013) (d. 2024)
- February 25 – Karen Grassle, American actress
- February 27 – Robert H. Grubbs, American chemist, Nobel Prize laureate (d. 2021)

=== March ===
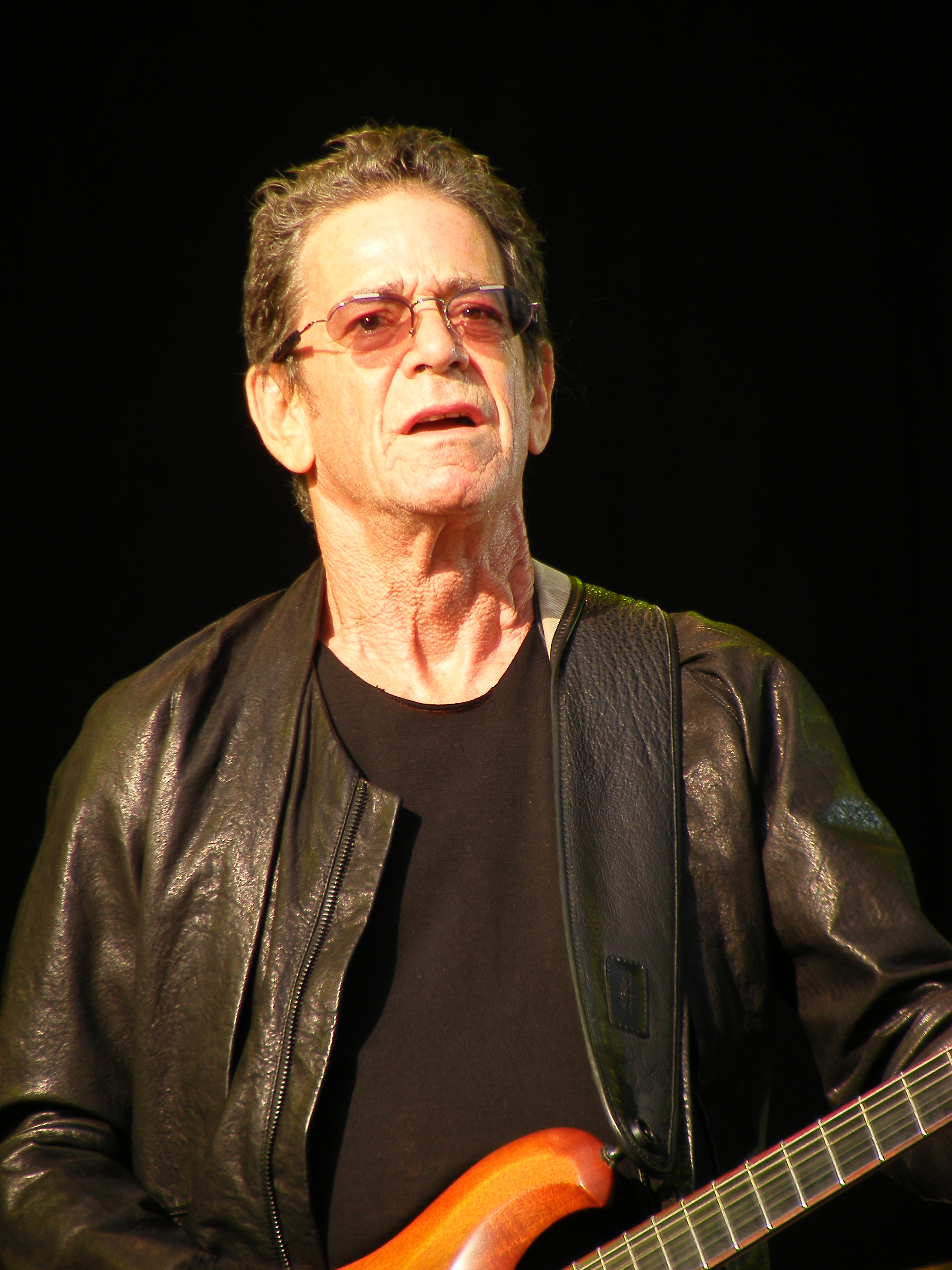
Lou Reed

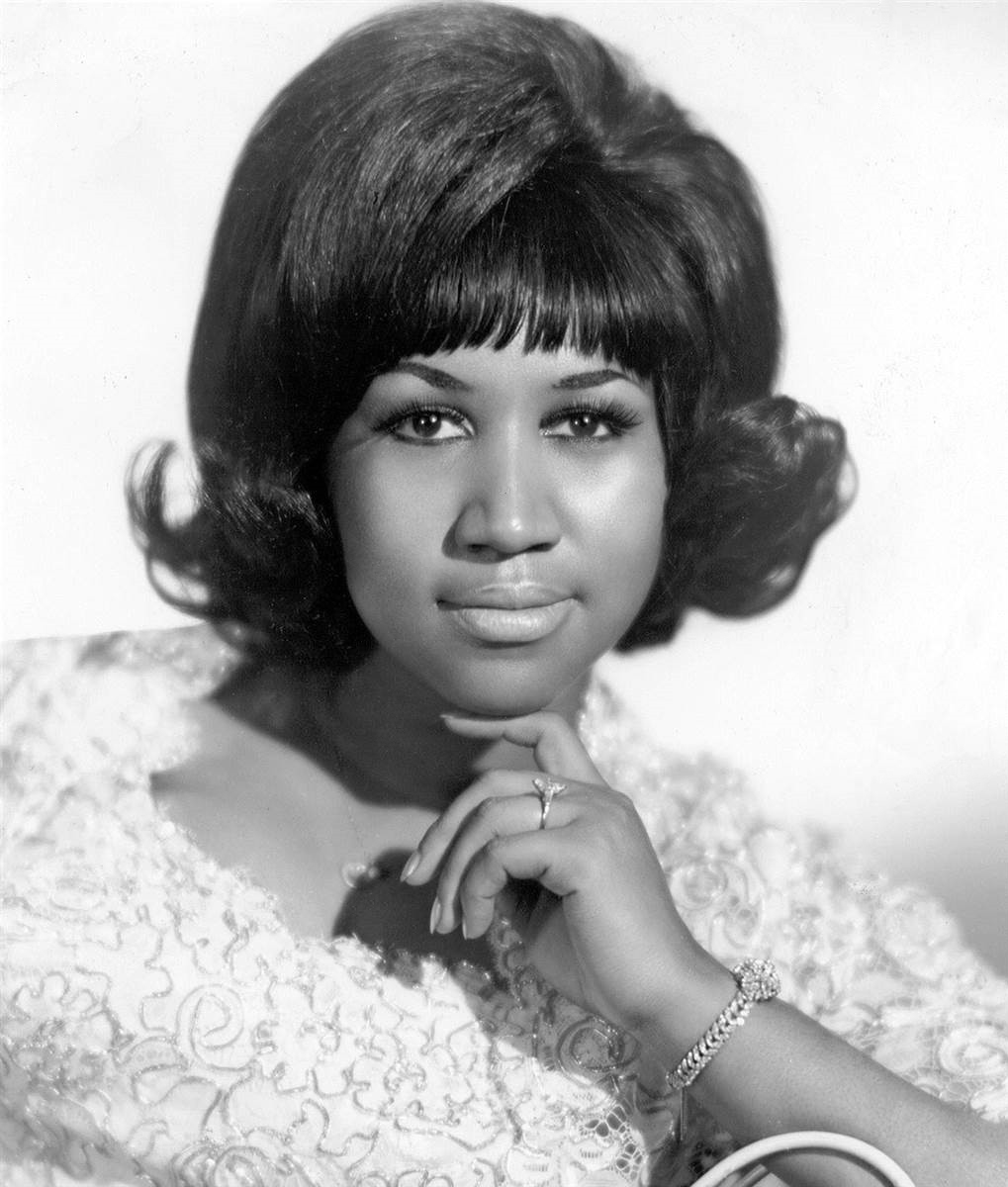
Aretha Franklin

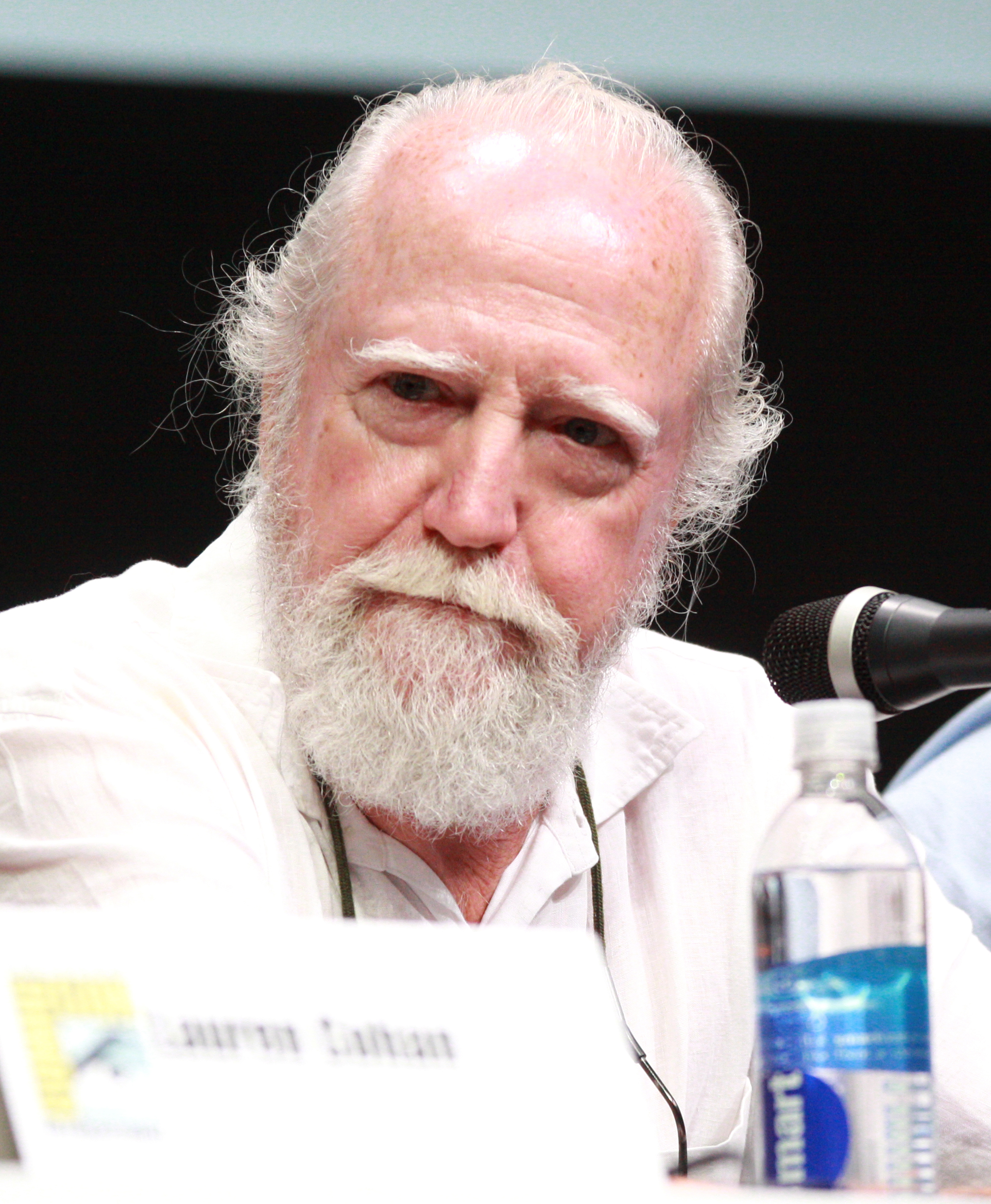
Scott Wilson

- March 1 – Lou Gerstner, American businessman (d. 2025)
- March 2
  - John Irving, American author
  - Lou Reed, American singer-songwriter and guitarist (d. 2013)
- March 5 – Mike Resnick, American science fiction author (d. 2020)
- March 7
  - Michael Eisner, American film studio executive
  - Tammy Faye Messner, American evangelist, singer and television personality (d. 2007)
- March 8 – Dick Allen, American baseball player (d. 2020)
- March 9 – Larry Walker, American politician (d. 2026)
- March 10 – Bob Berry, American football player (d. 2023)
- March 12 – Jimmy Wynn, American baseball player (d. 2020)
- March 13
  - Dave Cutler, American software engineer
  - Scatman John, American singer and songwriter (d. 1999)
- March 15 – The Iron Sheik, Iranian-American wrestler (d. 2023)
- March 17 – John Wayne Gacy, American serial killer (d. 1994)
- March 20
  - Earl Bramblett, American mass murderer (d. 2003)
  - Billy Engelhart, American racing driver
  - Peter Schjeldahl, American art critic and poet (d. 2022)
  - Benno C. Schmidt Jr., American academic, president of Yale University (d. 2023)
- March 21
  - Willie Brown, American football player and coach (d. 2018)
  - ABilly S. Jones-Hennin, American LGBT rights activist (d. 2024)
- March 22 – Patricia A. Goldman, American women's rights activist (d. 2023)
- March 25
  - Aretha Franklin, African-American singer, songwriter, actress, and civil rights activist (d. 2018)
  - Joseph McNeil, American air force officer (d. 2025)
- March 26
  - Ronald Bass, American screenwriter and film producer
  - Erica Jong, American author
- March 28
  - Daniel Dennett, American philosopher (d. 2024)
  - Jerry Sloan, American basketball coach (d. 2020)
- March 29
  - Larry Pressler, U.S. Senator from South Dakota from 1979 to 1997
  - Scott Wilson, American actor (d. 2018)

=== April ===
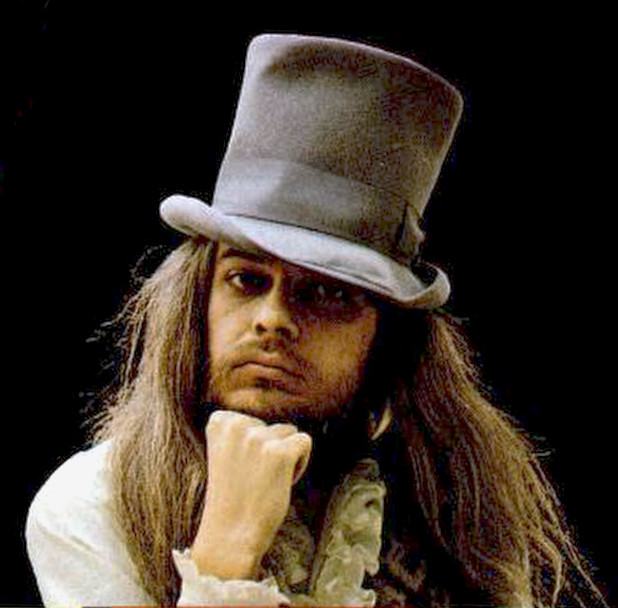
Leon Russell

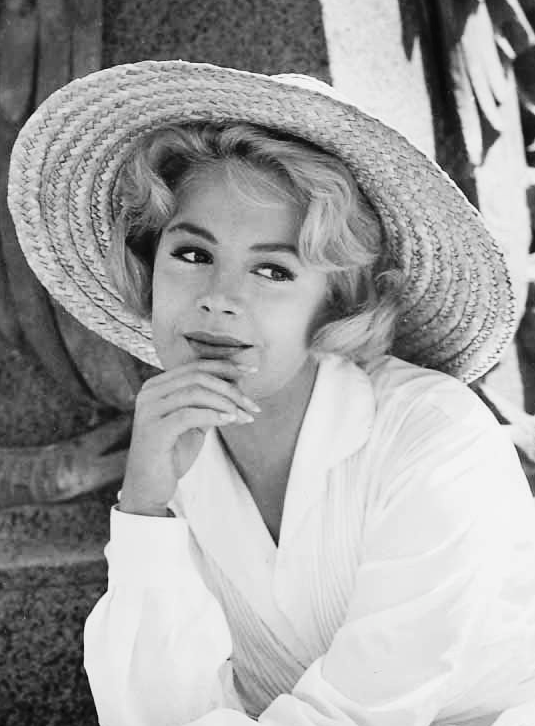
Sandra Dee

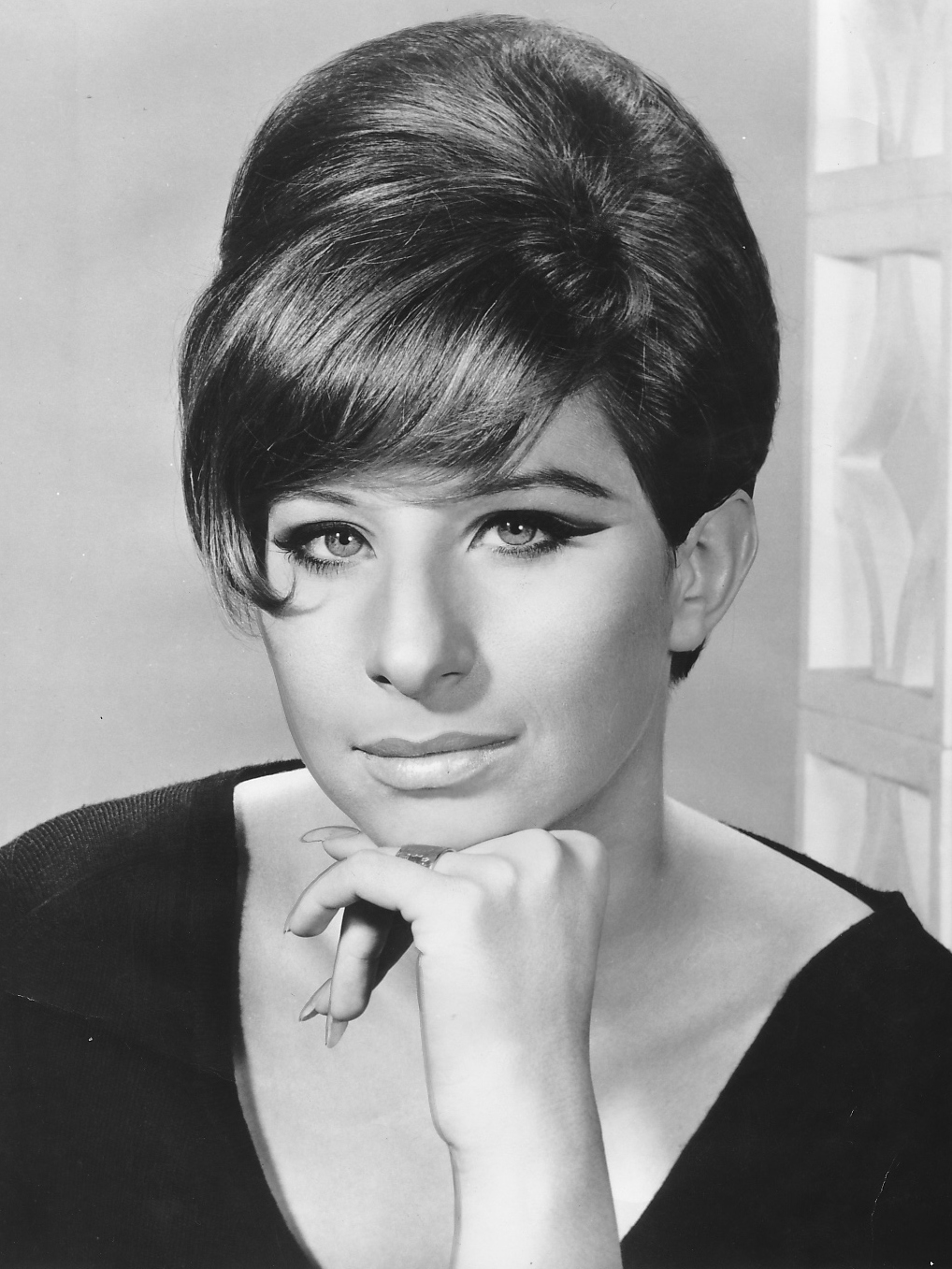
Barbra Streisand

- April 1
  - Chris Buttars, American politician (d. 2018)
  - Samuel R. Delany, American science fiction author
- April 2 – Leon Russell, singer-songwriter, keyboard player and guitarist (d. 2016)
- April 3
  - Marsha Mason, American actress
  - Wayne Newton, American entertainer and singer
  - Billy Joe Royal, American singer (d. 2015)
- April 5 – Peter Magowan, American businessman (d. 2019)
- April 6 – Barry Levinson, American film producer and director
- April 8 – Douglas Trumbull, American film director (d. 2022)
- April 15 – Kenneth Lay, American businessman (d. 2006)
- April 17 – Buster Williams, American jazz bassist
- April 18 – Seymour Stein, American entrepreneur and music executive (d. 2023)
- April 21 – Brendan Malone, American basketball coach (d. 2023)
- April 23 – Sandra Dee, American actress (d. 2005)
- April 24
  - Rege Ludwig, polo instructor and coach
  - Barbra Streisand, American singer, actress, composer, and film director
- April 25 – Jon Kyl, U.S. Senator from Arizona from 1995 to 2013
- April 26 – Bobby Rydell, American singer (d. 2022)
- April 27
  - Ruth Glick, American writer
  - Jim Keltner, American drummer

=== May ===
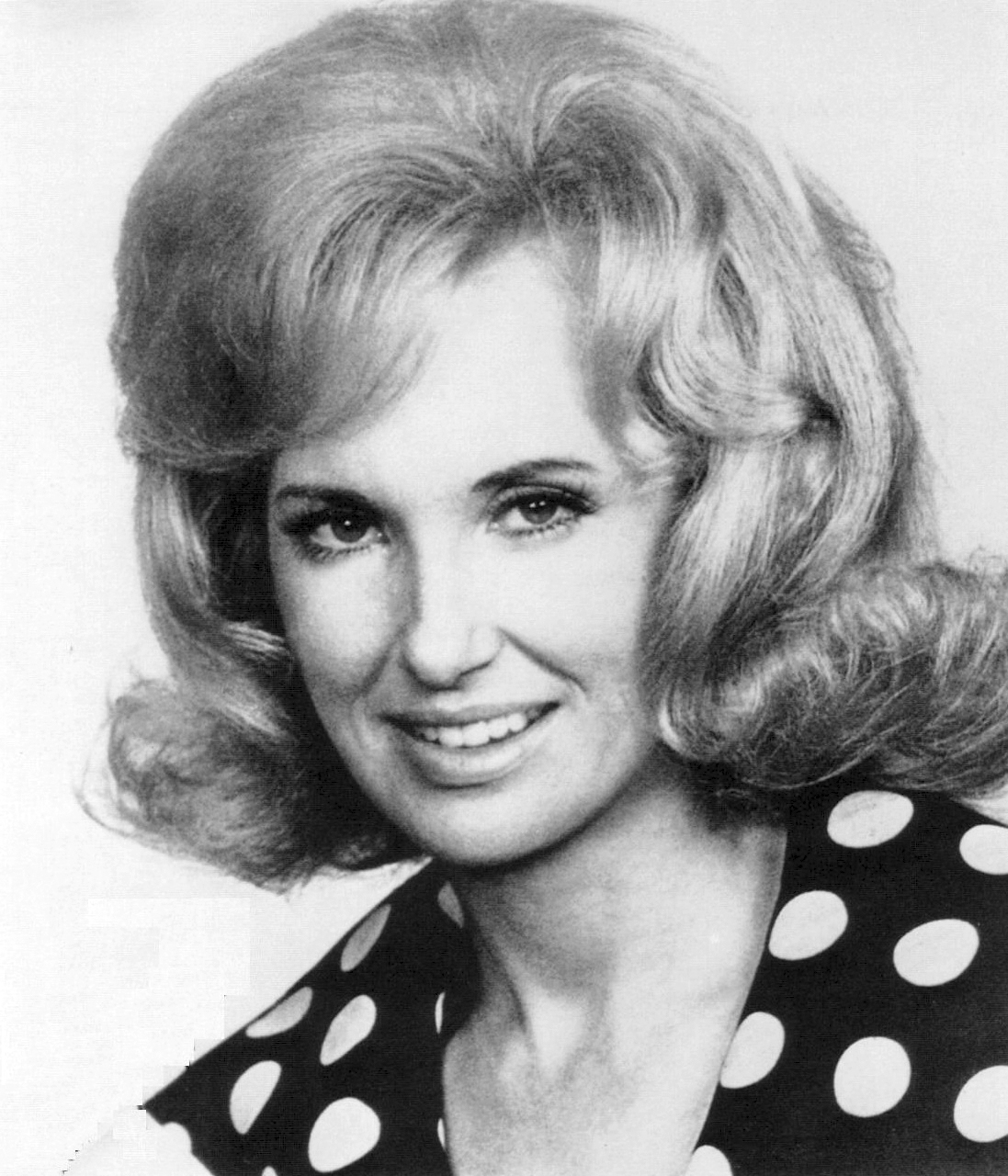
Tammy Wynette

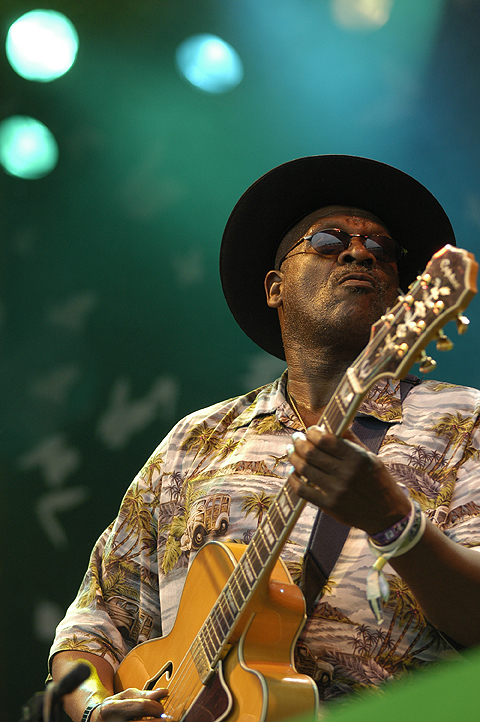
Taj Mahal

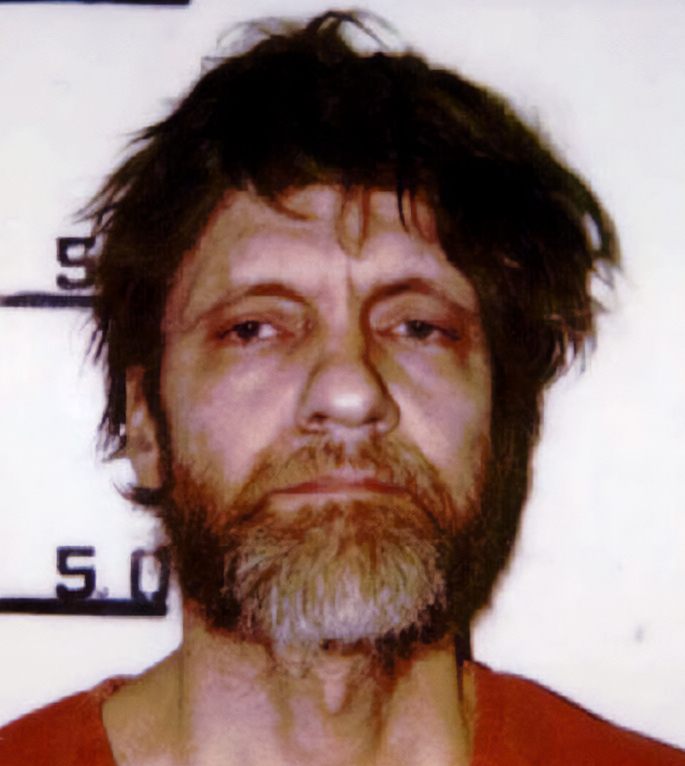
Ted Kaczynski

- May 1
  - Stephen Macht, American actor
  - Jean Saubert, American alpine ski racer (d. 2007)
- May 5 – Tammy Wynette, American country singer (d. 1998)
- May 6 – David Friesen, bassist
- May 9
  - John Ashcroft, United States Attorney General
  - Jerry Buchek, American baseball player (d. 2019)
- May 10
  - Bill Coday, American musician and singer (d. 2008)
  - Ingram Marshall, American composer (d. 2022)
  - Tommy Roe, American singer-songwriter
- May 14 – Byron Dorgan, American politician
- May 15
  - Anthony W. England, American astronaut
  - Lois Johnson, American country music singer (d. 2014)
  - K. T. Oslin, American country singer-songwriter (d. 2020)
- May 17 – Taj Mahal, African-American singer and guitarist
- May 19 – Gary Kildall, American computer scientist and microcomputer entrepreneur (d. 1994)
- May 20 – Carlos Hathcock, American Marine sniper (d. 1999)
- May 21 – Robert C. Springer, American astronaut and test pilot
- May 22
  - Rich Garcia, American Major League Baseball umpire
  - Ted Kaczynski, American mathematician, professor and murderer (d. 2023)
- May 27
  - Priscilla McLean, American composer, performer, video artist, writer, and music reviewer
  - Lee Baca, American law enforcement official and convicted felon
- May 28 – Stanley B. Prusiner, American scientist, recipient of the Nobel Prize in Physiology or Medicine
- May 29 – Kevin Conway, American actor and director (d. 2020)
- May 31 – Happy Hairston, American basketball player (d. 2001)

=== June ===
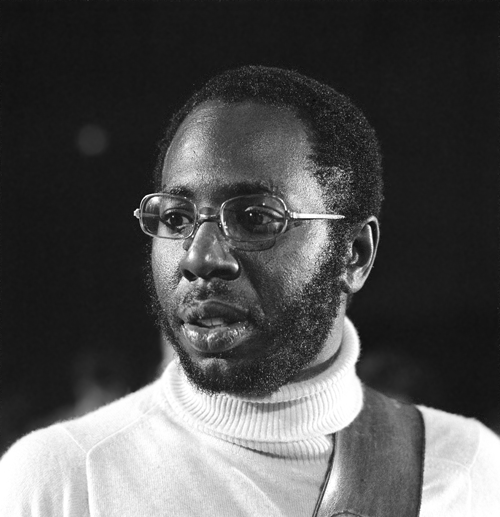
Curtis Mayfield

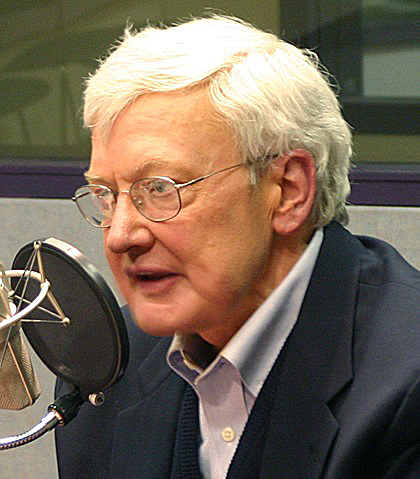
Roger Ebert

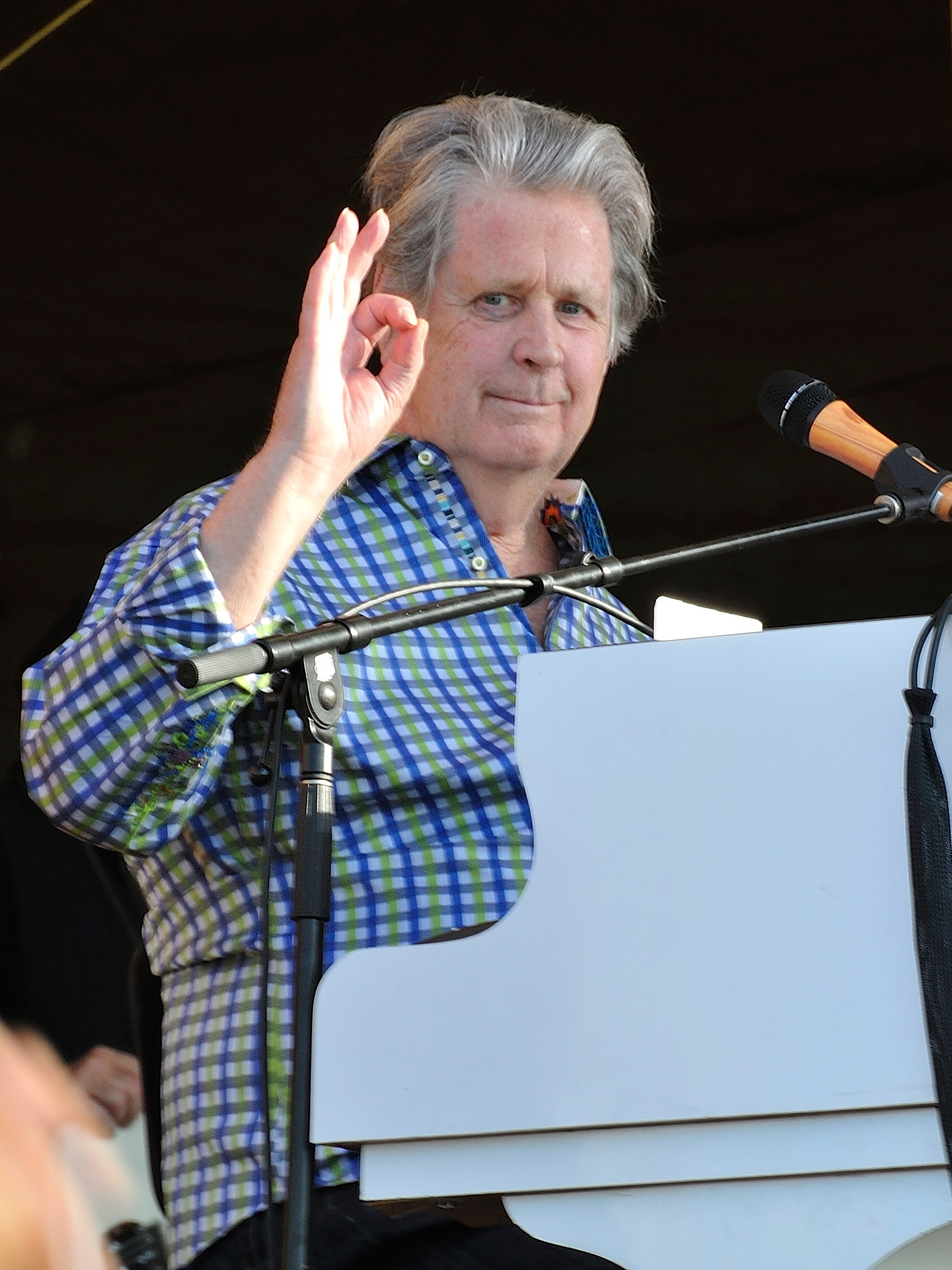
Brian Wilson

- June 3 – Curtis Mayfield, African-American musician (d. 1999)
- June 7
  - Charles Boutin, American lawyer and politician (d. 2021)
  - David Walden, computer scientist (d. 2022)
- June 8
  - Chuck Negron, singer-songwriter and guitarist
  - Andrew Weil, author and educator
- June 18
  - Roger Ebert, film critic (d. 2013)
  - Richard Perry, American record producer (d. 2024)
  - Carl Radle, bass guitarist (d. 1980)
- June 19 – Bob Kasten, U.S. Senator from Wisconsin from 1981 to 1993
- June 20
  - Richard I. Neal, military commander (d. 2022)
  - Brian Wilson, American pop singer, composer and producer (d. 2025)
- June 21
  - T. D. Little, American politician
  - Marjorie Margolies, American politician
  - Nicholas Santora, American criminal (d. 2018)
- June 22 – George Banks, American spree killer
- June 24 – Michele Lee, American actress and singer
- June 25
  - Willis Reed, African-American basketball player, coach and general manager (d. 2023)
  - Richard Stephen Ritchie, U.S. military officer
- June 26
  - J. J. Dillon, American professional wrestling manager
  - Conrad C. Lautenbacher, U.S. Vice Admiral
- June 27 – Bruce Johnston, American singer and songwriter
- June 28
  - Jim Kolbe, American businessman and politician (d. 2022)
  - Dorie Ladner, African-American civil rights activist (d. 2024)
  - Frank Zane, American professional bodybuilder and author

=== July ===
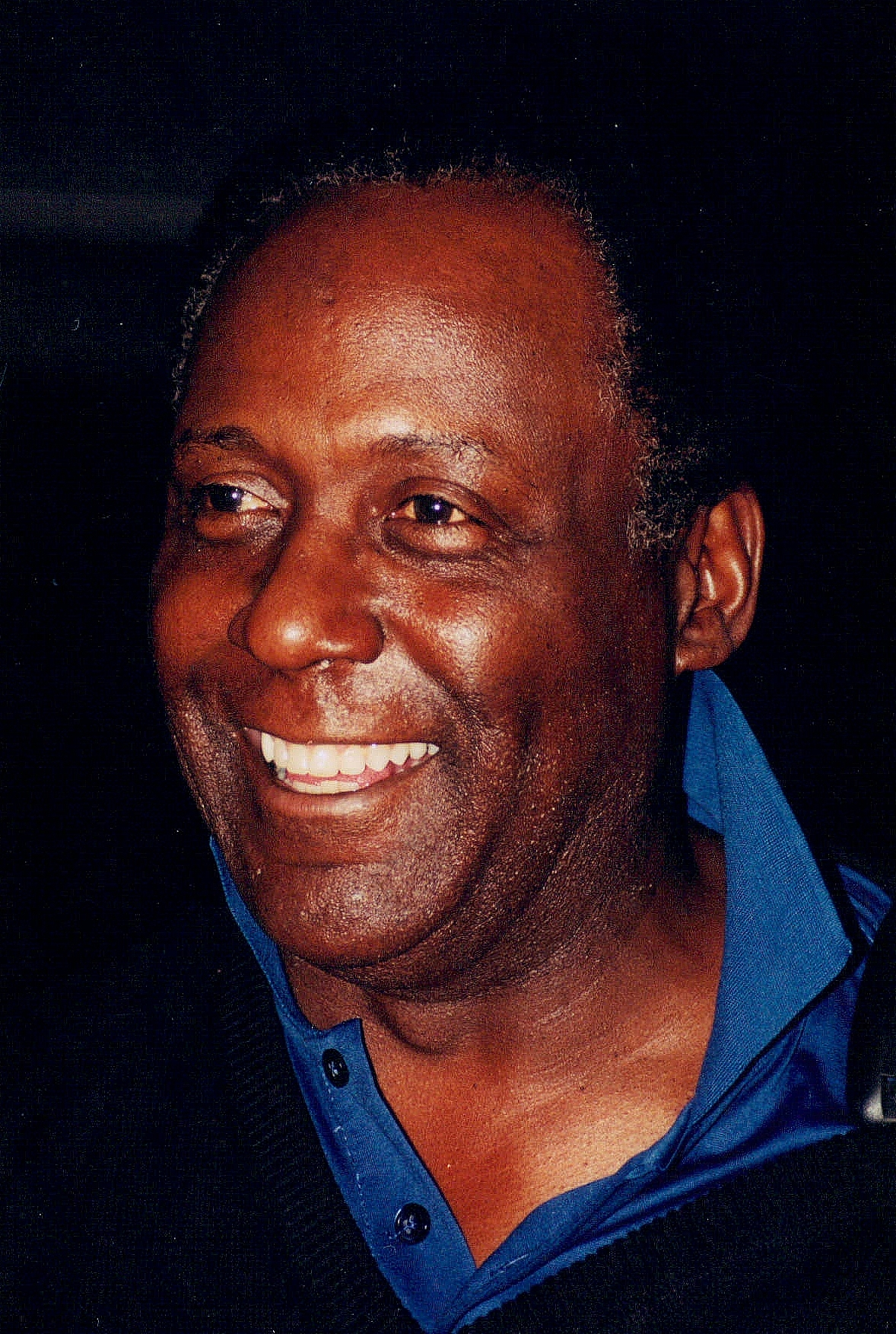
Richard Roundtree

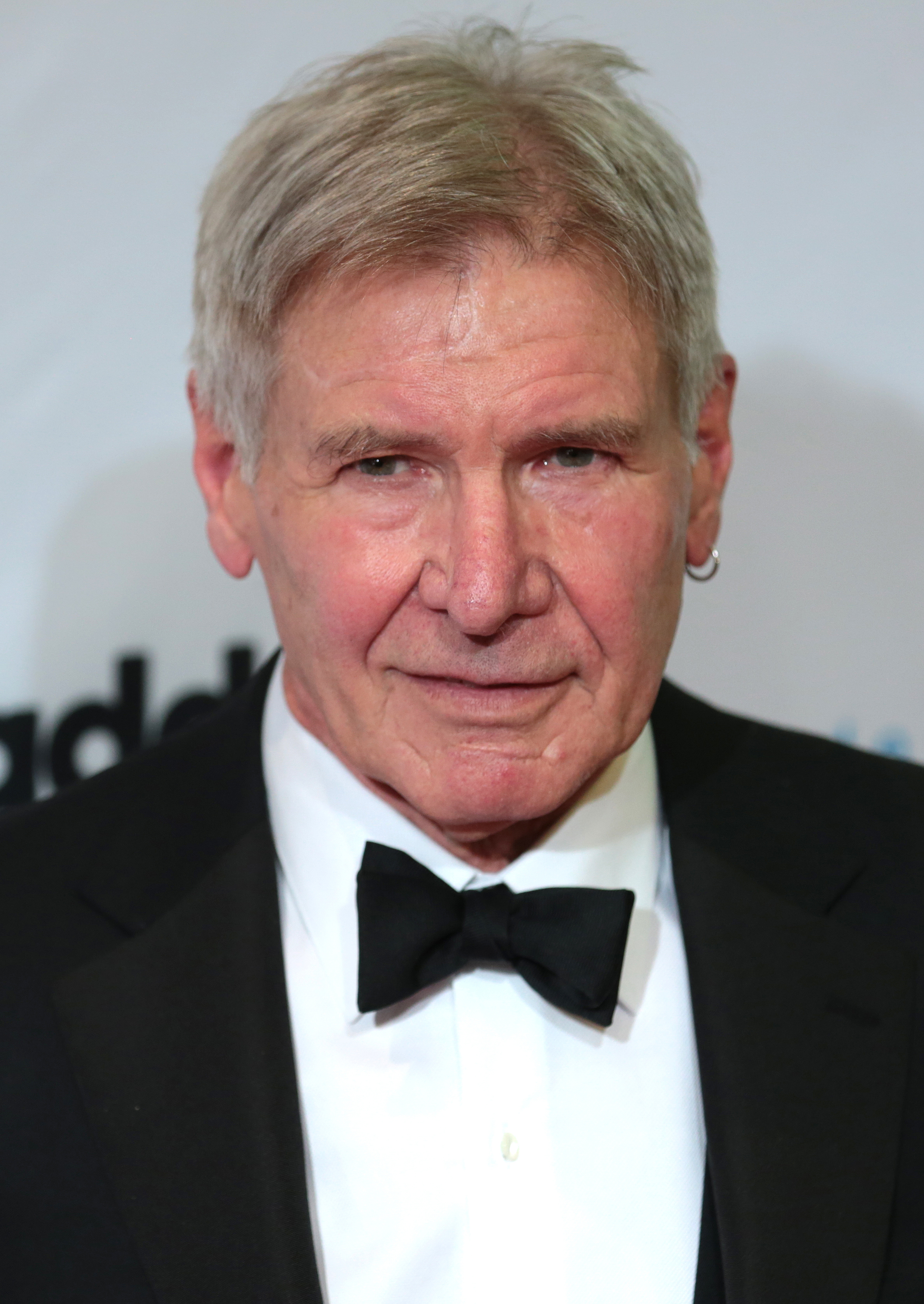
Harrison Ford

- July 1 – Andraé Crouch, American gospel singer (d. 2015)
- July 3
  - Willie Porter, American basketball player
  - Dr. Lonnie Smith, American jazz musician (d. 2021)
- July 4
  - Floyd Little, American football player and coach (d. 2021)
  - Peter Rowan, American singer-songwriter and guitarist (Earth Opera and Old & In the Way)
- July 5 – Louise Shaffer, American actress, script writer, and author
- July 7 – Thomas D. Pollard, American educator, cell biologist and biophysicist
- July 8
  - Norm Clarke, American sportswriter and journalist (d. 2025)
  - Phil Gramm, American politician
- July 9 – Richard Roundtree, African-American actor (d. 2023)
- July 10
  - Ronnie James Dio, American musician (d. 2010)
  - Sixto Rodriguez, American singer-songwriter (d. 2023)
- July 12 – Steve Young, American country music singer-songwriter (d. 2016)
- July 13
  - Harrison Ford, American actor and film producer
  - Roger McGuinn, American musician (The Byrds)
- July 16 – John Purdin, American baseball player (d. 2010)
- July 18 – Bobby Susser, American songwriter and producer (d. 2020)
- July 19 – Frederick Kantor, American physicist (d. 2020)
- July 24 – Chris Sarandon, American actor
- July 27 – Dennis Ralston, American tennis player (d. 2020)
- July 28
  - Neilia Hunter Biden, first wife of Joe Biden (d. 1972)
  - Marty Brennaman, American sportscaster
  - Henry Wessel Jr., photographer and educator (d. 2018)
- July 29 – Tony Sirico, American actor (d. 2022)

=== August ===
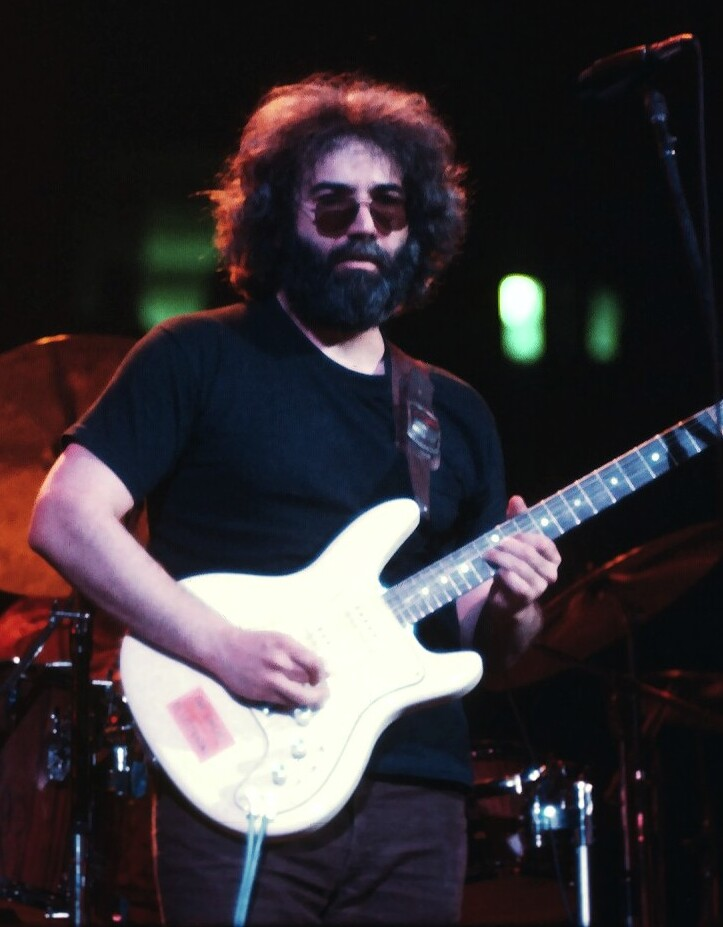
Jerry Garcia

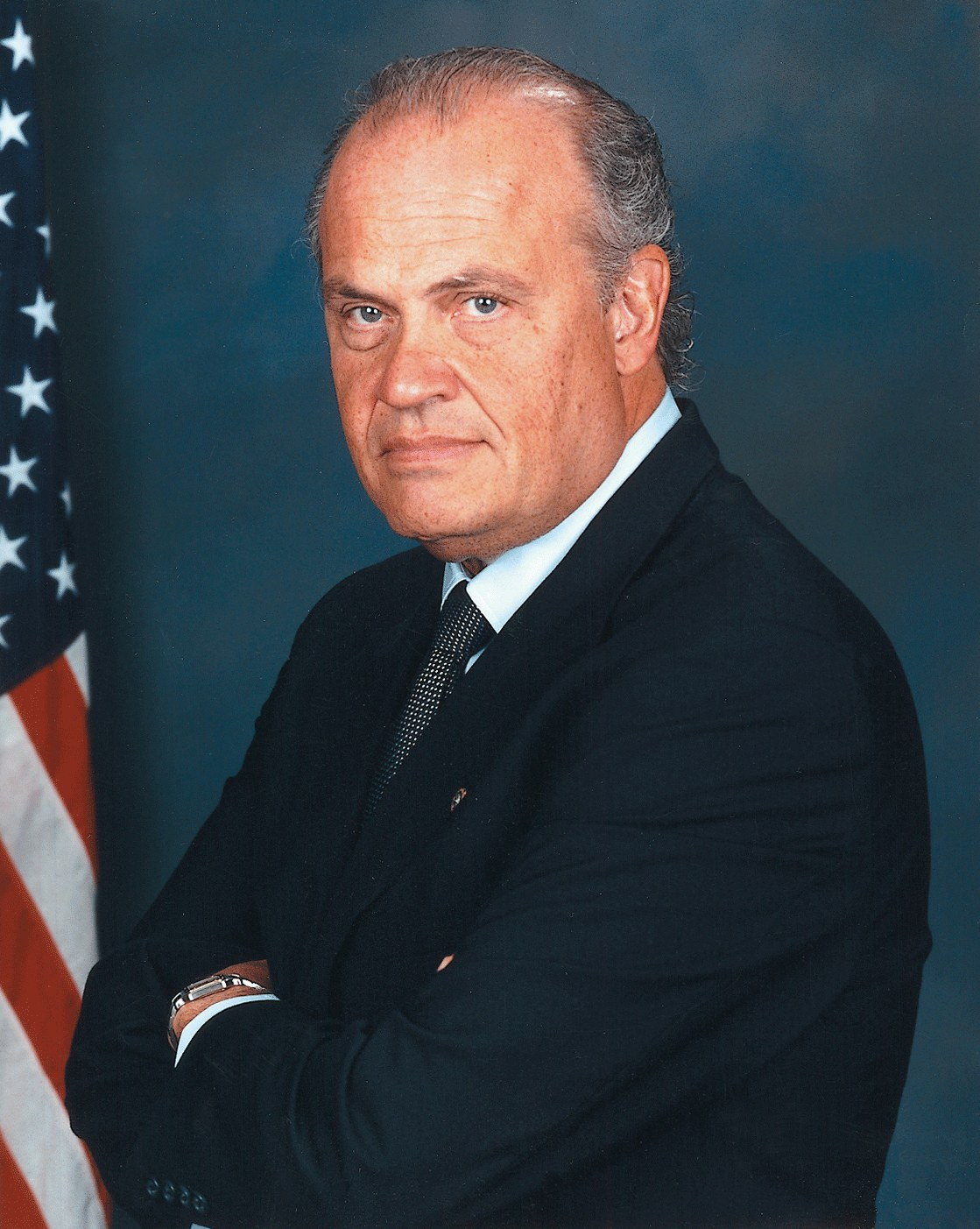
Fred Thompson

- August 1 – Jerry Garcia, American musician (d. 1995)
- August 4
  - Don S. Davis, American actor (d. 2008)
  - Cleon Jones, American baseball player
- August 7
  - Tobin Bell, American film and television actor
  - Jane Fortune, American author, journalist, and philanthropist (d. 2018)
  - Garrison Keillor, American writer and radio host
- August 9
  - Tommie Agee, American baseball player (d. 2001)
  - Jack DeJohnette, American drummer, pianist, and composer (d. 2025)
- August 10 – Speedy Duncan, American football player (d. 2021)
- August 11 – Otis Taylor, American football player (d. 2023)
- August 13
  - Arthur K. Cebrowski, American admiral (d. 2005)
  - Robert L. Stewart, American brigadier and astronaut
- August 16 – Barbara George, American singer-songwriter (d. 2006)
- August 19 – Fred Thompson, American politician and actor (d. 2015)
- August 20 – Isaac Hayes, African-American singer and actor (d. 2008)
- August 23 – Nancy Richey, American tennis player
- August 24
  - Max Cleland, American politician (d. 2021)
  - Karen Uhlenbeck, American mathematician
- August 27 – Daryl Dragon, American musician (d. 2019)
- August 29 – Sterling Morrison, American musician (d. 1995)

=== September ===
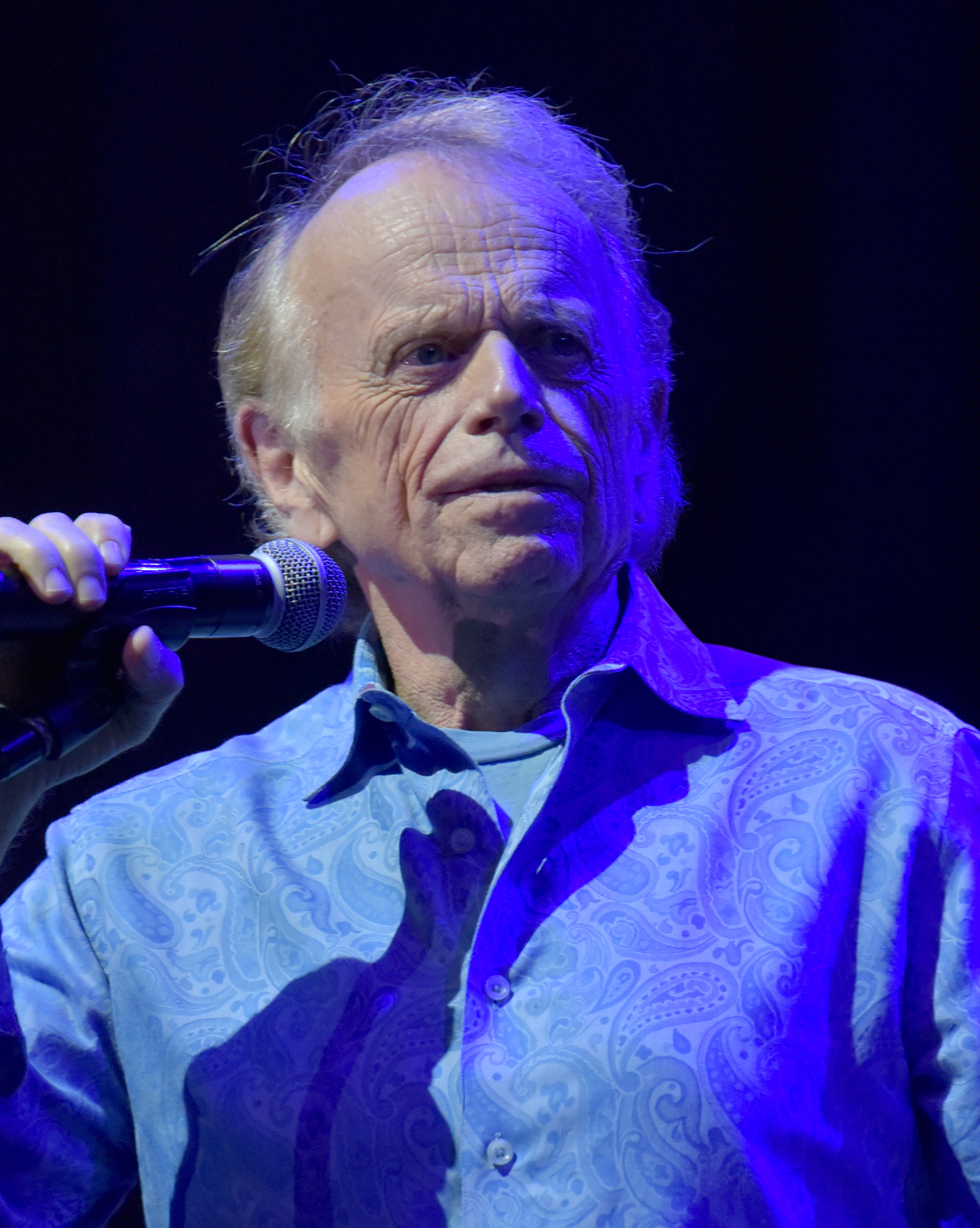
Al Jardine

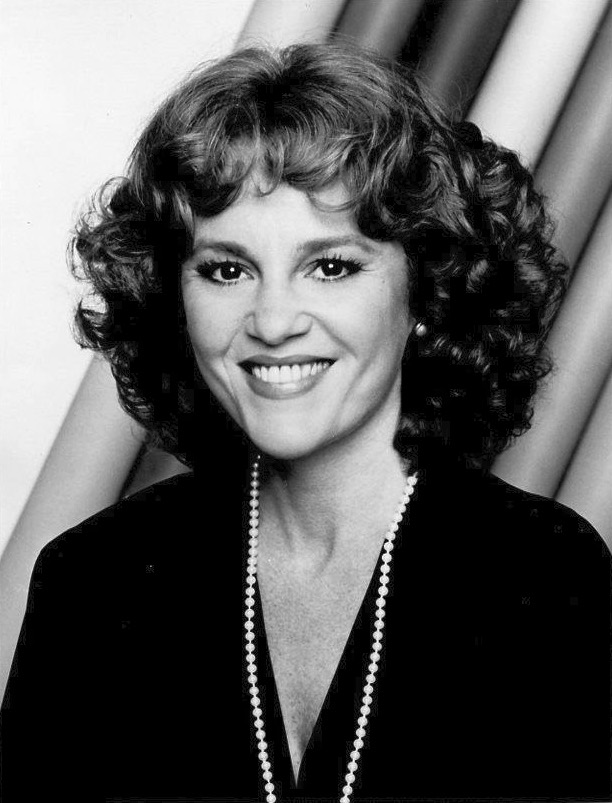
Madeline Kahn

- September 1
  - C. J. Cherryh, American fiction writer
  - Kathy Karpan, American politician (d. 2025)
- September 2 – Robert Shapiro, American lawyer and entrepreneur
- September 3 – Al Jardine, American musician
- September 4
  - Raymond Floyd, American golfer
  - Jerry Jarrett, American businessman and wrestling promoter (d. 2023)
- September 6
  - Carol Wayne, American television and film actress (d. 1985)
  - Mel McDaniel, American country music singer-songwriter (d. 2011)
- September 7 – Robert Godwin, American murder victim (d. 2017)
- September 11 – Lola Falana, American singer, dancer and actress
- September 17 – Lupe Ontiveros, American actress (d. 2012)
- September 18 – Meredith Tax, American feminist writer and political activist (d. 2022)
- September 19 – Freda Payne, American singer and actress
- September 21 – Sam McDowell, American baseball player (d. 2026)
- September 22
  - Larry Jones, American basketball player (d. 2025)
  - David Stern, American businessman and lawyer (d. 2020)
- September 29
  - Madeline Kahn, American actress (d. 1999)
  - Bill Nelson, American politician
- September 30 – Frankie Lymon, American singer (d. 1968)

=== October ===
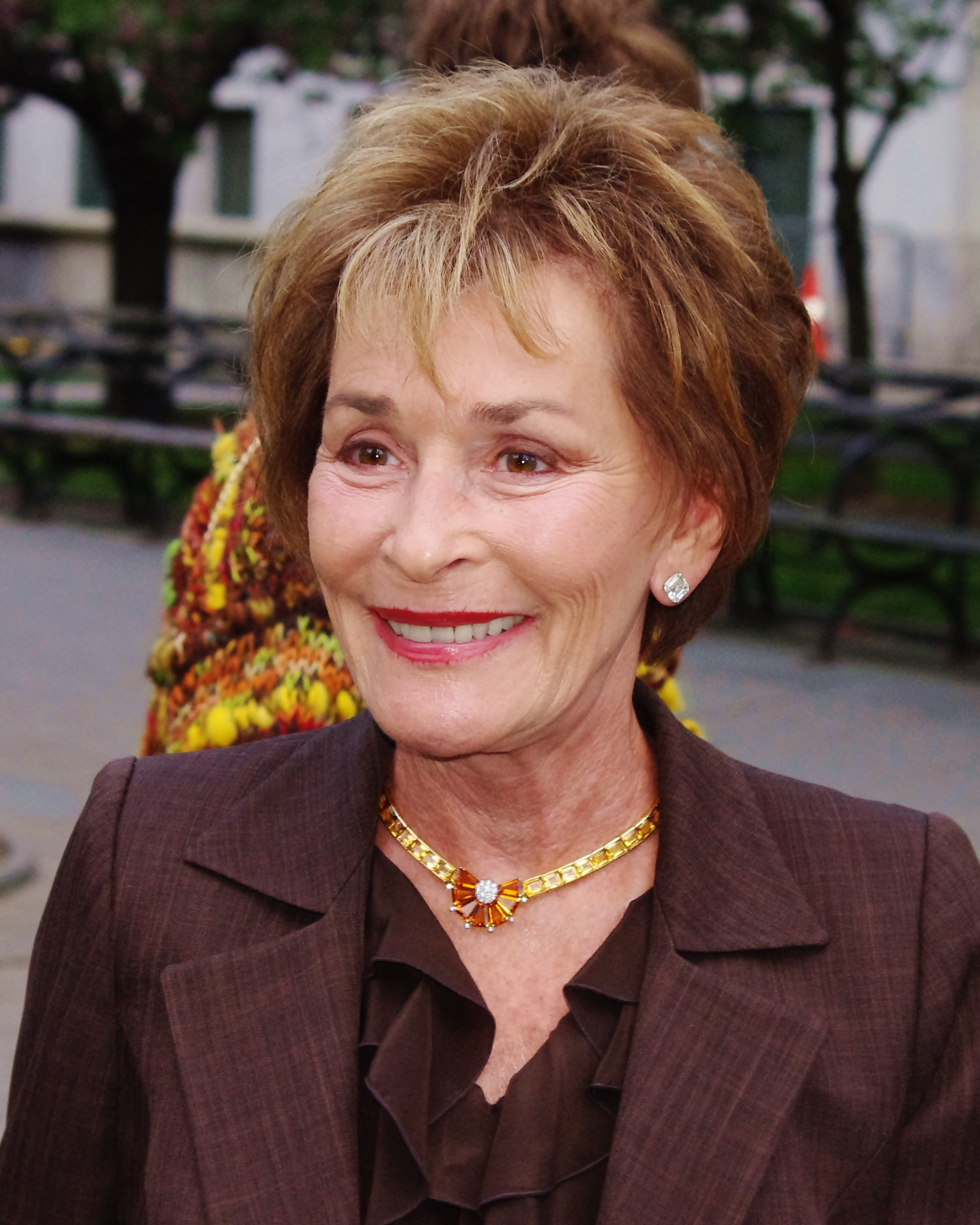
Judy Sheindlin

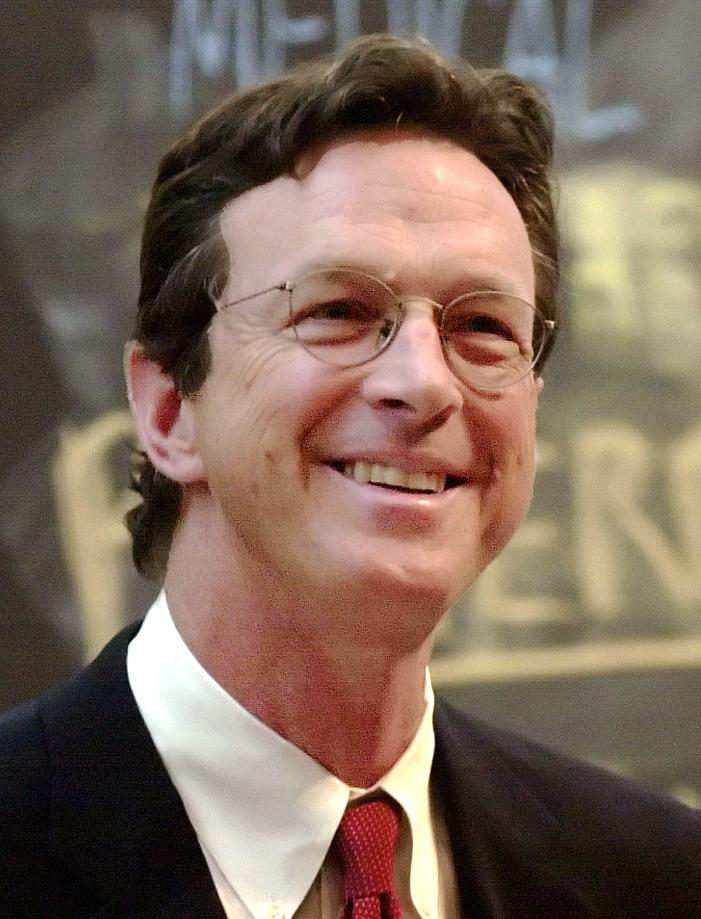
Michael Crichton

- October 1
  - Heinz Kluetmeier, American sports photographer (d. 2025)
  - Jerry Martini, American musician
- October 6
  - Jerry Grote, American baseball player (d. 2024)
  - Fred Travalena, American comedian and impressionist (d. 2009)
- October 7
  - Ronald Baecker, American computer scientist
  - Joy Behar, American comedian and television personality
- October 10 – Janis Hansen, American singer and author (d. 2017)
- October 13 – Jerry Jones, American football team owner
- October 15 – Hilo Chen, Taiwanese-American painter
- October 18 – Eli Noyes, American animator (d. 2024)
- October 19 – Andrew Vachss, American author and attorney (d. 2021)
- October 20 – Earl Hindman, American actor (d. 2003)
- October 21
  - Hugh Dane, African-American actor (d. 2018)
  - Judy Sheindlin, American retired judge turned television personality (Judge Judy)
- October 22
  - Bobby Fuller, American rock singer, songwriter, and guitarist (d. 1966)
  - Annette Funicello, American actress and singer (d. 2013)
  - Pedro Morales, professional wrestler (d. 2019)
- October 23 – Michael Crichton, American author (d. 2008)
- October 24
  - Ruthann Aron, American politician
  - Maggie Blye, American actress (d. 2016)
  - Don Francis, American epidemiologist and virologist
  - Don Gant, American singer-songwriter and producer (d. 1987)
- October 25 – Gloria Katz, American screenwriter and film producer (d. 2018)
- October 28 – Loretta Di Franco, American operatic soprano (d. 2024)
- October 29
  - James Orange, African-American pastor and civil rights activist (d. 2008)
  - Bob Ross, American painter, art instructor and television host (d. 1995)
- October 31 – David Ogden Stiers, American actor and voice-over artist (d. 2018)

=== November ===
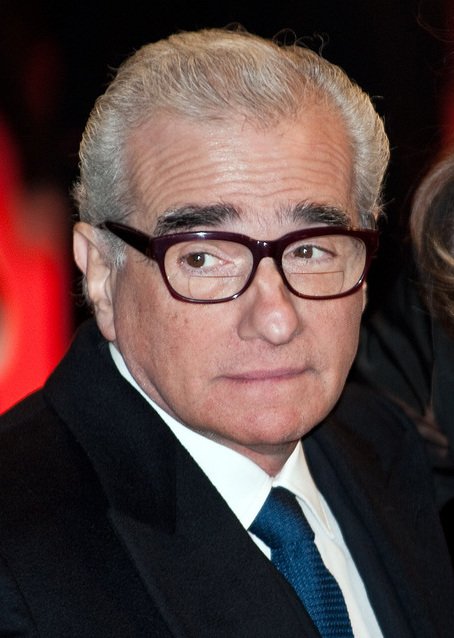
Martin Scorsese

Joe Biden

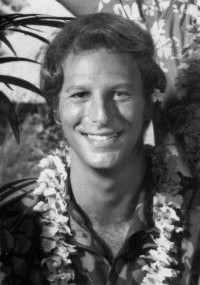
Bob Einstein

- November 1
  - Larry Flynt, American publisher (Hustler) (d. 2021)
  - Yolanda López, American painter (d. 2021)
  - Marcia Wallace, American actress and comedian (d. 2013)
  - Michael Zaslow, American actor (d. 1998)
- November 2
  - Shere Hite, American-born German sexologist (d. 2020 in the United Kingdom)
  - Stefanie Powers, American actress
- November 7
  - Tom Peters, American writer
  - Johnny Rivers, American musician
- November 10 – Robert F. Engle, American economist, Nobel Prize laureate
- November 17
  - Bob Gaudio, American rock singer-songwriter
  - Martin Scorsese, American film director
- November 18
  - Linda Evans, American actress
  - Tyrone C. Fahner, American lawyer and politician (d. 2024)
  - Susan Sullivan, American actress
- November 19 – Dan Haggerty, American actor (d. 2016)
- November 20
  - Joe Biden, 46th president of the United States from 2021 to 2025, 47th vice president of the United States from 2009 to 2017 & U.S. Senator from Delaware from 1973 to 2009
  - Bob Einstein, American actor, producer and screenwriter (d. 2019)
- November 21 – Al Matthews, African-American actor and singer (d. 2018)
- November 22
  - Guion Bluford, African-American astronaut
  - Michael Malone, American author (d. 2022)
  - Dick Stockton, American sports announcer
- November 23 – Susan Anspach, American actress (d. 2018)
- November 26 – Olivia Cole, American actress (d. 2018)
- November 27
  - David Bonderman, American businessman (d. 2024)
  - Jimi Hendrix, African-American rock singer-songwriter (d. 1970)
- November 28
  - Eric Shinseki, American U.S. Army general
  - Paul Warfield, American football player
- November 29 – Ann Dunham, anthropologist and mother of Barack Obama (d. 1995)

=== December ===
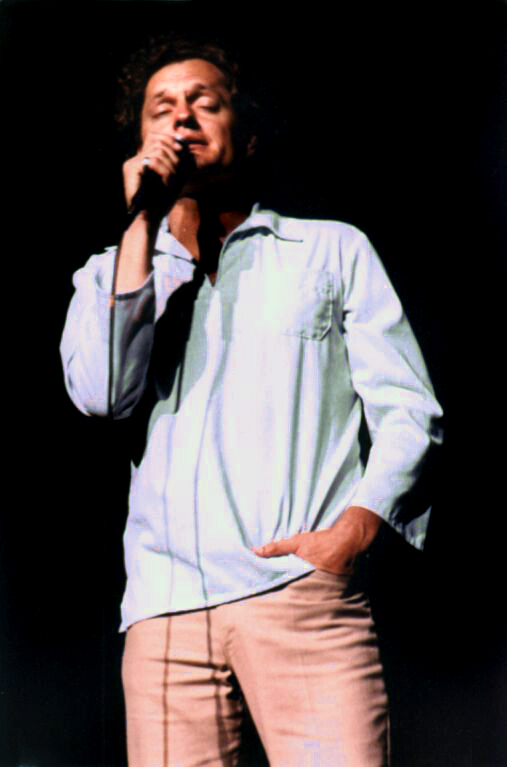
Harry Chapin

- December 1 – John Clauser, American quantum physicist, Nobel Prize laureate
- December 4
  - Dick Billings, American baseball player
  - William "Red" Dawson, American football player and coach
  - Al Hunt, American columnist
  - Steve Tensi, American football player (d. 2024)
- December 6 – Chelsea Brown, American actress (d. 2017)
- December 7
  - Harry Chapin, American singer-songwriter (d. 1981)
  - Reginald Lewis, American businessman (d. 1993)
  - Peter Tomarken, American game-show host (d. 2006)
- December 8 – Bob Love, African-American basketball player (d. 2024)
- December 9 – Dick Butkus, American football player (d. 2023)
- December 13 – Betty-Jean Maycock, American gymnast
- December 15
  - Ken Bowman, American football player (d. 2023)
  - Kathleen Blanco, American politician, 54th Governor of Louisiana (d. 2019)
- December 17 – Paul Butterfield, American musician (d. 1987)
- December 19 – Gene Okerlund, American wrestling announcer (d. 2019)
- December 20
  - Bob Hayes, African-American athlete (d. 2002)
  - Michael P. Johnson, American sociologist
- December 21 – Carla Thomas, American singer
- December 27
  - Muruga Booker, American drummer, composer, inventor, artist and recording artist
  - Charmian Carr, American actress (d. 2016)
  - Thomas Menino, 53rd Mayor of Boston, Massachusetts (d. 2014)
- December 24 – Jonathan Borofsky, American sculptor and printmaker
- December 29 – Gifford Pinchot III, American management consultant
- December 30
  - Betty Aberlin, American actress
  - Allan Gotthelf, American philosopher (d. 2013)
  - Michael Nesmith, American pop musician, songwriter and actor (d. 2021)

== Deaths ==
- January 3 – Charles Mann Hamilton, politician (b. 1874)
- January 4
  - Mel Sheppard, Olympic track athlete (b. 1883)
  - Otis Skinner, stage actor (b. 1858)
- January 6 – John Bernard Flannagan, sculptor, suicide (b. 1895)
- January 16 – Carole Lombard, film actress, air crash (b. 1908)
- January 18
  - James P. Parker, U.S. Navy commodore (b. 1855)
  - Mason Patrick, Chief of United States Air Service, American Expeditionary Forces 1918 (b. 1863)
- January 31 – Ella Holmes White, survivor of the Titanic (b. 1856)
- February 9 – Anna Elizabeth Klumpke, portrait and genre painter (b. 1856)
- February 12 – Grant Wood, painter (b. 1892)
- February 18 – Albert Payson Terhune, journalist and author (b. 1872)
- March 16 – Rachel Field, author and poet (born 1894)
- March 26 – Carolyn Wells, prolific novelist and poet (b. 1862)
- April 18 – Gertrude Vanderbilt Whitney, founder of the Whitney Museum of American Art (b. 1875)
- April 27 – Arthur L. Bristol, U.S. Navy admiral (b. 1886)
- May 29 – John Barrymore, actor (b. 1882)
- June 4 – killed in action at the Battle of Midway
  - William Abercrombie, U.S. Navy officer and aviator (b. 1914)
  - Edgar R. Bassett, U.S. Navy officer (b. 1914)
  - Robert Boyd Brazier, US Navy aviation radioman, killed in action at the Battle of Midway (b. 1916)
  - John Clarence Butler, US Navy officer, killed in action at the Battle of Midway (b. 1921)
  - Harold John Ellison, U.S. Navy officer (b. 1917)
  - Eugene A. Greene, US Navy officer, killed in action at the Battle of Midway (b. 1921)
  - John William Haas, US Navy pilot, killed in action at the Battle of Midway (b. 1907)
  - Patrick H. Hart, US Navy officer, killed in action at the Battle of Midway (b. 1915)
  - Lofton R. Henderson, U.S. Marine Corps aviator and commanding officer of Marine Scout Bomber Squadron 241 (VMSB-241) (b. 1903)
  - Ernest Lenard Hilbert, US Navy aviator, killed in action at the Battle of Midway (b. 1920)
  - Curtis W. Howard, US Navy officer, killed in action at the Battle of Midway (b. 1917)
  - Charles Kleinsmith, US Navy Chief Petty officer and sailor, killed in action at the Battle of Midway (b. 1904)
  - Eugene E. Lindsey, US Navy officer, killed in action at the Battle of Midway (b. 1905)
  - Lance Edward Massey, US Navy pilot, killed in action at the Battle of Midway (b. 1909)
  - Walter Harold Mosley, US Navy officer, killed in action at the Battle of Midway (b. 1916)
  - Carl A. Osberg, US Navy pilot, killed in action at the Battle of Midway (b. 1920)
  - Floyd B. Parks, US Marine Corps officer, killed in action at the Battle of Midway (b. 1911)
  - Oswald A. Powers, US Navy officer, killed in action at the Battle of Midway (b. 1915)
  - David John Roche, US Navy officer, killed in action at the Battle of Midway (b. 1918)
  - Richard Wayne Suesens, US Navy officer, killed in action at the Battle of Midway (b. 1915)
  - John C. Waldron, U.S. Navy aviator and commander of Torpedo Squadron 8 (b. 1900)
  - Frederick T. Weber, US Navy aviator, killed in action at the Battle of Midway (b. 1916)
  - Osborne B. Wiseman, US Navy aviator, killed in action at the Battle of Midway (b. 1915)
- June 5
  - Samuel Adams, US Navy officer, killed in action at the Battle of Midway (b. 1912)
  - Virginia Lee Corbin, silent film actress (b. 1910)
  - Royal R. Ingersoll II, US Navy officer, killed in action at the Battle of Midway (b. 1913)
- June 19 – Frank Irons, Olympic field athlete (b. 1886)
- June 23 – William Couper, sculptor (b. 1853)
- June 30 – William Henry Jackson, explorer and photographer (b. 1843)
- July 30 – Jimmy Blanton, African American jazz double bassist (b. 1918)
- August 3 – James Cruze, actor and director (b. 1884)
- August 7
  - Louis J. Carpellotti, U.S. marine, killed in action (b. 1918)
  - Charles E. Ford, film director and producer (b. 1899)
- August 30 – John Willard, playwright and actor (b. 1885)
- September 7 – Cecilia Beaux, portrait painter (b. 1855)
- October 5 – Dorothea Klumpke, astronomer (b. 1861)
- November 4 – Eleanor Stackhouse Atkinson, novelist and textbook and children's writer (b. 1863)
- November 30 – Anthony M. Rud, writer (b. 1893)
- December 5 – Richard Tucker, film actor (b. 1884)
- December 6 – Amos Rusie, baseball player (b. 1871)
- December 7 – Orland Steen Loomis, Governor of Wisconsin (b. 1893)
- December 8 – Albert Kahn, architect (b. 1869 in Germany)
- December 12
  - Helen Gilman Noyes Brown, philanthropist (b. 1867)
  - Helen Westley, character actress (b. 1875)
- December 13 – Robert Robinson Taylor, first accredited African American architect (b. 1868)
- December 21 – Franz Boas, anthropologist (b. 1858 in Germany)
- December 27 – William G. Morgan, inventor of volleyball (b. 1870)

== See also ==
- List of American films of 1942
- Timeline of United States history (1930–1949)
- Timeline of World War II
