= Rege Ludwig =

- Born: April 24, 1942 (age 82); Pennsylvania
- Spouse: Janet Ludwig (m. 1972)
- Children: Kirsten (b. 1981); Dawson (b. 1983)
- Website: RegeLudwigPolo.com

Rege Ludwig is a polo instructor and high-goal coach who has been playing and instructing polo for over 30 years.

== Biography ==
One of his earliest and notable achievements was coaching the Aspen Polo Team with Doug Mathews, Memo Gracida (10 goals), Carlos Gracida (10 goals) and Tiger Neece to the winner’s circle of the US Open Polo Championship. Since his victory, Rege has coached many other high goal players such as Thomas Winter, Andre Weiss, Fabio Diniz, Sebastian Merlos, Julio Arellano, Piki Alberdi and Juan Martin Nero. Additionally, in 1998 Rege coached the United States Polo Team in the Federation of International World Polo Championship.

He is a contributing writer for Polo Player’s Edition, Germany’s Pace Polosport Magazine, and Polo Times. He is a member of the governing committees for polo in the United States. In 1994 at the request of the Hurlingham Polo Association he was chief umpire lecturer and forum head for the senior umpires and top ranked players in the UK. He is author of the polo DVD/video POLO: Hitting the Ball with Power and Accuracy, which has been adopted by the Federation of International Polo and distributed to all participating countries. He coaches annually in France, Germany, England, Switzerland, Belgium, Thailand, Canada and Denmark.

He has worked with players at all levels of polo. Of the registered polo-playing members in the United States, 35% have worked with Rege on their polo at one time or another. He conducted the Virginia Polo Clinic at the University of Virginia for over 25 years which has become a highly influential clinic. His polo clinics offer an introduction to polo as well as a refresher course for the experienced players. The primary purpose of the clinics is to give the players the chance to learn and improve upon their skills necessary to play polo and the opportunity to put these skills to use under game conditions.

He is based out of the Thai Polo Club, located near Bangkok, Thailand during the months of November through April. During the summer he travels to Europe, Canada, United States to teach and coach polo. He currently resides in Colorado on his ranch.
