= Larry L. Taylor =

United States Army officer (1942–2024)

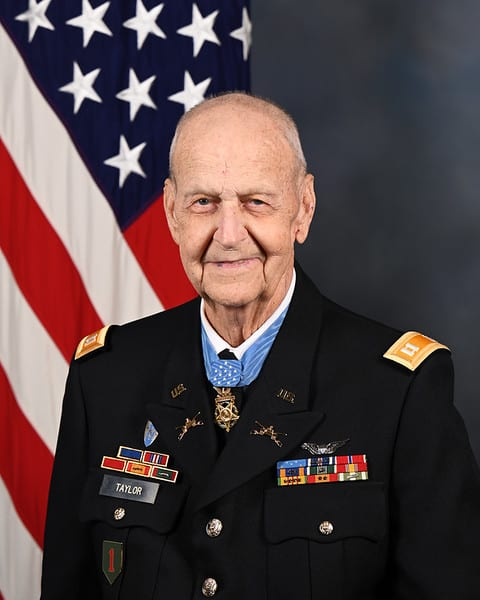
- Official portrait, 2023
- Born: 12 February 1942; Chattanooga, Tennessee, U.S.
- Died: 28 January 2024 (aged 81); Signal Mountain, Tennessee, U.S.
- Military career
- Branch: United States Army
- Service years: 1966–1971
- Rank: Captain
- Nickname: Darkhorse 32
- Units: 1st Squadron, 4th Cavalry Regiment
- Conflicts: Vietnam War
- Awards: Medal of Honor; Distinguished Flying Cross (4); Bronze Star Medal; Air Medal (43); Republic of Vietnam Gallantry Cross

Larry L. Taylor (12 February 1942 – 28 January 2024) was a United States Army officer and helicopter pilot who was awarded the Medal of Honor on 5 September 2023 for his actions on 18 June 1968 during the Vietnam War.

== Early life and education ==
Taylor was born on 12 February 1942 and raised in Chattanooga, Tennessee, and attended the University of Tennessee in Knoxville, where he served in the Reserve Officers' Training Corps.

Following his graduation in June 1966, Taylor attended the United States Army Armor School at Fort Knox, then trained on helicopters at Fort Wolters and then Fort Rucker, graduating as an army aviator on 30 June 1967.

== Military career ==
Taylor was sent to South Vietnam in August 1967 joining D Troop, 1st Squadron, 4th Cavalry Regiment, part of the 1st Infantry Division, at Bien Hoa Air Base.

On the night of 18 June 1968, Taylor, together with his gunner CWO2 J. O. Ratliff, rescued a four-man long-range reconnaissance patrol (LRRP) that had been surrounded by Vietcong forces near the village of Ap Go Cong, Bình Dương province. After exhausting his munitions, Taylor (callsign Darkhorse 32) landed his AH-1G Cobra and the four LRRP soldiers clung to the skids and rocket pods of the helicopter as Taylor flew them to safety. For his actions, Taylor was originally awarded the Silver Star. His Silver Star was upgraded to the Medal of Honor in 2023.

Taylor flew over 2,000 combat missions during the Vietnam War in the Cobra and the UH-1, was engaged by enemy fire 340 times and was shot down five times.

Following his Vietnam service, he served in the 2nd Cavalry Regiment in West Germany.

Taylor left active duty in 1971 with the rank of Captain.

== Death ==
Taylor died at his home in Signal Mountain, Tennessee, on 28 January 2024, at the age of 81, after "a long struggle with cancer".

== Honors and awards ==
Taylor's personal decorations include: the Medal of Honor (upgraded in 2023 from a Silver Star awarded 1968), Distinguished Flying Cross (4), Bronze Star Medal, Air Medal (43), and the Republic of Vietnam Gallantry Cross, with 2 bronze stars.

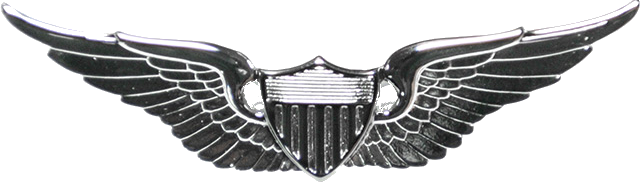

Army Aviator Badge
Medal of Honor (Upgraded from Silver Star)	Distinguished Flying Cross with three bronze oak leaf clusters	Bronze Star Medal
Air Medal with Award numeral 43	Army Commendation Medal with bronze oak leaf cluster	National Defense Service Medal
Vietnam Service Medal with four bronze campaign stars	Republic of Vietnam Gallantry Cross with two bronze stars	Vietnam Campaign Medal

Army Presidential Unit Citation		Valorous Unit Award
Meritorious Unit Commendation	Republic of Vietnam Gallantry Cross Unit Citation	Republic of Vietnam Civil Actions Unit Citation

=== Medal of Honor citation ===
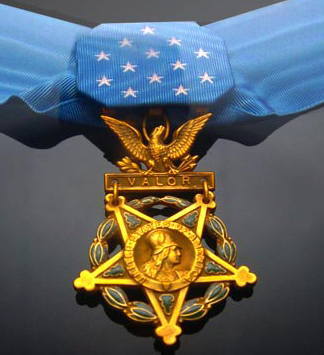

The President of the United States of America, authorized by Act of Congress, March 3rd, 1863, has awarded in the name of Congress the Medal of Honor to First Lieutenant Larry L. Taylor, United States Army, for conspicuous gallantry and intrepidity at the risk of his life above and beyond the call of duty.

First Lieutenant Larry L. Taylor distinguished himself by acts of gallantry and intrepidity above and beyond the call of duty while serving with Troop Delta, 1st Squadron, 4th Cavalry, 1st Infantry Division on June 18th, 1968, near the village of Ap Go Cong, Republic of Vietnam.

On this date, First Lieutenant Taylor commanded a light fire team of two Cobra helicopter gunships scrambled on a nighttime mission in response to an urgent call for aerial fire support from a four-man, long-range patrol team.

Upon arrival, First Lieutenant Taylor found the patrol team surrounded and heavily engaged by a larger Viet Cong force. He immediately requested illumination rounds and supporting artillery to assist with identifying the enemy positions.

Despite intense enemy groundfire, he flew at a perilously low altitude, placing a devastating volume of aerial rocket and machine gun fire on the enemy forces encircling the friendly patrol.

For over approximately 45 minutes, First Lieutenant Taylor and his wingman continued to make low-level, danger-close attack runs on the surrounding enemy positions.

When enemy fire increased from the village of Ap Go Cong, he requested artillery rounds with lower illumination altitudes be fired on that portion of the village so that the burning rounds ignited the enemy positions.

With both Cobra gunships nearly out of ammunition and the enemy still closing in on the patrol team, First Lieutenant Taylor flew the patrol team's potential ground evacuation route, founding it – finding it unviable based on the heavy enemy ground fire encountered.

Returning to the patrol team's location, he continued to circle it at a low level under intense enemy fire, employing his searchlight to make fake gun runs on the enemy positions to distract them from the patrol team.

Running low on fuel and with the patrol team nearly out of ammunition, First Lieutenant Taylor decided to extract the team with his two-man Cobra helicopter gunship – a feat never before accomplished.

He directed his wingman to fire their remaining minigun rounds on the patrol team's east flank. First Lieutenant Taylor then fired his own last minigun rounds on the enemy positions, opening an avenue of movement to the east for the patrol team.

He directed the patrol team to move 100 yards towards the extraction point, where First Lieutenant Taylor, still under enemy fire, landed his helicopter and instructed the patrol team to climb aboard anywhere they could.

With the four-man, long-range patrol team seated on rocket pods and skids, he evacuated them to the nearest friendly location, undoubtedly saving their lives.

First Lieutenant Taylor's conspicuous gallantry, his profound concern for his fellow soldiers, and his intrepidity at the risk of his life above and beyond the call of duty are in keeping with the highest traditions of military service and reflect great credit upon himself, his unit, and the United States Army.

== See also ==
- List of Medal of Honor recipients for the Vietnam War
