= USS Bassett =

US Navy (then Colombian) high-speed transport

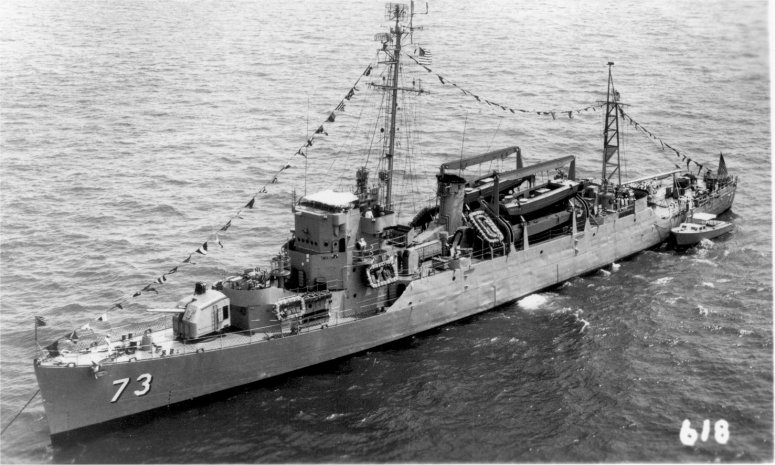
- USS Bassett

History

United States
- Name: USS Bassett
- Namesake: Edgar R. Bassett
- Builder: Consolidated Steel Corporation, Orange, Texas
- Laid down: 28 November 1943, as Buckley-class destroyer escort
- Launched: 15 January 1944
- Sponsored by: Mrs. Margaret Bassett
- Identification: Hull number: DE-672
- Commissioned: 23 February 1945
- Decommissioned: 29 April 1946
- Reclassified: APD-73, 27 June 1944
- Recommissioned: 7 December 1950
- Decommissioned: 26 November 1957
- Stricken: 1 May 1967
- Fate: Transferred to Colombia, 6 September 1968

Colombia
- Name: ARC Almirante Tono
- Namesake: Rafael Tono Llopiz
- Acquired: 6 September 1968
- Identification: Pennant number: DT-04

General characteristics
- Class & type: Charles Lawrence-class high speed transport
- Displacement: 1,400 long tons (1,422 t)
- Length: 306 ft (93 m) overall
- Beam: 36 ft 10 in (11.23 m)
- Draft: 13 ft 6 in (4.11 m) maximum
- Installed power: 12,000 shaft horsepower (16 megawatts)
- Propulsion: Two boilers; two GE steam turbines (turbo-electric transmission)
- Speed: 24 knots (44 km/h; 28 mph)
- Range: 6,000 nautical miles (11,000 km) at 12 knots (22 km/h; 14 mph)
- Troops: 162
- Complement: 186
- Armament: 1 × 5 in (130 mm) gun; 6 × 40 mm guns; 6 × 20 mm guns; 2 × depth charge tracks

USS Bassett (APD-73), ex-DE-672, is a United States Navy high-speed transport in commission from 1945 to 1946 and from 1950 to 1957.

The ship was named for Edgar Rees Bassett, who was a naval aviator killed during the Battle of Midway in June 1942.

== Construction and commissioning ==
Bassett was laid down as the Buckley-class destroyer escort USS Bassett (DE-672) on 28 November 1943 by the Consolidated Steel Corporation at Orange, Texas, and launched as such on 15 January 1944, sponsored by Mrs. Margaret Bassett, mother of the ship's namesake. She was reclassified as a Charles Lawrence-class high speed transport and redesignated APD-73 on 27 June 1944. After conversion to her new role, the ship was commissioned on 23 February 1945.

== Service history ==
=== World War II ===
Following shakedown in the Chesapeake Bay and off Guantanamo Bay, Cuba, which she completed on 9 April 1945, Bassett underwent post-shakedown repairs at Norfolk, Virginia, before departing for World War II service in the Pacific. Reporting to the United States Pacific Fleet for duty on 1 May 1945, Bassett carried out amphibious warfare training exercises out of Pearl Harbor, Territory of Hawaii, before escorting convoys to places which included Eniwetok in the Marshall Islands, Guam in the Mariana Islands, Ulithi Atoll in the Caroline Islands, Hollandia in New Guinea, and ultimately Leyte in the Philippine Islands. Upon reporting at Leyte for duty with the Commander, Philippine Sea Frontier, Bassett delivered mail and passengers to various ports in the Philippine archipelago and to Brunei Bay, Borneo.

After returning to Leyte on 26 July 1945, Bassett conducted antisubmarine warfare patrols off Borneo. On 2 August 1945 while carrying out that duty north of Leyte, she received reports of large groups of survivors some 200 nautical miles (370 kilometers) away and altered course to investigate. Within 10 hours, Bassett joined in the rescue of survivors from the heavy cruiser USS Indianapolis, which had been torpedoed and sunk by the Japanese submarine I-58. After reaching the scene of the tragedy, Bassett rescued 154 Indianapolis survivors in a four-hour search and took them to the fleet hospital before returning to Leyte. Initially, its captain did not want to risk exposing the ship to possible enemy Japanese submarines, and ordered search lights turned off. The crew defiantly refused and kept the sublights on and ordered their own captain to be confined in his quarters.

=== Postwar ===
Following a brief voyage to Hollandia, Bassett was assigned to Amphibious Group 8, to take part in the occupation of Japan, which followed the surrender of Japan on 15 August 1945. She supported the landings at Wakayama, near the key port of Kure, and at Nagoya, on Honshu, before serving as a harbor entrance control ship at Nagoya.

Detached from these duties on 18 November 1945, Bassett participated in Operation Magic Carpet, the massive homeward-bound movement of veterans, embarking passengers at Sasebo, Japan. Upon returning these men to the United States West Coast, Bassett tarried briefly at San Diego, California, before shifting her area of operations to the Atlantic Ocean. Following repairs at the Philadelphia Naval Shipyard at Philadelphia, Pennsylvania, Bassett was assigned to the Florida Group of the 16th Fleet, later the Atlantic Reserve Fleet. Decommissioned on 29 April 1946, Bassett was laid up at Green Cove Springs, Florida, and remained inactive there for four and a half years.

=== 1950s ===
Recommissioned on 7 December 1950 Bassett proceeded to Jacksonville, Florida, for repairs at the Merrill Stephens Drydock and Repair Company. After reporting for duty to the Commander, Amphibious Force, United States Atlantic Fleet, on 19 December 1950, Bassett departed for Norfolk.

Over the next seven years, Bassett operated out of Norfolk with the amphibious arm of the Atlantic Fleet. Her initial assignments took her to Havana, Cuba; St. Thomas in the United States Virgin Islands; and Roosevelt Roads, Puerto Rico. They also included cold-weather reconnaissance work carried out in cooperation with United States Marine Corps units. She escorted convoys, participated in amphibious landings, and performed plane guard duty. In June 1952, Bassett began her first midshipmen training cruise, during which she visited Greenock, Scotland, and several French ports.

In 1953, Bassett's duties took her to Morehead City, North Carolina; Vieques Island, Puerto Rico; St. Croix, U.S. Virgin Islands; and the British West Indies. She stood plane guard duty for the escort aircraft carrier USS Mindoro during October 1953.

In June 1954, unrest in Guatemala prompted her despatch to Central America to observe the situation. Upon her return from Caribbean duty, Bassett carried out another midshipmen training cruise, this time to Canada and Puerto Rico.

Bassett completed repairs at the Charleston Naval Shipyard at Charleston, South Carolina, during the summer of 1955 and returned to active duty on 6 September 1955. She cleared Charleston on that day and stood into Guantanamo Bay on 25 September 1955. Bassett spent one night there before getting underway to search for a Navy hurricane-hunting plane lost in the Caribbean while tracking Hurricane Janet. However, her five-day hunt failed to locate the plane or its crew.

Bassett next received orders to proceed to British Honduras to assist victims of Hurricane Janet. En route, she received orders directing her to put into the port of Tampico, Mexico, where raging floods caused by the hurricane had engulfed 32,000 square miles (82,979 square kilometers) of Mexican territory, causing loss of both lives and property. While at Tampico, Bassett assisted light aircraft carrier USS Saipan in carrying out relief work and rendered invaluable service herself by bringing supplies to the needy people along the swollen Rio Panuco and by rescuing marooned people.

Upon the completion of her hurricane relief mission, Bassett returned to Guantanamo Bay, arriving there on 17 October 1955. Finishing her training evolutions by 18 November 1955, she departed for the United States and reached Norfolk in time for her men to enjoy Thanksgiving with their families.

Following amphibious transport training at Norfolk in late November and early December 1955, Bassett then carried out amphibious operations in the Naval Amphibious Base Little Creek area at Virginia Beach, Virginia, into January 1956. Later that month, she operated with elements of the United States Army's 77th Special Forces. Bassett spent the remainder of February and the early part of March 1956 at Little Creek or in nearby waters.

On 20 March 1956, Bassett departed for the Mediterranean and her first deployment with the United States Sixth Fleet. Passing the Rock of Gibraltar on 1 April 1956, Bassett began several months of operations in the Mediterranean, making goodwill port visits and engaging in amphibious exercises. She ranged the length and breadth of the Mediterranean from Gibraltar to Athens, [reece, and İzmir, Turkey, and from the Isle of Rhodes to the French Riviera. In the course of her training evolutions, Bassett served as primary control ship for the landing practice at Porto Scudo, Sardinia, and Dikili, Turkey, in addition to supporting her own underwater demolition unit in each instance.

After the seven-month Mediterranean deployment, Bassett reached Little Creek on 18 October 1956 and spent the remainder of the year there engaged in upkeep and post-deployment repairs. In January 1957, she commenced local operations out of Little Creek in the Virginia Capes operating area. Later on, she extended the range of her operations from the immediate vicinity of Little Creek to as far away as La Guaira, Venezuela. Her other ports of call included the familiar ones of Guantanamo Bay and Vieques Island, as well as Coco Solo, Panama, and Morehead City, North Carolina.

Bassett reported to the Norfolk Group of the Atlantic Reserve Fleet on 26 August 1957 for inactivation.

== Final decommissioning and disposal ==
Bassett was decommissioned and placed in reserve at Norfolk on 26 November 1957. She remained in reserve for over nine and a half years before her name was stricken from the Navy List on 1 May 1967.

== Colombian Navy service ==
Towed from New York City to Boston, Massachusetts, early in July 1968, Bassett was turned over to Colombia under the Military Assistance Program. She was commissioned at Boston into the Colombian Navy as ARC Almirante Tono (DT 04) on 6 September 1968 and, after shakedown and post-shakedown repairs, sailed for the naval base at Cartagena, Colombia.

Almirante Tono operated with the Colombian Navy through the mid-1970s.
