= Polo Times =

Polo magazine

Polo Times is a magazine about polo.

== Overview ==
Polo Times was established in 1995 by Margaret Brett while she was working for the Hurlingham Polo Association. Starting as a small polo information sheet, over the course of twenty years Polo Times has grown to become a 100-page full colour magazine devoted to all aspects of polo, published ten times a year. It has become a leading magazine in the polo world. A website and email newsletters have both developed to keep polo players and enthusiasts constantly up to date with polo information. Margaret Brett also edited the magazine.

In 2013 Polo Times was sold to Nicholas Hine, a keen polo player of the Hine polo playing family and owner and managing director of Hine Marketing. Polo Times offices are located in Gloucestershire, UK.
