= USS Massey =

Allen M. Sumner-class destroyer

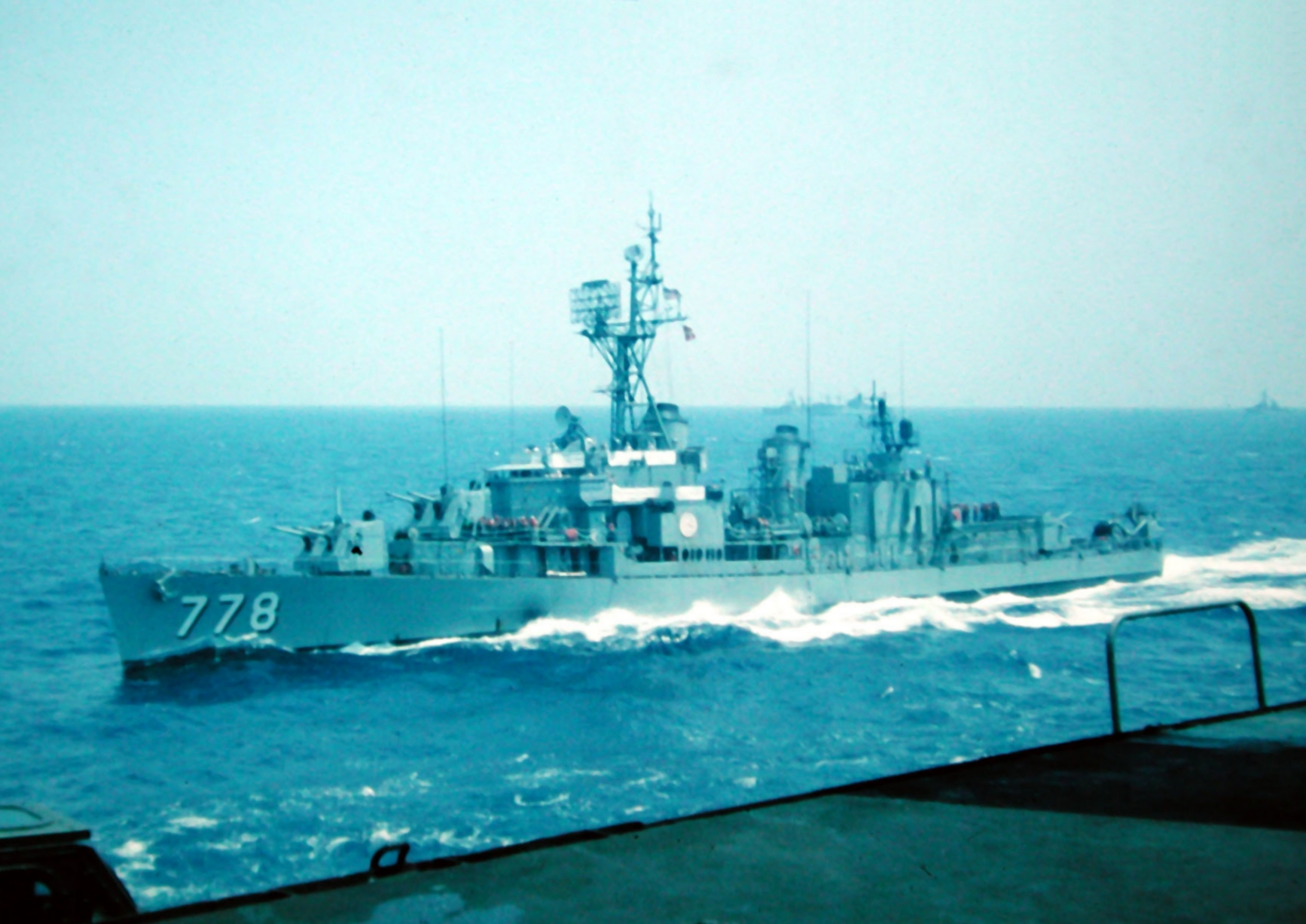
- USS Massey in 1971

History

United States
- Name: Massey
- Namesake: Lance Edward Massey
- Builder: Todd Pacific Shipyards, Seattle
- Laid down: 14 January 1944
- Launched: 12 September 1944
- Commissioned: 24 November 1944
- Decommissioned: c.1969
- Stricken: 17 September 1973
- Identification: NTSS (radio call sign)
- Fate: Sold 13 November 1974 and broken up for scrap

General characteristics
- Class & type: Allen M. Sumner-class destroyer
- Displacement: 2,200 tons
- Length: 376 ft 6 in (114.76 m)
- Beam: 40 ft (12 m)
- Draft: 15 ft 8 in (4.78 m)
- Propulsion: 60,000 shp (45,000 kW); 2 propellers
- Speed: 34 knots (63 km/h; 39 mph)
- Range: 6,500 nmi (12,000 km; 7,500 mi) at 15 kn (28 km/h; 17 mph)
- Complement: 336
- Armament: 6 × 5 in (127 mm)/38 cal. guns; 12 × 40 mm guns; 11 × 20 mm cannons; 10 × 21 inch (533 mm) torpedo tubes; 6 × depth charge tracks; 4 × depth charge projectors

USS Massey (DD-778), an Allen M. Sumner-class destroyer, was a United States Navy ship that served between 1944 and 1973.

== Construction ==
Massey (DD-778) was laid down on 14 January 1944 by Todd Pacific Shipyards, Inc., Seattle, Washington; and launched on 12 September 1944 and sponsored by Mrs. Marjorie Drake Massey, widow of Lieutenant Commander Lance E. Massey. The destroyer was commissioned on 24 November 1944, Commander Charles W. Aldrich in command.

== Namesake ==
Lance Edward "Lem" Massey was born on 20 September 1909 in Syracuse, New York, and was the only child of Walter Griffith Massey and Florence Lance Massey. Growing up in Watertown, New York, he attended two years of high school in Watertown, and then entered Severn School in Severna Park, Maryland, in 1925. After graduating from Severn in 1926, he was accepted into the U.S. Naval Academy when he was sixteen. After graduating from the Naval Academy in 1930, he was commissioned as an ensign, and he was ordered to the battleship USS Texas. After serving for a year aboard the Texas he entered flight training in Pensacola Naval Air Station in 1931 and earned his Naval Aviator wings in January 1932. He was assigned to Scouting Squadron 3 aboard the aircraft carrier USS Lexington for the next three years. He subsequently served a two-year tour at Pensacola Naval Air Station in Florida as a flight instructor. While at Pensacola, he married Marjorie Drake Kelsey, the widow of Lieutenant (j.g.) James Kelsey, a 1931 graduate of the US Naval Academy. In June 1937, Lieutenant (jg) Massey reported to Observation Squadron 3 aboard the battleship USS New Mexico, whose home port was Long Beach, California. In August 1937, he was promoted to lieutenant. In January 1940, Observation Squadron Three was transferred to the USS Idaho, where he stayed until July 1940, when he was sent to Naval Air Station, Pensacola. In October 1941, he was reassigned to the USS Enterprise as the Executive Officer of Torpedo Squadron 6 (VT-6), the post he held at the time the United States was attacked by Japan in December 1941.

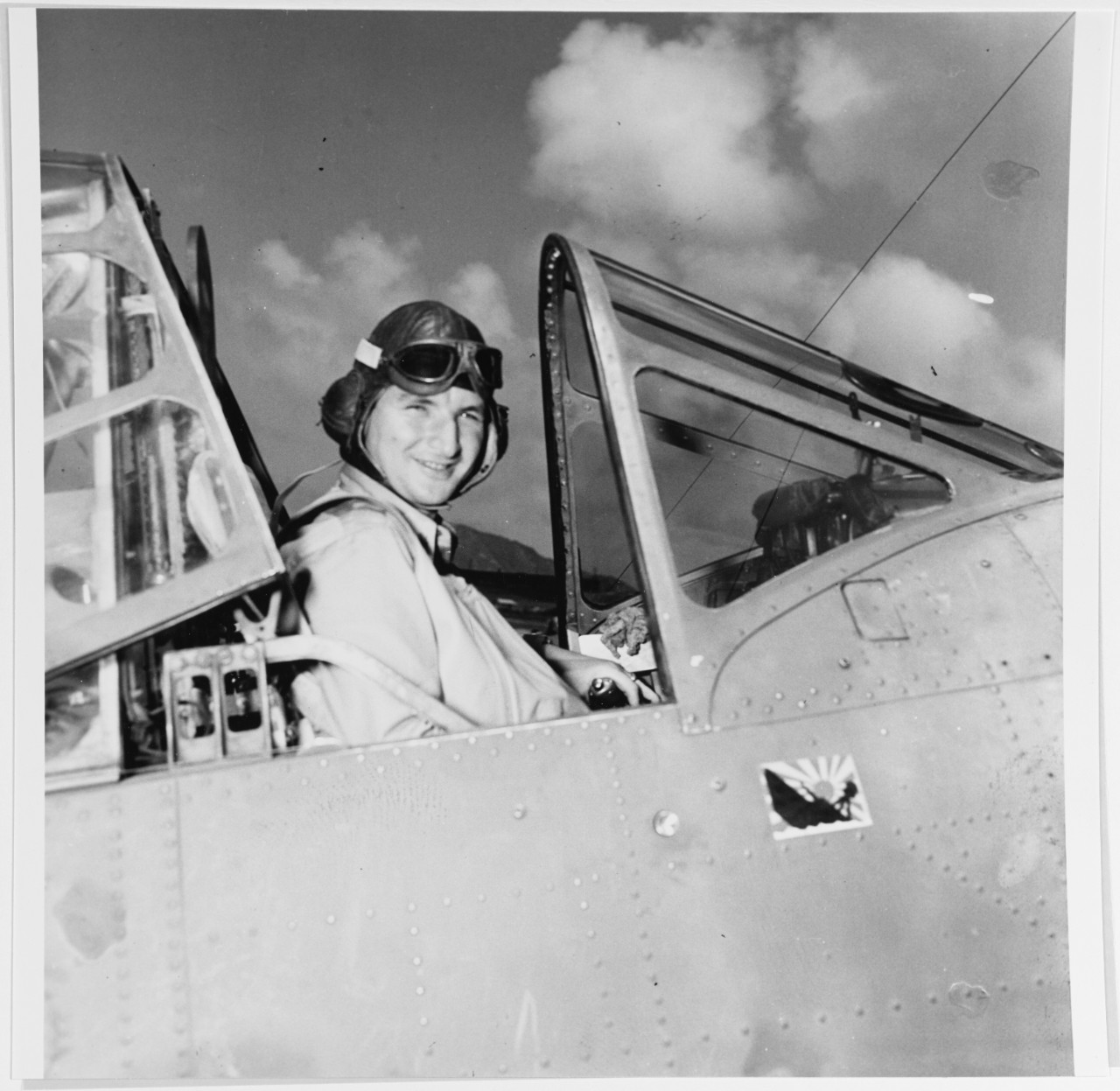
Lt Cdr Massey at NAS Ford Island on 24 May 1942. The victory flag marking on his Douglas TBD Devastator represents a Japanese ship he sank at Kwajalein during the Marshalls-Gilberts raids.

He was promoted to the rank of lieutenant commander in January 1942. His sole combat mission from Enterprise occurred on 1 February 1942, during the Marshalls-Gilberts raids, when he led VT-6's Second Division in the first airborne torpedo attack in U.S. Naval history. His nine TBD torpedo bombers attacked Japanese shipping at Kwajalein Atoll in the Marshall Islands, with Massey personally sinking the 18,000-ton Japanese transport Bordeaux Maru. For this action, he was awarded the Distinguished Flying Cross.

On 14 April 1942, he took command of Torpedo Squadron Three (VT-3), a USS Saratoga squadron then based at Kaneohe Naval Air Station. On 27 May 1942, VT-3 was transferred to USS Yorktown following the Battle of the Coral Sea, replacing that ship's own Torpedo Squadron 5 (VT-5). Yorktown sailed with VT-3 for Midway Island and entered Battle of Midway on 4 June 1942. Massey was killed while leading his squadron in a low-level attack against the Japanese aircraft carrier Hiryū. Despite being escorted by six F4F Wildcat fighters led by Lieutenant Commander John Thach, ten out of VT-3's twelve TBD's were lost. Massey was posthumously awarded the Navy Cross.

== History ==
=== World War II ===
Massey departed Bremerton, Washington, 13 February 1945 en route to her first war assignment. Screening escort carriers, she steamed to Tulagi for exercises in preparation for the Okinawa campaign. By 21 March she was at the Ulithi staging area and on 1 April she stood off Okinawa, protecting the escort carriers giving aerial support to the assault troops. For the next month she continued to operate with the carriers, switching to radar picket duty in May. Before leaving Okinawan waters on 24 June, Massey's guns had splashed nine kamikazes.

Massey then sailed to San Pedro Bay, Philippine Islands, returning to Okinawa on 16 July. She soon departed Buckner Bay to begin an antishipping sweep in the East China Sea, concentrating her efforts near the mouth of the Yangtze River. With the cessation of hostilities in mid‑August, the destroyer returned to Okinawa and was assigned to air‑sea rescue work until 22 September. She then served as courier ship between Wakayama and Yokosuka.

=== Korea ===
In December 1945, Massey departed for the United States, arriving at San Diego on 21 December. Reassigned to the Atlantic Fleet, she proceeded to the east coast, arriving in New York City on 16 January 1946. Until the outbreak of hostilities in Korea, 25 June 1950, Massey operated primarily in the Atlantic. Her assignments included midshipmen summer training cruises, her 1946 summer cruise being followed by an official visit to Chile, and hunter-killer team exercises for the Operational Development Force. Twice during this period, 21 July to 19 November 1947 and 1 June to 3 October 1948, she deployed with the 6th Fleet in the Mediterranean.

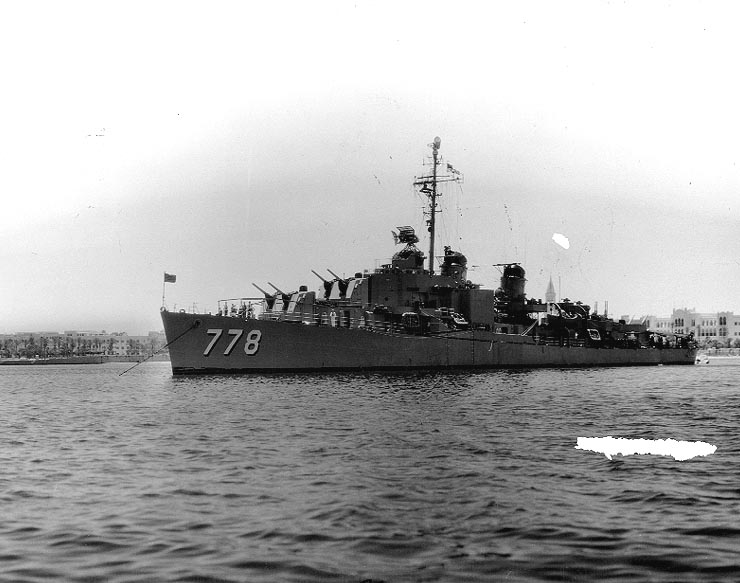
Massey at Tripoli, June 1948.

In September 1950, Massey was again ordered to the Pacific. She departed the east coast on 6 September and arrived in Yokosuka a month later. On 14 October she joined the Advance Force, United Nations Fleet, then engaged in minesweeping operations off the northeast coast of Korea. Massey patrolled the area in blockade and fire support activities, returning regularly to Wonsan, Hungnam, and Songjin, for most of her Korean tour. In December she bombarded enemy troop and transportation concentrations in the Hungnam area while U.N. forces were evacuating that port. She kept up her protective cover from 15 December through the completion of the operation on 24 December. She then turned her guns on the port facilities, thoroughly demolishing them.

In February 1951 the destroyer sailed to the west coast of Korea for blockade and bombardment in support of U.N. troops in the Inchon‑Seoul area. On 11 March she returned to the east coast and once again patrolled the North Korean coast, training her guns on enemy personnel and communications centers.

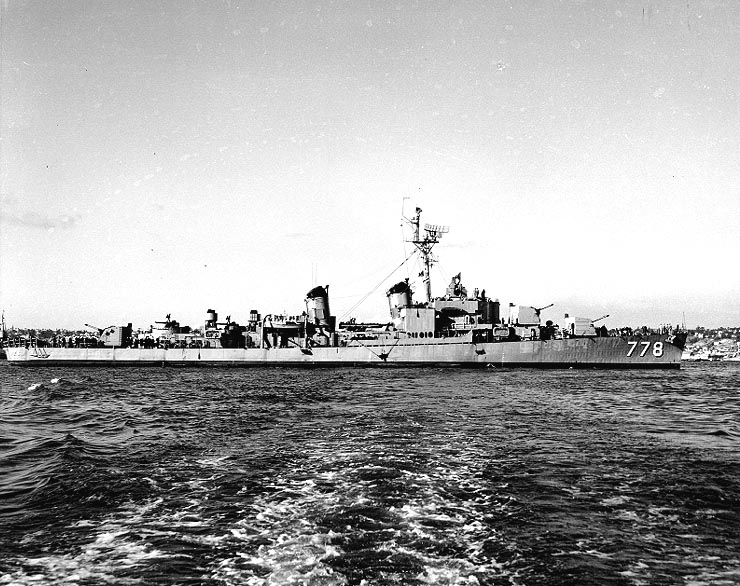
Massey in the early 1950s after being fitted with new radar antennas.

Massey returned to her home port, Norfolk, 2 July 1951 and resumed operations in the Atlantic. In April 1953 she departed for the Joint Antisubmarine School at Derry, Northern Ireland, and, following ASW operations with Royal Navy units, continued on to the Mediterranean for a 6‑month deployment with the 6th Fleet. During this deployment she joined the carrier Franklin D. Roosevelt in providing medical and material aid to earthquake victims on Cephalonia, one of the Greek Ionian Islands. She returned to the United States in October 1953 and was briefly assigned to Pensacola, Florida, for plane guard duties. She reentered Hampton Roads in time for Christmas and resumed antisubmarine activities.

Massey spent the next six years operating with the Atlantic Fleet. She conducted various exercises and type training off the east coast and in the Caribbean, and made annual deployments to the Mediterranean with the 6th Fleet and NATO forces. In 1957 she sailed to northern Europe and the North Sea for operations with NATO, in lieu of a Mediterranean cruise.

In December 1959, after 15 years of destroyer service, she entered the Norfolk Naval Shipyard where she underwent modernization (FRAM). Four years later, in April 1963, she put into Boston for further modernization, receiving this time a Drone Antisubmarine Helicopter deck. Following these yard periods she resumed her hunter-killer exercises in the Atlantic and the Mediterranean.

=== Vietnam ===
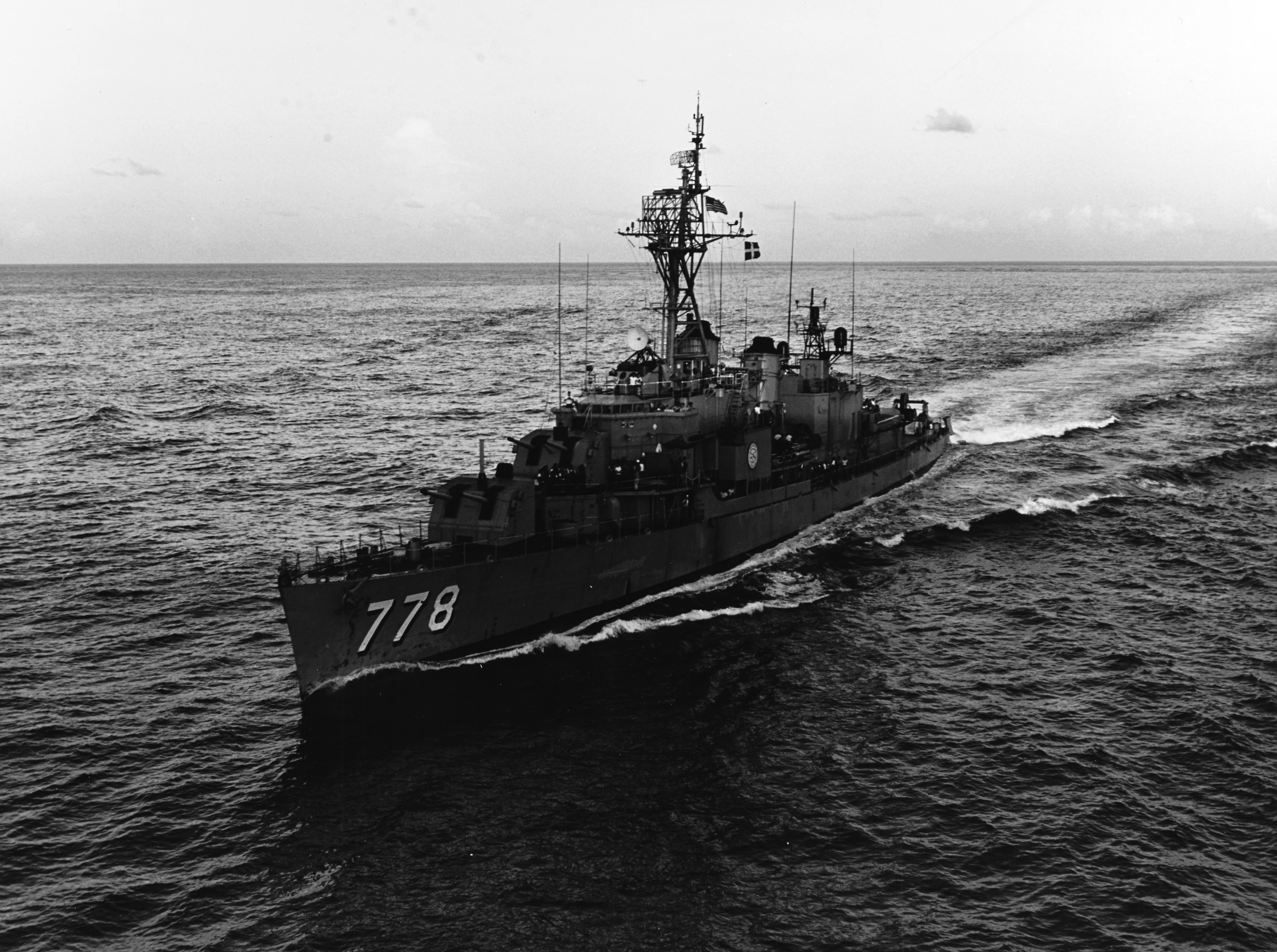
Massey coming alongside USS Kitty Hawk for underway refueling, during operations in the Western Pacific, 1966.

Massey was ordered to the Pacific for the second time, in January 1966. Departing Newport, Rhode Island, on 19 January, she transited the Panama Canal and headed into the Pacific. On 28 February she arrived at Kaohsiung, Taiwan, commencing operations in the South China Sea the following week. The destroyer cruised off the coast of Vietnam, providing gunfire support for ground forces and rescue service for carriers, as well as performing picket duty assignments, until departing Tonkin Gulf on 3 July 1966 for Subic Bay, Philippine Islands. From the Philippines, she steamed for home via the Suez Canal. She arrived at Newport, Rhode Island, on 17 August 1966, having circumnavigated the world. On 28 September she entered the Naval Shipyard at Boston for repairs.

Back in top shape early in 1967, Massey operated along the east coast and in the Caribbean, until departing Newport on 2 May for the Mediterranean. The destroyer reached Gibraltar on 11 May and operated with the 6th Fleet for the next four months. Steaming to the eastern Mediterranean she relieved destroyer Dyess in towing Atlantis to Rhodes after the sloop had been damaged in a collision with a merchant tanker.

=== USS Liberty incident ===
Arab-Israeli tensions had then become explosive. After fighting had erupted, word arrived 8 June that Israeli gunboats and aircraft had attacked and damaged technical research ship Liberty. Massey and Davis were ordered to steam toward the stricken ship at flank speed. En route doctors, corpsmen, and emergency medical supplies were transferred from the aircraft carrier America to the two destroyers. Early the next morning they went alongside Liberty to render aid. That afternoon, as Davis accompanied Liberty to Malta, Massey screened America as TG 60.1 steamed through the troubled waters of the eastern Mediterranean.

As the situation in the Middle East eased, the destroyer steamed to Crete, arriving in Suda Bay on 15 June. Massey continued operations with the 6th Fleet until departing Rota, Spain, 12 September for home, arriving in Newport on 21 September 1967.
