= Lance Edward Massey =

Recipient of the Navy Cross

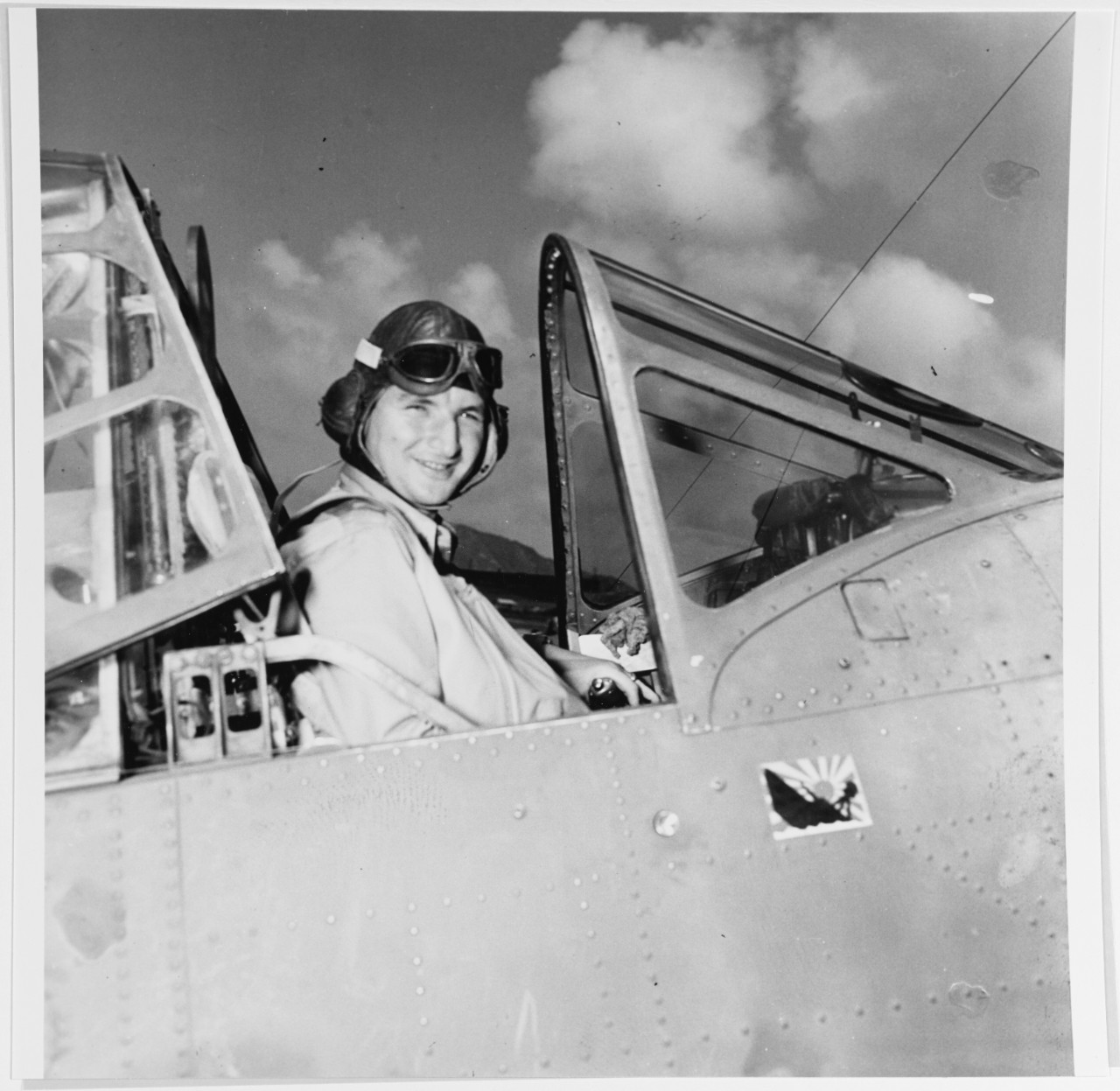
- Lt Cdr Massey at NAS Ford Island on 24 May 1942. The victory flag marking on his TBD Devastator represents a Japanese ship he sank at Kwajalein during the Marshalls-Gilberts raids.
- Born: September 20, 1909; Syracuse, New York, United States
- Died: June 4, 1942 (aged 32)
- Military career
- Branch: United States Navy
- Rank: Lieutenant commander
- Commands: Torpedo Squadron 3 (VT-3)
- Conflicts: World War II: Marshalls-Gilberts raids; Battle of Midway
- Awards: Navy Cross; Distinguished Flying Cross; Purple Heart

Lance Edward "Lem" Massey (20 September 1909 – 4 June 1942) was a U.S. Navy pilot during World War II.

== Early life ==
He was born in Syracuse, New York, the only child of Walter Griffith Massey and Florence Lance Massey. Growing up in Watertown, New York, he attended two years of high school in Watertown, and then entered Severn School in Severna Park, Maryland, in 1925. After graduating from Severn in 1926, he was accepted into the U.S. Naval Academy when he was sixteen.

== Military career ==
After graduating from the Naval Academy in 1930, he was given his commission as an ensign. One of his classmates was Dudley W. Morton. His first assignment was the battleship USS Texas (BB-35). After serving for a year aboard the Texas he entered flight training at Naval Air Station Pensacola in 1931 and was awarded Naval Aviator wings in January 1932. He was assigned to Scouting Squadron 3 aboard the aircraft carrier USS Lexington (CV-2) for the next three years. He subsequently served a two-year tour at Pensacola Naval Air Station in Florida as a flight instructor. While at Pensacola, he married Marjorie Drake Kelsey, the widow of Lieutenant (j.g.) James Kelsey. In June 1937, Lieutenant (jg) Massey reported to Observation Squadron 3 aboard the battleship USS New Mexico (BB-40). In August 1937, he was promoted to lieutenant. In January 1940, Observation Squadron Three was transferred to the USS Idaho (BB-42), where he stayed until July 1940, when he returned to Naval Air Station Pensacola. In October 1941, he was reassigned to the USS Enterprise (CV-6) as the Executive Officer of Torpedo Squadron 6 (VT-6), the post he held at the time the United States was attacked by Japan in December 1941.

He was promoted to the rank of lieutenant commander in January 1942. His sole combat mission from Enterprise occurred on 1 February 1942, during the Marshalls-Gilberts raids, when he led VT-3's Second Division in the first airborne torpedo attack in U.S. naval history. His nine Douglas TBD Devastator torpedo bombers attacked Japanese shipping at Kwajalein Atoll in the Marshall Islands, with Massey personally sinking the 18,000-ton Japanese transport Bordeaux Maru. For this action, he was awarded the Distinguished Flying Cross.

=== Midway ===
On 14 April 1942, he took command of Torpedo Squadron Three (VT-3) aboard USS Saratoga (CV-3), then based at Kaneohe Naval Air Station. On 27 May 1942, VT-3 was transferred to USS Yorktown (CV-5) following the Battle of the Coral Sea, replacing that ship's own Torpedo Squadron 5 (VT-5). Yorktown sailed with VT-3 for Midway Island and entered battle on 4 June 1942. During this crucial encounter, Massey was killed while leading his squadron in a low-level attack against the Japanese aircraft carrier Hiryū. He was last seen

"stood up in his open cockpit, with one foot on the stub wing and the other on the seat, as his TBD [Devastator] dropped toward the water 250 feet below. The skipper did not have the altitude to survive the jump from his flaming wreck."

Escorted by only six F4F Wildcat fighters, led by Lieutenant Commander John Thach, ten out of VT-3's twelve TBD's were lost. For his heroism in pursuing the attack on Hiryu, Massey was posthumously awarded the Navy Cross.

In addition to his widow Marjorie, he was survived by two sons, CDR Lance Bradford Massey (USN, Ret.) and Walter Drake Massey.

== Awards and honors ==
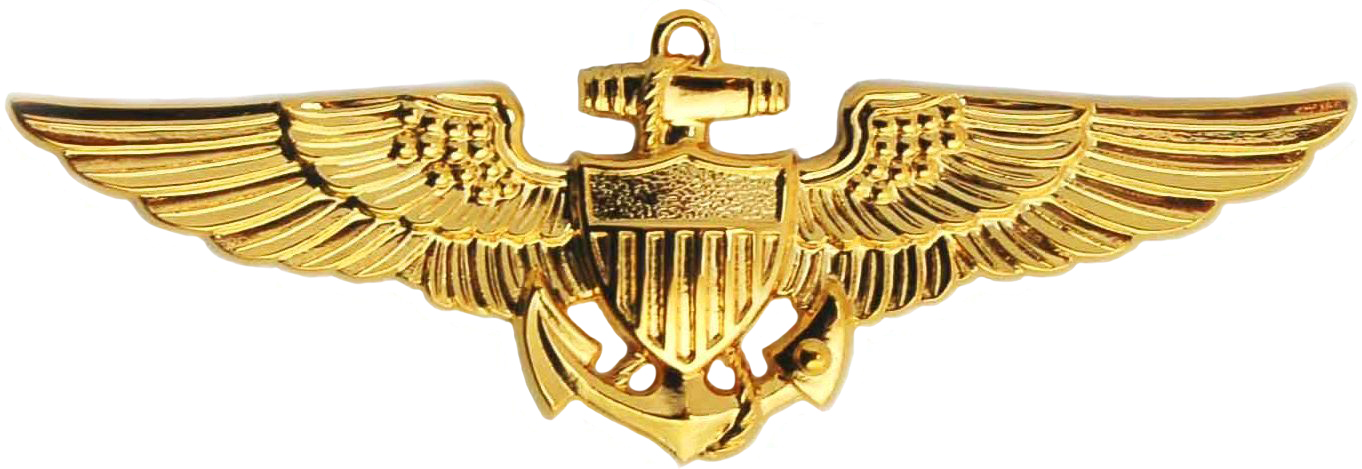

Naval Aviator Badge
Navy Cross		Distinguished Flying Cross
Purple Heart	Navy Presidential Unit Citation	American Defense Service Medal w/ Fleet clasp
American Campaign Medal	Asiatic-Pacific Campaign Medal w/ three 3/16" bronze stars	World War II Victory Medal

=== Navy Cross citation ===

Lieutenant Commander Lance Edward Massey
U.S. Navy
Date Of Action: June 4, 1942

The President of the United States of America takes pride in presenting the Navy Cross (Posthumously) to Lieutenant Commander Lance Edward Massey, United States Navy, for extraordinary heroism in operations against the enemy while serving as Pilot of a carrier-based Navy Torpedo Plane and Commanding Officer of Torpedo Squadron THREE (VT-3), attached to the USS Yorktown (CV-5), during the “Air Battle of Midway,” against enemy Japanese forces on 4 June 1942. Lieutenant Massey led his squadron in a Torpedo Plane assault against Japanese naval units, in the face of intense anti-aircraft fire and overwhelming fighter opposition. He pressed home his attack to a point where it became relatively certain that in order to fulfill his mission he would probably sacrifice his life. Undeterred by the grave possibilities of such a hazardous offensive, he carried on, with extreme disregard for his own personal safety, until his squadron scored direct hits on two enemy aircraft carriers. His self sacrificing gallantry and fortitude were in keeping with the highest traditions of the United States Naval Service. He gallantly gave his life for his country.

In memory of his actions at the Battle of Midway, the U.S. Navy commissioned the Allen M. Sumner-class destroyer USS Massey (DD-778) on 24 November 1944.

== In popular culture ==
- Massey was depicted in the 1976 war film Midway by actor Steve Kanaly.
