= USS Powers =

USS Powers may refer to more than one United States Navy ship:

- USS John J. Powers (DE-528), a destroyer escort in commission from 1944 to 1945
- USS Oswald A. Powers (DE-542), a destroyer escort cancelled in 1946
