= USS Osberg =

John C. Butler-class destroyer escort of the United States Navy

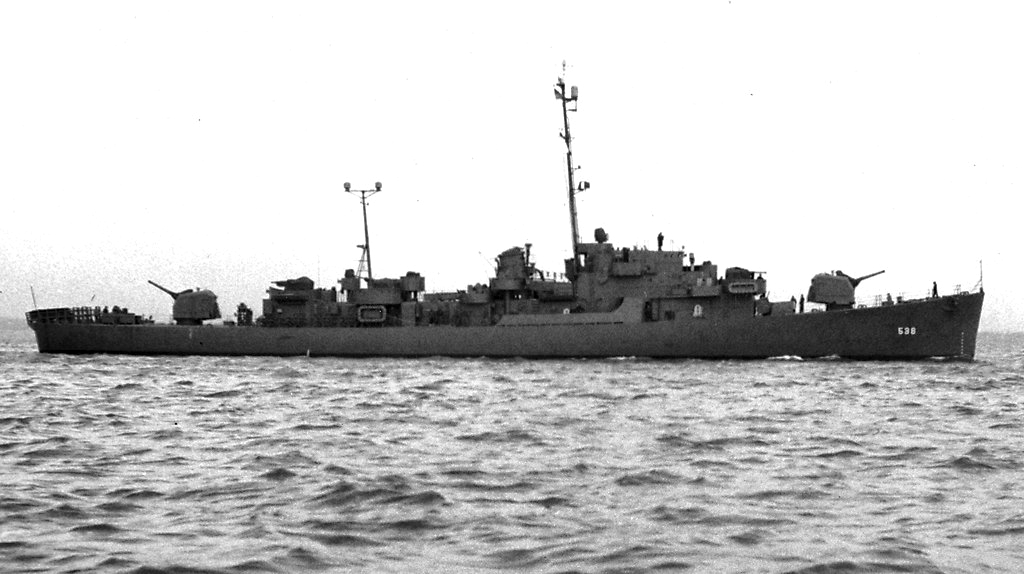

History

United States
- Laid down: 3 November 1943
- Launched: 7 December 1943
- Commissioned: 10 December 1945
- Decommissioned: 1947
- In service: 26 February 1951
- Out of service: 25 February 1958
- Stricken: 1 August 1972
- Fate: Sold for scrapping 5 February 1974

General characteristics
- Displacement: 1,350 long tons (1,372 t)
- Length: 306 ft (93 m) (oa)
- Beam: 36 ft 10 in (11.23 m)
- Draft: 13 ft 4 in (4.06 m) (max)
- Propulsion: 2 boilers, 2 geared steam turbines, 12,000 shp, 2 screws
- Speed: 24 knots
- Range: 6,000 nm @ 12 knots
- Complement: 14 officers, 201 enlisted
- Armament: 2 × 5"/38 guns, 4 (2×2) 40 mm anti-aircraft (AA) guns, 10 × 20 mm AA guns, 3 × 21 inch (533 mm) torpedo tubes, 1 × Hedgehog, 8 × depth charge throwers, 2 × depth charge tracks

USS Osberg (DE-538) was a John C. Butler-class destroyer escort in service with the United States Navy from 1945 to 1947 and from 1951 to 1958. She sold for scrapping in 1974.

== Namesake ==
Carl August Osberg was born on 13 April 1920 in Dunbarton, New Hampshire. He attended Manchester Central High School, where he played football. In his free time he observed bi-planes at Grenier Field, site of today's Manchester–Boston Regional Airport. He quit college at Cornell to join the Navy reserves and was trained at Naval Air Station Squantum in Massachusetts. He was one of the twelve pilots of Torpedo Squadron 3 attached to the aircraft carrier USS Yorktown. During the Battle of Midway on 4 June 1942, his squadron attacked Imperial Japanese Navy ships and he went missing. He was posthumously awarded the Navy Cross.

== History ==
Osberg was commissioned on 10 December 1945 and was decommissioned on 15 May 1947. She was recommissioned for duty during the Korean War on 26 February 1951. She operated in the Atlantic Ocean until her second decommissioning on 25 February 1958. She was struck from the Navy list on 1 August 1972, and, on 5 February 1974 she was sold for scrapping.
