= Henderson Field (East Midway) =

Former World War II airfield in the Central Pacific

Henderson Field (Midway) Naval Air Station Midway Islands
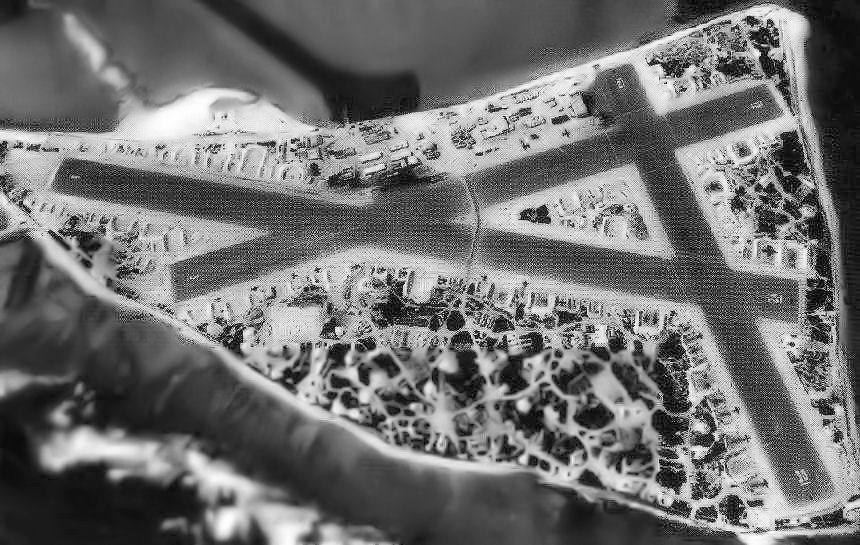

Site information
- Type: Military airfield
- Controlled by: United States Navy; United States Army Air Forces

Location
- Coordinates: 28°12′39.78″N 177°19′43.00″W

Site history
- Built: 1941
- In use: 1941-1945

Henderson Field (originally known as Naval Air Station Midway Islands) on East Midway Island is a former World War II airfield in the Central Pacific. The airfield was abandoned after the war.

== History ==
See Also: Battle of Midway, Henderson Field (Midway Atoll), Lofton R. Henderson

The Midway Islands are best known as the location of the pivotal battle of the Pacific Theatre of World War II. Henderson Field was built in 1941. It consisted of a seaplane facility on Sand Island and a landplane airfield on Eastern Island. The Eastern Island airfield initially comprised three runways, 2 hangars & a barracks.

Midway was shelled by a Japanese destroyer on the same day as the Pearl Harbor attack, and was shelled by a submarine several months later.

During the climactic Battle of Midway in 1942, the Japanese were so sure of their victory that they deliberately spared the runways of Eastern Island for their use after the capture of the island. That didn't happen, due to their overwhelming defeat in the waters surrounding Midway.

Aircraft of the Navy, Marine Corps & Army operated from Eastern Island, and helped to turn back the Japanese Fleet. The Marine Corps had nineteen SBD-2 Dauntless dive-bombers, seven F4F-3 Wildcat, seventeen SB2U-3 Vindicators, twenty-one F2A-3 Brewster Buffalos and six TBF-1 Avenger torpedo-bombers.

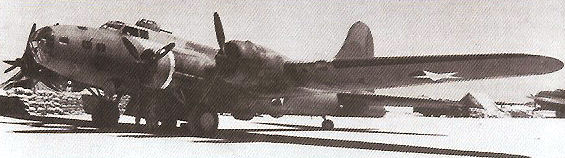
B-17E of the 72d Bomb Squadron, 5th Bomb Group which took part in the Battle of Midway, 1942

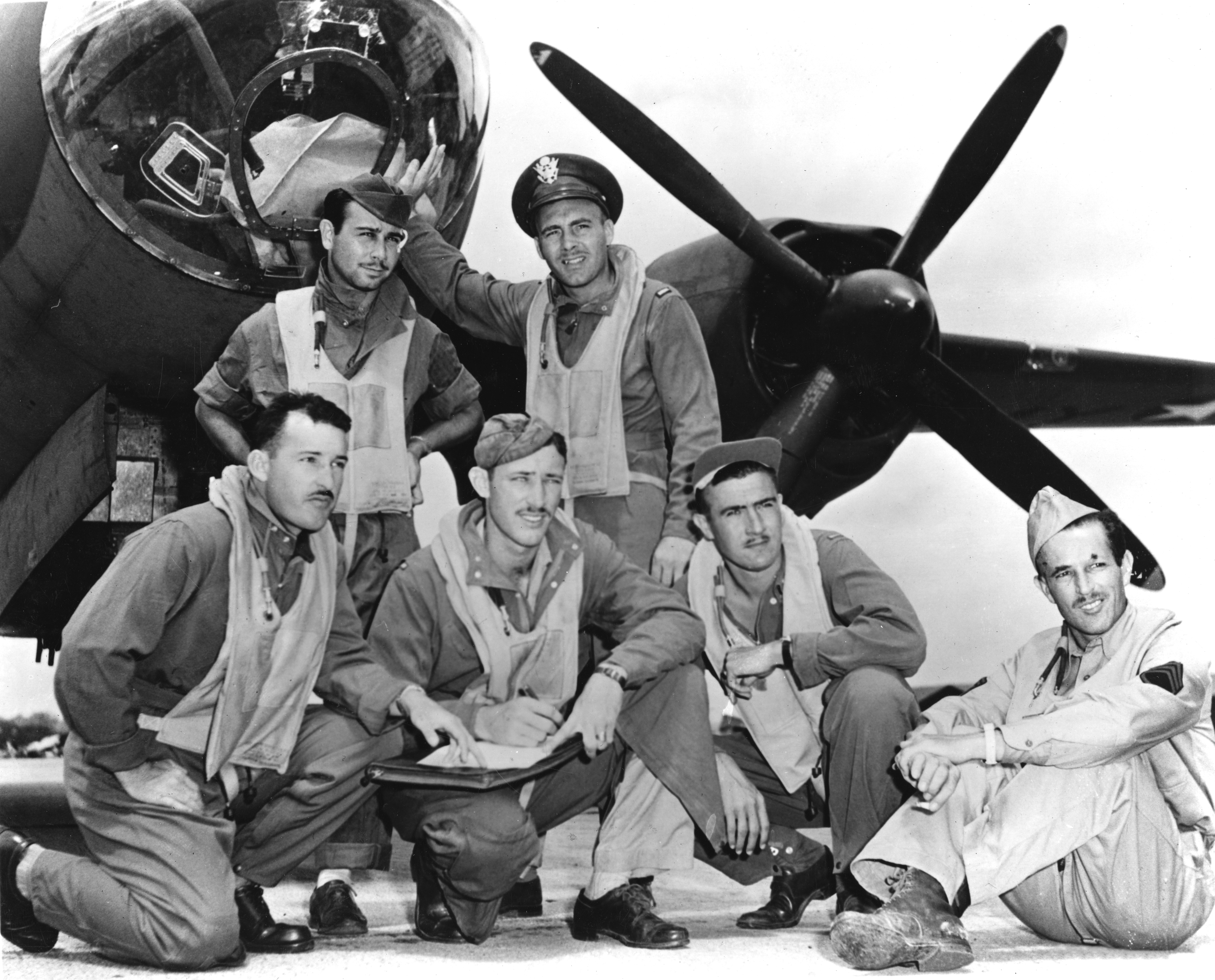
First Lieutenant James Muri's aircrew and its USAAF B-26A which made torpedo-attack on Nagumo's carriers in early morning 4 June during the Battle of Midway, June 1942. 1st. Lt. Muri is second from left, in the front row.

Eight Boeing B-17E Flying Fortresses of the 431st Bombardment Squadron (11th Bombardment Group) were deployed to Midway on 29 May 1942 and were joined by nine more the next day from the 42d Bombardment Squadron along with five Martin B-26 Marauders (three from the 19th Bombardment Squadron (22d Bombardment Group) that were in Hawaii and two from the 69th Bombardment Squadron (38th Bombardment Group)). The Marauders were equipped to drop torpedoes and were under the command of Admiral Chester W. Nimitz, Commander in Chief, Pacific. In addition, B-17Es of the 3d and 72d Bombardment Squadrons (5th Bombardment Group) were sent to Midway in preparation for the battle.

No aircraft based on Midway scored any hits on enemy ships during the battle.

Because of the threat of a dawn attack on Midway, searching planes were sent out as early as possible each day - usually about 04:15. To safeguard them from destruction on the ground and to have the striking force instantly available, the B-17's took off immediately afterwards. They remained in the air for about 4 hours, by which time the progress of the search and the reduction of their fuel load made it safe for them to land. The four B-26's, the six TBF's, and other planes remained on the ground but fully alert until the search had reached a distance of 400 miles (640 km).

Nimitz believed that the enemy planned a rendezvous about 700 miles (1,100 km) west of Midway and ordered that this area be searched by B-17's on 31 May and 1 June, if possible. This was done with negative results. On 2 June a B-17 without bombs searched 800 miles (1,300 km) to the west without making any contacts. These searches were conducted in part by two groups of six B-17's flown in from Hawaii on 30 and 31 May, respectively. Consequently, their crews were in the air about 30 hours in the 2 days before actual combat, and, in addition, serviced their own planes.

On 3 June the usual search was made. At 12:30 9 B-17Es left Midway in search of the Japanese invasion fleet, which had been sighted by a PBY an hour earlier only 700 miles (1,100 km) away, and was ordered to attack this "main body." This Japanese force, consisting of 2 or 3 heavy cruisers and about 30 other ships, including destroyers, transports, and cargo vessels, had evidently been moving toward Midway since the morning contact. At 16:25 the fleet of 26 ships was spotted 570 miles (920 km) from the island. Six B-17Es of the 431st, along with three B-17Es from the 31st, attacked in three flights of three from altitudes of 8,000 feet (2,400 m), 10,000 feet (3,000 m), and 12,000 feet (3,700 m) respectively.

On the night of 3 June, an additional seven B-17Es from the 42d Bomb Squadron arrived on Midway to reinforce the heavy bomber contingent. At 04:15, 14 B-17s left Midway shortly after the patrol planes had been sent out. They were proceeding to the west to attack the enemy forces sighted the preceding day when a message was received in plain language telling of the discovery of the enemy carrier task force on bearing 325° from Midway. Climbing to 20,000 feet (6,100 m), the Fortresses changed course to find the carriers. The enemy force was located at 07:32, but the carriers, circling under a cloud formation, were not found until 08:10. The B-17's had skirted the fleet and approached from the northwest; i. e., from the stern of the targets. They attacked by flights, two elements concentrating on each of two carriers and a single element on a third. Antiaircraft fire was heavy and found the altitude, but was generally behind. The Japanese fighters did not dare press home their attacks, which were ineffectual.

In addition to the B-17 attacks, at 07:05 the B-26's attacked through heavy fighter defense and flak with no fighter support of their own. The Marauders were equipped with external torpedo racks underneath the keel of the aircraft. The torpedo runs began at 800 feet (240 m) altitude, the B-26s then dropping down to only 10 feet (3.0 m) above the water under heavy attack from Japanese fighters. Two of the Marauders were lost in this action, and the other two were heavily damaged. No hits were made on the Japanese carriers. The B-26 was much too large an aircraft for this type of attack.

A second group of eight B-17Es launched from Midway on 5 June attacked a Japanese task force 130 miles (210 km) from the island and claimed hits on two large warships. A third group of six B-17s claimed hits on a heavy cruiser 300 miles (480 km) from Midway. The last strike made by Seventh Air Force aircraft in the Battle of Midway was by five B-17Es attacking a heavy cruiser 425 miles (684 km) from Midway, in which one B-17 was shot down, although all of the crew but one was rescued. Another B-17 was lost due to running out of fuel.

Between 3 and 5 June, Fifth Air Force B-17s flew 16 attacks totaling 55 sorties from Midway. However, eventually it was determined that none of the heavy bombers actually hit a target. The B-17's were far more suited to high altitude bombing, hitting stationary ground targets, not maritime bombing, attempting to hit moving targets.

=== After the battle ===
After the Battle of Midway, the airfield on Sand Island was named in honor of Major Lofton R. Henderson, who perished in the battle. The airfield on Eastern Island was abandoned after the war. The P-40 Warhawk-equipped 73rd Fighter Squadron (18th Fighter Group) was assigned to Henderson Field after the battle to provide air defense. It remained until January 1943 when it returned to Hawaii.

=== Henderson Field today ===
Eastern Island has been abandoned since 1970. Today, the original runways, bunkers and other wartime remnants still stand. Bomb craters and long strings of strafing bullet marks from Japanese Zero fighter aircraft still stitch across runway aprons and building faces, evidence that Japan brought the battle onto Midway's shores.

No buildings remain on Eastern Island. Verbesina encelioides (Golden crownbeard flower) has about taken over all of it. The runways, although declared a National Historic Treasure, are not maintained. The only building on Eastern Island is an outdoor john built by Fish and Wildlife Service. The seawalls have been taken down, allowing for substantial erosion. The island is desolate with no trees.

== See also ==
- USAAF in the Central Pacific
