= USS Oswald A. Powers =

United States Navy John C. Butler-class destroyer escort

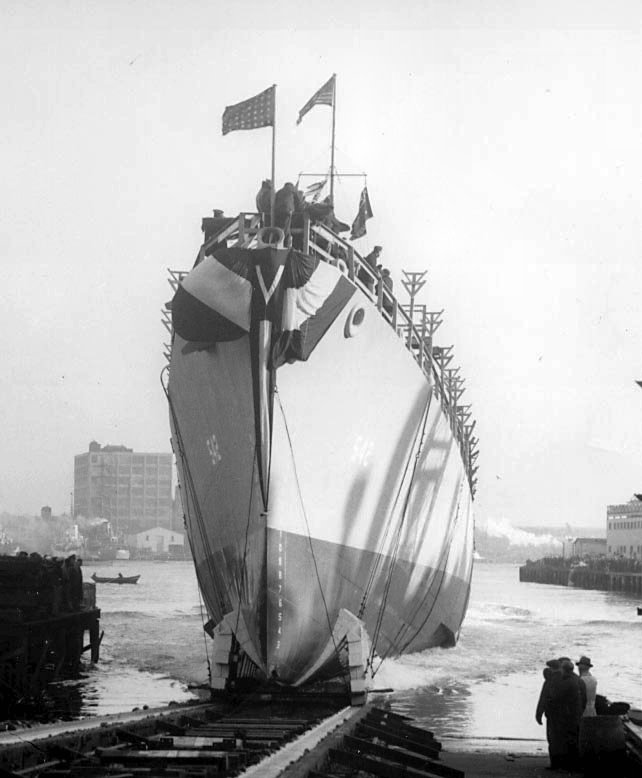
- USS Oswald A. Powers is launched at Boston Navy Yard, Boston, Massachusetts, on 17 December 1943.

History

United States
- Name: USS Oswald A. Powers
- Namesake: Ensign Oswald A. Powers (1915-1942), U.S. Navy officer and Navy Cross recipient
- Builder: Boston Navy Yard, Boston, Massachusetts
- Laid down: 18 November 1943
- Launched: 17 December 1943
- Sponsored by: Mrs. Ella M. Powers
- Completed: Never
- Commissioned: Never
- Fate: Construction contract cancelled 7 January 1946; sold for scrap incomplete 17 June 1947

General characteristics
- Class & type: John C. Butler-class destroyer escort
- Displacement: 1,350 tons
- Length: 306 ft (93 m)
- Beam: 36 ft 8 in (11 m)
- Draft: 9 ft 5 in (3 m)
- Propulsion: 2 boilers, 2 geared turbine engines, 12,000 shp; 2 propellers
- Speed: 24 knots (44 km/h)
- Range: 6,000 nmi. (12,000 km) @ 12 kt
- Complement: 14 officers, 201 enlisted
- Armament: 2 × single 5 in (127 mm) guns; 2 × twin 40 mm (1.6 in) AA guns; 10 × single 20 mm (0.79 in) AA guns; 1 × triple 21 in (533 mm) torpedo tubes; 8 × depth charge throwers; 1 × Hedgehog ASW mortar; 2 × depth charge racks

USS Oswald A. Powers (DE-542) was a United States Navy John C. Butler-class destroyer escort launched during World War II but never completed.

== Namesake ==
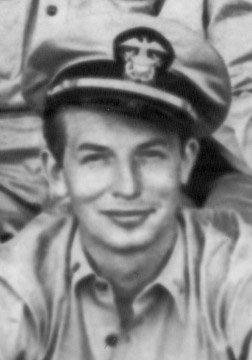
Oswald A. Powers at Naval Air Station Kaneohe Bay on 29 May 1942, six days before his death in action during the Battle of Midway.

Oswald Aaron Powers was born on 25 November 1915 in Marine City, Michigan. He enlisted in the United States Naval Reserve as a seaman 2nd class, V-5, USNR, on 6 November 1940 at the United States Naval Reserve Aviation Base Grosse Ile, Michigan, and was placed on inactive duty that same day. Appointed aviation cadet, USNR, on 5 February 1941, to rank from 1 February 1941, he was transferred to Naval Air Station Pensacola on 6 February 1941, and was issued a good discharge as a seaman 2nd class on 9 February 1941 to accept his appointment as aviation cadet.

Reporting to Naval Air Station Pensacola on 10 February 1941, Powers was appointed a "naval aviator (heavier than air)" on 12 August 1941. On 5 September 1941, he was promoted to ensign, A-V(N), USNR. Five days later, on 10 September 1941, Ensign Powers was detached from NAS Miami and was transferred to the Advanced Carrier Training Group, United States Pacific Fleet, at Naval Air Station San Diego in San Diego, California, reporting on 3 October 1941. Detached from Naval Air Station San Diego on 4 November 1941, he reported to Torpedo Squadron 3 (VT-3), based aboard the aircraft carrier USS Saratoga on 5 November 1941. After an Imperial Japanese Navy submarine torpedoed Saratoga on 11 January 1942 VT-3 was based ashore, first at Naval Air Station Pearl Harbor on Ford Island in Pearl Harbor, then at Naval Air Station Kaneohe Bay, Hawaii, whence the squadron trained and continued to stand alerts.

On 30 May 1942, assigned to the air group of aircraft carrier USS Yorktown, replacing Torpedo Squadron 5 (VT-5) aboard Yorktown, VT-3 flew aboard as Yorktown departed Pearl Harbor to participate in the Battle of Midway. On 4 June 1942, Yorktown launched VT-3 and Bombing Squadron 3 (VB-3), covered by fighters from Fighting Squadron 3 (VF-3), to attack the Japanese aircraft carrier force in concert with a strike from aircraft carriers USS Enterprise and USS Hornet. Circumstances, however, dictated that only the Yorktown Air Group attacked as a unit, with VT-3 the last of the three American carrier torpedo squadrons to execute attacks against the Japanese carriers. Japanese Mitsubishi A6M2 Type 00 carrier fighters, however, overwhelmed the six-plane VF-3 covering element, and, in concert with heavy antiaircraft fire from the Japanese carriers and their screening ships, shot down ten of the twelve VT-3's Douglas TBD Devastator torpedo bombers participating in the raid. Powers and his radio gunner, Seaman 2nd Class Joseph E. Mandeville, perished in the attack. He was posthumously awarded the Navy Cross.

== Construction ==
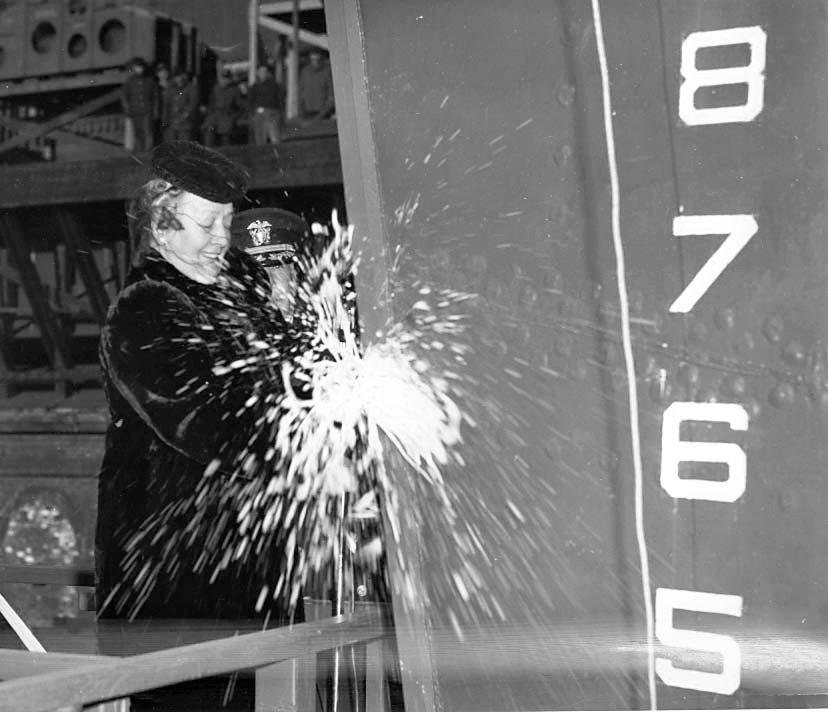
Mrs. Ella M. Powers christens USS Oswald A. Powers at Oswald A. Powers's launching on 17 December 1943 at Boston Navy Yard, Boston, Massachusetts.

The name Oswald A. Powers was assigned to DE–542 on 28 September 1943. Oswald A. Powers was laid down at the Boston Navy Yard at Boston, Massachusetts, on 18 November 1943 and launched on 17 December 1943, sponsored by Mrs. Ella M. Powers, mother of Ensign Oswald A. Powers, the ship's namesake.

Construction of Oswald A. Powers was suspended before she could be completed. On 30 August 1945, she was assigned to the Atlantic Inactive Fleet in an incomplete state. On 7 January 1946, the contract for her construction was cancelled, and the incomplete ship was sold on 17 June 1947 to the John J. Duane Company of Quincy, Massachusetts, for scrapping.
