= VA-35 (U.S. Navy) =

Attack Squadron 35
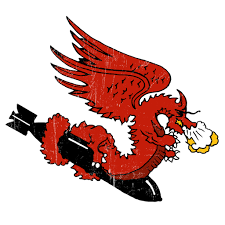
- VA-35 squadron patch
- Active: 6 July 1925 - 7 November 1949
- Country: United States
- Branch: United States Navy
- Nickname: Dragons
- Engagements: World War II

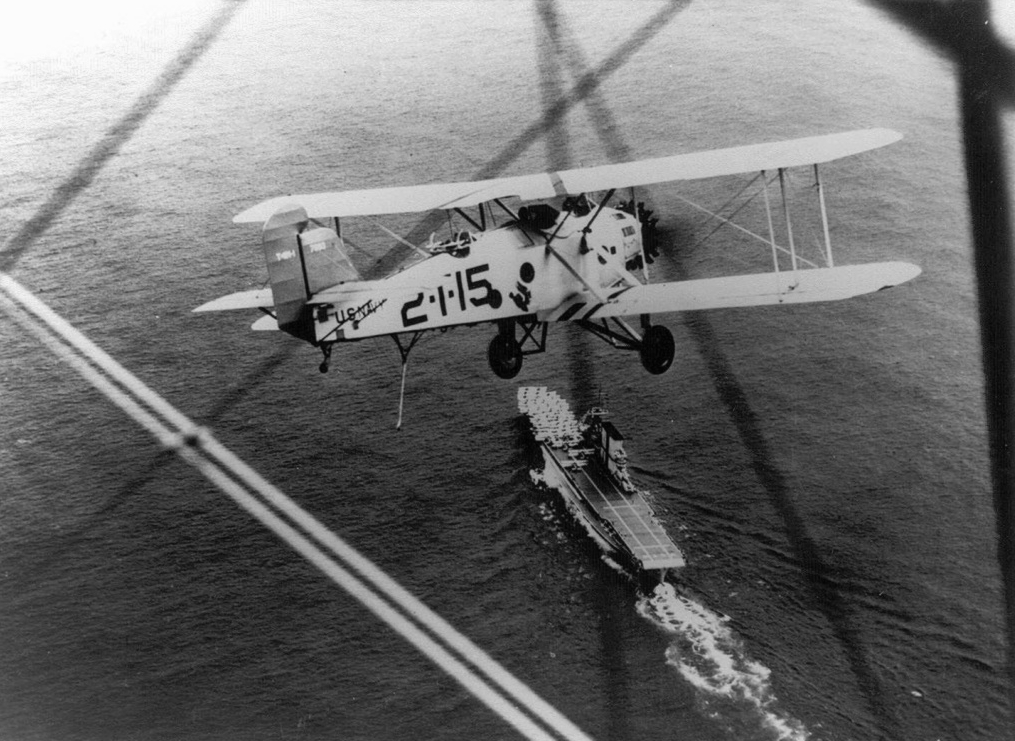
A VT-2B Martin T4M-1 flying over the USS Saratoga in 1929. Note the squadron's dragon insignia on the fuselage just aft of the lower wing

Attack Squadron 35 (VA-35) was an aviation unit of the United States Navy. The squadron's nickname is unknown. Its insignia, a winged dragon, was revised several times during its lifetime. The squadron was first established as Torpedo and Bombing Squadron 2 (VT-2) on 6 July 1925, and was redesignated as VT-2B on 1 July 1927, VT-3 on 1 July 1937, VA-4A on 15 November 1946, and, finally, VA-35 on 7 August 1948. The squadron was disestablished on 7 November 1949. It was the first squadron to carry the VA-35 designation, the second VA-35 was redesignated from VA-34 on 15 February 1950 and disestablished on 31 January 1995.

Note: There is a Second VA-35 (U.S. Navy)

== Operational history ==
- 6 July 1925: VT-2 was established on board USS Aroostook at Pearl Harbor. Aroostook had been a minelayer that was refitted as an aircraft tender but continued to carry the CM minelayer designation.
- August 1926: The squadron was engaged in experimental work relating to the use of signal lights as a means of communicating between aircraft and ships.
- 1928: With the arrival of the T3M-2 aircraft, the squadron began the transition from water based aircraft to land planes. The squadron continued its aircraft transition from T3M-2s, which were difficult to land on the carrier, to T4M-1s. The primary mission of the T4M-1s was bombing, although they could be used for torpedo work and laying smoke screens.
- January–February 1929: Fleet Problem IX was the first time the Navy's two large carriers, USS Saratoga (with VT-2B embarked) and USS Lexington, participated in a major fleet exercise.
- March–April 1930: In March the squadron participated in Fleet Problem X which was conducted in the Caribbean Sea, followed by the Fleet Problem XI in April.
- May 1930: VT-2B's aircraft joined with the planes from 9 other squadrons, which included the USS Saratoga, USS Lexington, and USS Langley Air Groups, for a three-day tour of east coast cities from Norfolk, Virginia to Boston. The flight was commanded by Captain Kenneth Whiting and consisted of 36 torpedo and bombing planes, 57 fighting planes, 24 scouting planes, 3 amphibian utility planes, 3 Ford trimotor transports and 2 staff planes. It was the largest air parade that had ever been assembled on the east coast.
- 1931–1934: The squadron participated in Fleet Problems XII through XV.
- 31 May 1934: A Fleet Review for President Franklin D. Roosevelt was held in New York Harbor.
- 1935–1938: The squadron participated in Fleet Problems XVI through XIX.
- May 1937: VT-2B participated in the celebration marking the opening of the Golden Gate Bridge.
- April–May 1940: The squadron participated in Fleet Problem XXI. This was the last major Fleet Problem conducted before America's involvement in World War II.

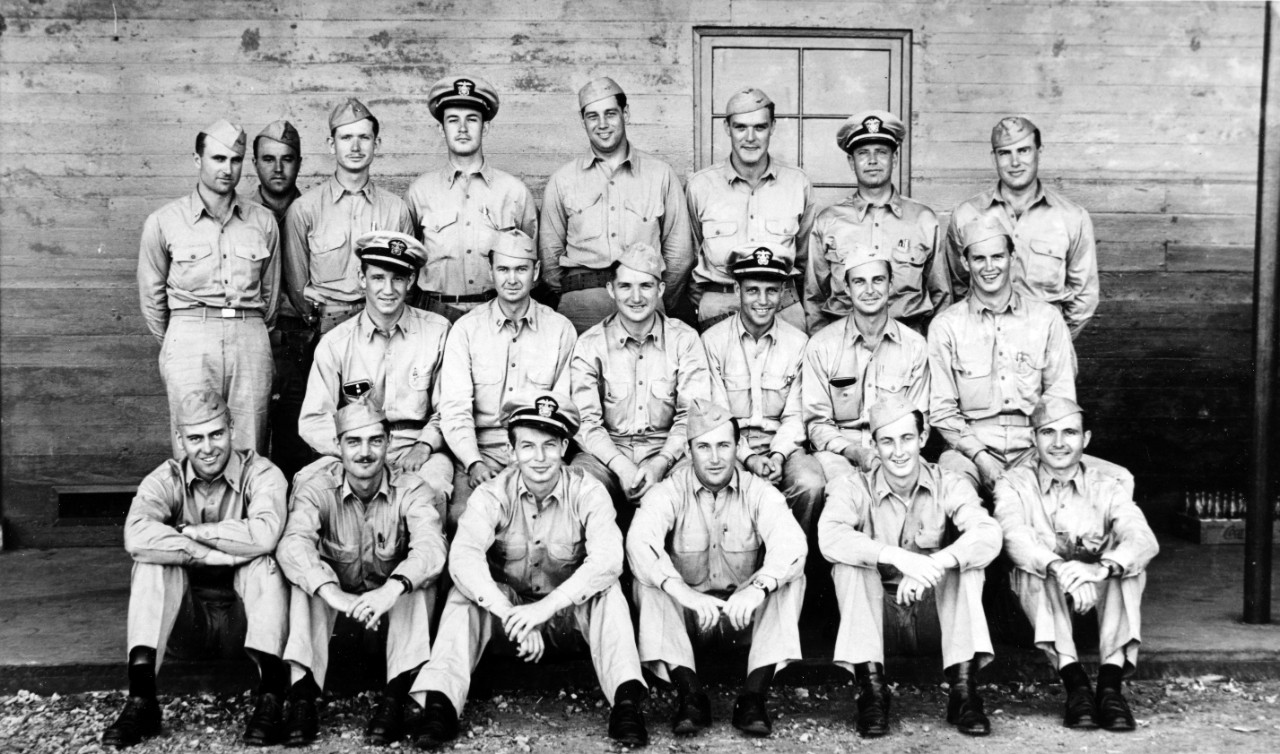
VT-3 pilots at NAS Kaneohe Bay, Hawaii in May 1942 before the Battle of Midway in which almost all were killed

- May–June 1942: VT-3, consisting primarily of its pilots, flight crews and a limited number of ground crewmen, operated from USS Yorktown during the Battle of Midway. The other officers and ground crews remained ashore at NAS Kaneohe Bay. Shortly after noon on the 4th, Lieutenant Commander L. E. Massey led a flight of 12 TBD Devastators into the attack against the Japanese carriers. They were the last of the three torpedo squadrons to engage the enemy. Only two aircraft survived, both flown by enlisted pilots. The two surviving TBDs returned to the task force while Yorktown was under attack from Japanese carrier aircraft. These two TBDs were ditched and their crews picked up by ships in the task force. VT-3's survivors from Yorktown returned to the squadron at NAS Kaneohe Bay. Lieutenant Commander Massey was posthumously awarded the Navy Cross for his action during the battle. Eleven other squadron TBD pilots also were awarded the Navy Cross, they were Ensign Wesley F. Osmus, Ensign Carl A. Osberg, Lieutenant Patrick H. Hart, Enlisted Pilot Harry L. Corl, Enlisted Pilot Wilhelm G. Esders, Lieutenant (jg) Curtis W. Howard, Ensign Leonard L. Smith, Enlisted Pilot John W. Haas, Ensign David J. Roche, Ensign Oswald A. Powers, and Lieutenant (jg) Richard W. Suesens.
- August 1942: Operating from USS Enterprise, VT-3 participated in the Battle of the Eastern Solomons.
- November 1942–July 1943: VT-3 operated from Saratoga, flying combat missions against various Japanese held islands in the South Pacific Area and providing air cover for American forces operating in the Eastern Solomons. When the squadron was not operating from Saratoga it was based ashore at various places, including Fiji; Efate and Espiritu Santo, New Hebrides; Tontouta, New Caledonia, and Guadalcanal, Solomons.
- May 1943: The British carrier HMS Victorious joined the Saratoga task force and operated with it until the latter part of July.
- 31 July 1943: VT-3's TBFs were transferred to Tontouta on 30 July and the following day squadron personnel embarked on HMS Victorious for transfer to CONUS to reform. This ended the air group and squadron's association with Saratoga.
- 25 September 1943: VT-3 and Saratoga Air Group were reformed at NAS Seattle. The Saratoga Air Group was reformed as Carrier Air Group THREE (CVG-3) with VT-3 as one of the three squadrons.
- November 1944: VT-3 conducted combat operations from USS Yorktown (CV-10) against targets in the Philippines in support of the Battle of Leyte.
- Dec 1944: The squadron flew combat operations from Yorktown against targets on Luzon in preparation for the invasion of the island. While retiring from the combat area Task Force 38, which included Yorktown and CVG-3, sailed through Typhoon Cobra which sank three destroyers and extensively damaged other ships in the task force.
- January 1945: Combat operations were conducted against targets in Formosa and the Philippines in support of the Invasion of Lingayen Gulf on Luzon in early January. With Yorktown leading the way, Task Force 38 entered the South China Sea on 10 January. VT-3 struck targets near Saigon and along the Vietnamese coast, Hong Kong and Canton areas, Formosa and Okinawa.
- 9 January 1945: For actions against enemy targets on Formosa Lieutenant Frank F. Frazier was awarded the Silver Star.
- February 1945: VT-3 participated in the first carrier strikes against the Tokyo area, bombing the Tachikawa Engine Factory, 16 miles from the Tokyo Imperial Palace. Following these strikes the squadron concentrated its attention on Chichi Jima and air support for the invasion of Iwo Jima. This operation was the last combat action for the squadron during World War II. In early March VT-3 transferred to USS Lexington for transit to the States.
- June–October 1948: During the squadron's tour of duty in the Mediterranean the Sixth Fleet was placed on alert due to the outbreak of the 1948 Arab–Israeli War following the establishment of the state of Israel.
- November 1948: The squadron participated in cold weather operations in the Northern Atlantic.

== Home port assignments ==
The squadron was assigned to these home ports, effective on the dates shown:

- USS Aroostook – 6 July 1925
- NAS San Diego – September 1925
- NAS Ford Island – January 1942
- NAS Kaneohe Bay – 3 February 1942
- Efate – Aug 1942 (When USS Enterprise was damaged by air attacks on 24 August, during the Battle of the Eastern Solomons, VT-3's surviving aircraft were flown to Efate. These aircraft remained at Efate while the majority of the squadron personnel went aboard USS Saratoga and returned to Hawaii in September 1942.)
- Hawaii – September 1942
- NAS Seattle – September 1943
- NAS Whidbey Island – 11 October 1943
- NAS Pasco – 2 February 1944
- NAS Alameda – 5 April 1944
- NAS Puunene – 22 April 1944
- NAS Hilo – 7 June 1944
- NAS Kahului – 22 July 1944
- NAS Seattle – March 1945
- NAAF Lewiston – 7 May 1945
- NAS Key West – 15 June 1945
- NAAS Oceana – 15 July 1945
- NAS Quonset Point – 11 August 1947
- NAAS Charlestown – 13 October 1947
- NAS Quonset Point – 21 March 1949

== Aircraft assignment ==
The squadron first received the following aircraft in the months shown:

- DT-2 – July 1925 (The aircraft were on loan to the squadron from NAS Pearl Harbor.)
- SC-2 – November 1925
- SC-1 – March 1926
- CS-1 – November 1926
- T2D-1 – June 1927
- T3M-2 – August 1927
- TB-1 – September 1927
- T4M-1 – July 1928
- TG-1 – June 1930
- TG-2 – April 1932
- TBD-1 – October 1937
- TBF-1 – July 1942 (VT-3's shore detachment received its first * TBF-1 in early May 1942. However, the squadron continued to operate the TBD-1s aboard the carrier until the latter part of July 1942 when it became an all TBF unit.)
- TBM-1C – March 1944
- TBM-3E – June 1945
- TBM-3Q – June 1946
- TBM-3J – May 1947
- TBM-3W – September 1947
- AD-1 – April 1949
- AD-2 – May 1949

== See also ==
- Attack aircraft
- History of the United States Navy
- List of inactive United States Navy aircraft squadrons
