= Indian Ocean raid =

1942 raid of Allied shipping by the Imperial Japanese Navy

- Part of the Pacific War and the Second World War
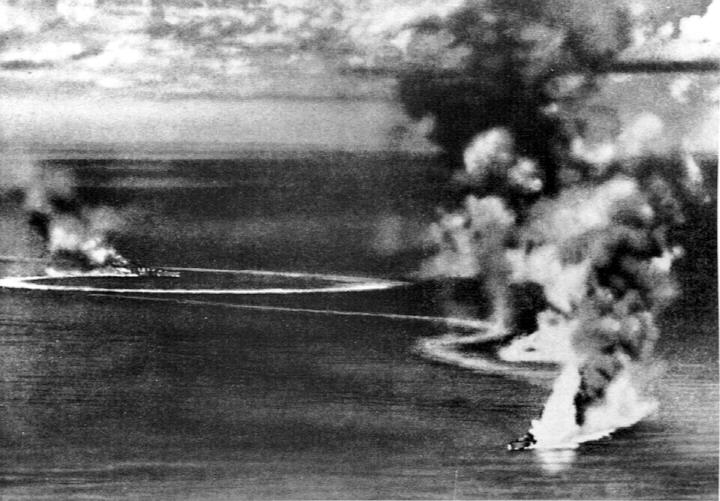
- British heavy cruisers HMS Dorsetshire and Cornwall under Japanese air attack and severely damaged on 5 April 1942.
Date	31 March – 10 April 1942
Location	Indian Ocean and British Ceylon 20°S 80°E
Result	Japanese victory

Belligerents
United Kingdom; British Ceylon; Australia; Netherlands; United States; Canada	(Empire of Japan) Japan

Commanders and leaders
James Somerville	Chūichi Nagumo; Mitsuo Fuchida

Units involved
(United Kingdom) Eastern Fleet	(Empire of Japan) Kido Butai (Southern Force)

Strength
2 Fleet carriers; 1 Light carrier; 5 Battleships; 7 Cruisers; 15 Destroyers; 7 Submarines; 100+ Aircraft; 30 smaller warships; 50+ Merchant ships	5 Fleet carriers; 1 Light carrier; 4 Battleships; 11 Cruisers; 23 Destroyers; 5 Submarines; 275 Aircraft

Casualties and losses
825 killed; 1 light carrier sunk; 2 heavy cruisers sunk; 2 destroyers sunk; 1 Armed Merchant Cruiser sunk; 1 Corvette sunk; 1 Sloop sunk; 20 merchant ships sunk; 54 aircraft destroyed	32 men killed; 17 aircraft destroyed; 31 aircraft damaged

The Indian Ocean raid (Operation C, the Third Mobile Operation in the Indian Ocean and the Battle of Ceylon in Japanese) was a sortie of the Imperial Japanese Navy (IJN) from 31 March to 10 April 1942. Japanese aircraft carriers (Admiral Chūichi Nagumo) struck Allied shipping, naval bases and airfields around British Ceylon but failed to find most of the Eastern Fleet. The British were forewarned by signals intelligence and the fleet sailed before the raid; its attempt to surprise the Japanese was frustrated by poor tactical intelligence.

Concurrent with Operation C, the IJN dispatched Malaya Force (Vice Admiral Jisaburō Ozawa) consisting of the aircraft carrier Ryūjō, six cruisers, a light cruiser and four destroyers, to raid the northern Bay of Bengal. In three days, Malaya Force aircraft and ships sank twenty merchant ships and damaged three, a total of over 130,000 GRT.

Following Operation C, the British expected a Japanese offensive in the Indian Ocean. The main base of the Eastern Fleet was moved to East Africa and Ceylon was reinforced. Somerville kept his fast carrier division, Force A, "in Indian waters, to be ready to deal with any attempt by the enemy to command those waters with light forces only". The Japanese had no plans to follow up their success and within the year, defeats in the Pacific made it impossible to do so.

== Background ==
=== British Ceylon (Sri Lanka) ===
Ceylon (now Sri Lanka) is off the south-east of India between shipping routes from Singapore and Rangoon to the Red Sea and the Persian Gulf. There are natural harbours at Colombo on the south-western coast and Trincomalee on the north-eastern coast, a naval anchorage and base. Ceylon was a geographically important part of the British Empire and its system of trade, communication and military organisation. In the 1930s more shipping tonnage was handled in Ceylon than all the ports of India. Since the beginning of the Second World War, the colonial government had engaged in mass recruitment for local defence, overseas labouring and expanded food production. Tea and rubber production was emphasised and rubber output rose from 99,500 long tons (101,100 t) in 1941 to 105,500 long tons (107,200 t) in 1943. The 3,600 workers in civil engineering converted to the repair and refitting of ships and the manufacture of dummy aircraft, guns and radar installations.

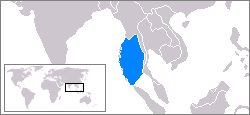
Location map of the Andaman Sea

When the Pacific War began on 7 December 1941, the Allied disasters in the Pacific, Malaya and the British débâcle at the Battle of Singapore in February 1942 made Colombo Harbour the basis for eastern trade and the centre for the assembly of Indian Ocean convoys. Colombo port was large enough for 45 ships but soon had 100 to 110 ships at once, causing much overcrowding. The fall of Singapore on 15 February 1942, the Allied defeat in the Dutch East Indies campaign (11 January – 9 March 1942) broke the British eastern defensive perimeter of the Bay of Bengal and the loss of the Andaman Islands on 23 March gave Japan control of the Andaman Sea, enabling ships to supply Japanese troops in the Burma Campaign. The Malacca Strait in the Netherlands East Indies was about 1,000 nmi (1,900 km; 1,200 mi) east of Trincomalee, making Ceylon a useful base for attacks on Japanese ships sailing to Rangoon in Burma.

Ceylon was hastily garrisoned by Australian troops returning from North Africa and HMS Indomitable was used as a high-speed aircraft ferry, shuttling fighter aircraft to Ceylon. From September to December 1941, 710 troop reinforcements arrived on the island and from January to March 1942, another 2,612 arrived; during April and June, 2,112 more troops joined the garrison and 4,993 troops moved between the Far East and Ceylon from October 1941 to March 1942. The extent of the disasters that befell the British in early 1942, led in March to Admiral Sir Geoffrey Layton being transferred from the temporary command of the Eastern Fleet and installed as the Commander-in-Chief, Ceylon, after Admiral James Somerville took over the fleet. Layton was given authority over the military forces on the island and the civilian authorities of the governor, Sir Andrew Caldecott, "Do not ask permission to do things. Do them and report afterwards what you have done". Layton found the same complacency and inertia in Ceylon as he had experienced in Malaya,

...he takes complete charge of Ceylon and stands no nonsense from anyone.... He pulls all the Ministers legs... and they work for him all the harder.

— Admiral Somerville

=== Japanese preparations ===
A Japanese offensive into the Indian Ocean was postponed in March 1942 because the IJN was needed in the western Pacific against the United States and the Imperial Japanese Army (IJA) refusal to allocate troops to invade Ceylon. The IJN planned a lesser effort, Operation C, also named the "Third Mobile Operation in the Indian Ocean", a raid in early April. Operation C aimed to destroy the Eastern Fleet and disrupt British communications in the Bay of Bengal, in support of the Japanese invasion of Burma. Admiral Isoroku Yamamoto issued the order to proceed with Operation C to the 2nd Fleet and the Southern Force (Nampō Butai) of the IJN (Admiral Nobutake Kondō) on 9 March 1942. By 16 March, the plan was for the Kido Butai (1st Air Fleet) was to depart from Staring Bay, Celebes, on 26 March for an attack on Colombo on 5 April (C day) to catch the Eastern Fleet in port.

The Japanese force, commanded by Admiral Chūichi Nagumo, had five aircraft carriers, Akagi, Shōkaku and Zuikaku in Carrier Division 5 and Sōryū and Hiryū in Carrier Division 2. The carriers were protected by the four Kongo-class battleships and both Tone-class cruisers. Japanese intelligence on the Eastern Fleet was accurate but overestimated the air strength on Ceylon. The 19 March order was vague, a "considerable" portion of British naval and air forces in the Indian Ocean were "deployed in Ceylon area". The Japanese sent submarines to Colombo and Trincomalee to keep watch but they achieved little. The Maldive Islands were reconnoitred by submarine but failed to uncover that Gan (Port T) was a fleet fuelling base.

==== 2nd Submarine Squadron ====
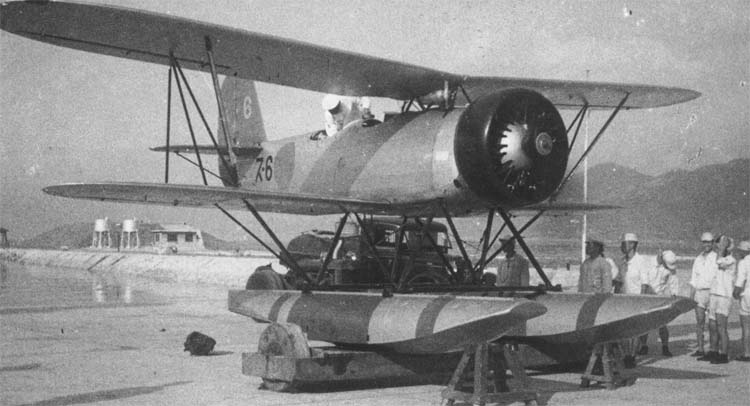
Example of a Watanabe E9W1 seaplane, similar to that carried by I-7

In Southern Force order 139, issued on 20 March, the commander of the 2nd Submarine Squadron, Rear-Admiral Hisashi Ichioka, required that two days before the raid on Ceylon, the submarine I-7 was to send its Watanabe E9W seaplane (Slim to the Allies) on reconnaissance over Colombo and Trincomalee and on the day of the carrier attack reconnaissance and weather data were to be gathered by I-2 and I-3. I-4 and I-6 were to attack Allied ships as the fled from Ceylon after the carrier raid. I-1 was sent back to Yokosuka for repairs to its starboard diesel and I-5 was to patrol off Cape Comorin (now Kanyakumari), the southern tip of India.

=== British preparations ===
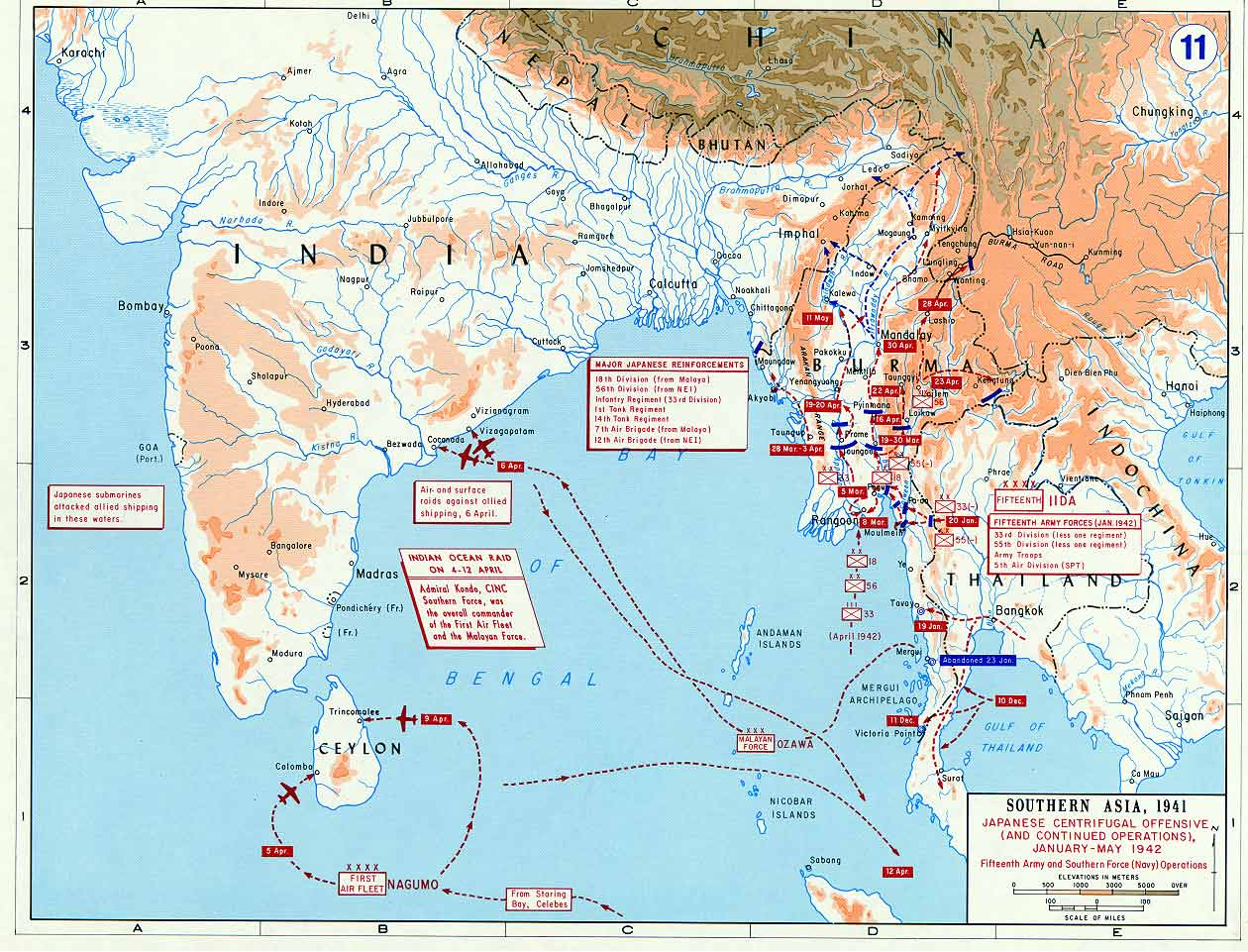
Japanese operations in the Northern Indian Ocean and Bay of Bengal in 1942. Southern Force is shown at the bottom of the map

The reinforcement of the Eastern Fleet depended on transfers from Britain and the Mediterranean. In late December 1941, a reassessment of the threat posed by Japan envisioned the Navy transferring the majority of the big ships to the Eastern Fleet. Matters were made urgent by the Attack on Pearl Harbor that sank much of the United States Pacific Fleet, that exposed the weak forces in Malaya to attack. Heavy units were freed by American reinforcements in the Atlantic. The pre-war rearmament was beginning to yield more big ships. The Mediterranean Fleet transferred far less reinforcements than expected due to its losses in 1941.

Somerville assumed command of an Eastern Fleet in March 1942 that was smaller than envisioned in December 1941. Somerville divided the fleet into a fast Force A comprising the aircraft carriers HMS Formidable and Indomitable, the modernised battleship HMS Warspite (as flagship) and the modern cruisers and destroyers. Force B was formed around the old carrier HMS Hermes and four un-modernised Revenge-class battleships; a few submarines were also available. The ships had not operated together before and ship and air crews were deficient in training.

The Far East Combined Bureau (FECB) intelligence assessment of the strength of the Japanese force was mistaken, identifying only two carriers in the Japanese force. FECB also believed the Japanese would sail from Staring Bay on 21 March and that C Day was 1 April. Somerville planned to evade the Japanese during the day and close for torpedo attacks at night with radar-equipped Fairey Albacore torpedo-bombers. Somerville had orders from the Admiralty, to protect the communications in the Indian Ocean and to keep the Eastern Fleet in being by avoiding risks but sailed to attack the Japanese force, having been convinced by the FECB that its assessment was accurate.

On 7 December 1941, the Ceylon air defences consisted of four obsolescent three-inch anti-aircraft guns at Trincomalee, with no fighters or radar. By 4 April, there were 67 Hawker Hurricanes and 44 Fairey Fulmar fighters, radar stations at Colombo and Trincomalee and 144 anti-aircraft guns. There were three RAF fighter squadrons, two at Colombo and one at Trincomalee, with 37–38 operational Hurricanes around Colombo on 5 April. Two squadrons of Fleet Air Arm (FAA) Fulmars had also arrived. Other squadrons increased from eight obsolete torpedo bombers, to seven Consolidated PBY Catalina flying boats, 14 Bristol Blenheim IV bombers, and 12 Fairey Swordfish torpedo bombers. On the eve of the battle, the air defences were part of 222 Group (Air Vice-Marshal John D'Albiac).

== Raid ==
=== 26 March − 3 April ===
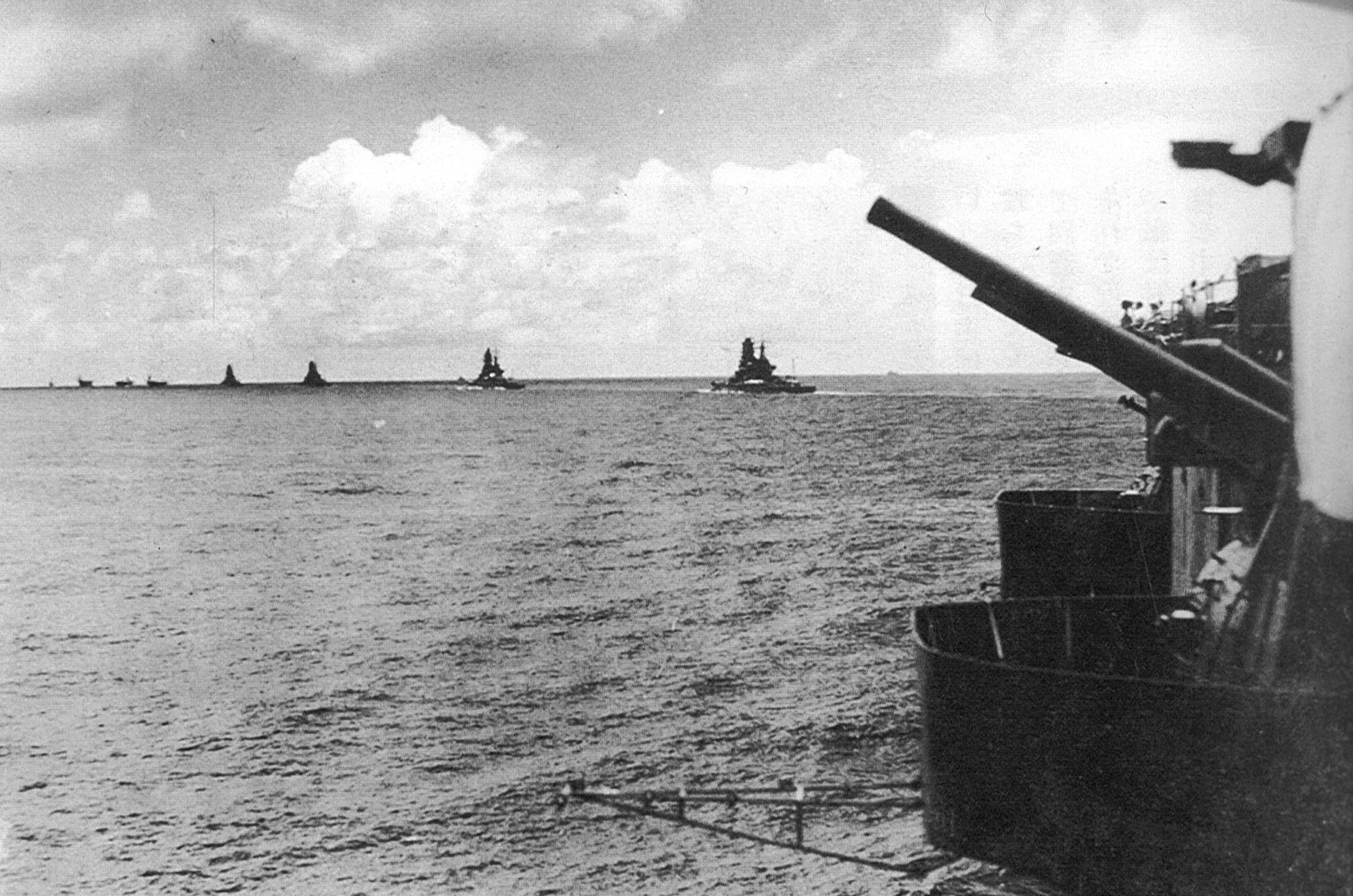
The Southern Force heading for the Indian Ocean on 30 March. Left to right, Akagi, Sōryū, Hiryū, Hiei, Kirishima, Haruna and Kongō, photographed from Zuikaku

The Japanese sailed from Staring-baai (Staring Bay) on 26 March as planned. Somerville sailed on 30 March, expecting an attack on 1 April and took the fleet to a patrol area 100 nmi (190 km; 120 mi) south of Ceylon. Ceylon air defences and forces went on alert, with land-based aerial reconnaissance concentrating on the south-east, where the Japanese were expected to approach for attacks on Colombo and Trincomalee. Late on 2 April, the Eastern Fleet retired toward Port T 600 nmi (1,100 km; 690 mi) south-west of Ceylon to fuel. Somerville detached several ships to resume their commitments; the heavy cruisers HMS Cornwall and Dorsetshire were sent to Colombo and Hermes to Trincomalee. The air defences stood down, except for Catalina patrols.

=== 4 April ===
At about 16:00 on 4 April, PBY Catalina flying boat (AJ155/QL-A) from 413 Squadron, Royal Canadian Air Force (RCAF) flown by Squadron Leader Leonard Birchall spotted the Southern Force 360 mi (580 km) south-east of Ceylon on a course that would have entered the British fleet patrol area from the south. The Catalina transmitted the sighting but not the size of the force before being shot down. Somerville was refuelling at Port T; Force A sailed eastwards toward the Japanese upon receiving the sighting; Force B could not be ready until 5 April. Catalina FV-R from 205 Squadron took off at 17:45 to shadow the Japanese force, making its first report at 22:37 on 4 April and a final report at 06:15 on 5 April while 110 nmi (200 km; 130 mi) from Ceylon. FV-R was shot down about 90 minutes after the final report.

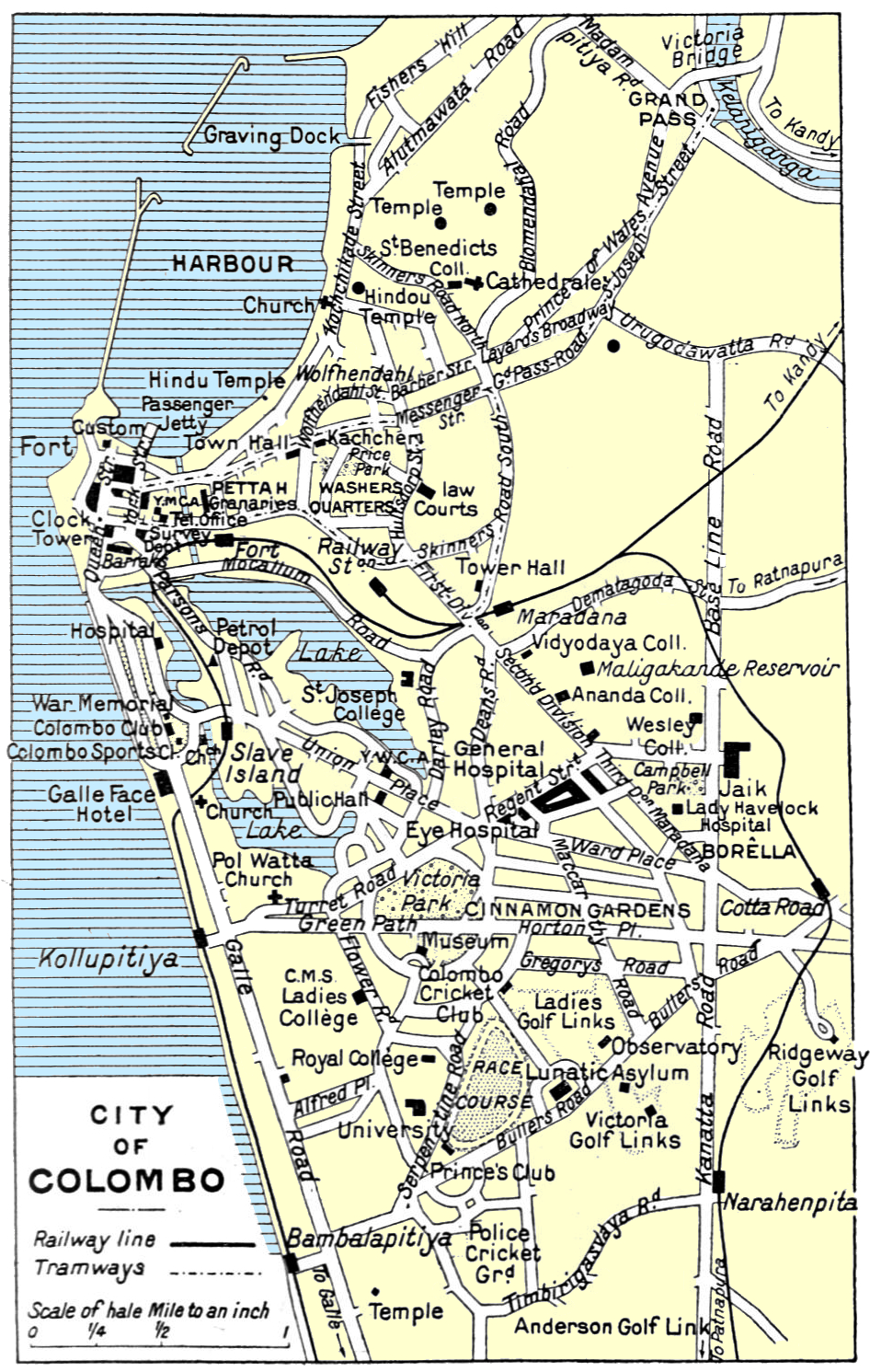
1930 diagram of Colombo and the harbour

D'Albiac briefed his staff on an anticipated Japanese attack after dawn, 222 Group issued a warning and units went on alert at 04:00 on 5 April. Six Swordfish from 788 Naval Air Squadron (788 NAS) flew from China Bay, near Trincomalee, to Colombo, to be ready for an attack on the Japanese force. Layton ordered ships to disperse from harbour. Cornwall and Dorsetshire, that had just reached Colombo, had been sent back towards Force A late on 4 April. Hermes sailed from Trincomalee and was ordered to hide north-east of Ceylon. The Japanese did not reconnoitre their intended course on the afternoon of 4 April and a reconnaissance of Colombo harbour by cruiser floatplanes was cancelled. The Japanese intercepted a signal from Colombo asking QL-A to repeat its report, the Japanese had lost surprise.

=== 5 April ===
Japanese intelligence on the morning of 5 April 1942 indicated that British carriers were absent and the Japanese morning air search was limited accordingly. At dawn, Japanese aircraft flew off to the south-west and north-west out to 200 nmi (370 km; 230 mi) over the next few hours. At 08:00 a Fulmar from Force A spotted one of the Japanese aircraft at the extreme edge of the south-west search area, at 08:55 about 140 nmi (260 km; 160 mi) ahead of Force A. Shortly after 06:00, 91 Japanese bombers and 36 fighters began taking off for the attack on Colombo. British early warning failed to detect the Japanese aircraft and British pilots had to scramble when the first Japanese aircraft appeared overhead at 07:45.

The defence of Ratmalana airfield by British fighters left the harbour wide open. HMS Hector, an armed merchant cruiser, the Norwegian tanker Soli and the old destroyer HMS Tenedos were sunk; three other ships were damaged. The port was damaged but not put out of action. At Ratmalana airfield, RAF Hurricanes and FAA Fulmars were caught taxiing and taking off by Japanese dive-bombers and fighters. Twenty of the 41 British fighters that took off were shot down. At least one fighter was damaged and crashed on take-off. The six Swordfish aircraft of 788 NAS arrived overhead, quickly to be shot down by the Japanese fighters; the Japanese lost seven aircraft.

==== Cornwall and Dorsetshire ====
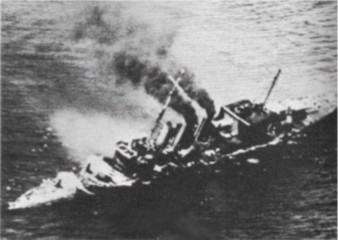
HMS Cornwall burning and sinking on 5 April 1942

Nagumo changed course to west-south-west at 08:30, unknowingly causing the opposing fleets to steam toward one another and recovered the aircraft from 09:45 to 10:30. The size of the attack on Colombo was Somerville's first evidence that the Japanese force had more than the two carriers expected. Somerville continued to steam toward the Japanese force at 18 kn (33 km/h; 21 mph). Radar-based fighter direction would allow Force A to avoid surprise attack by neutralising shadowing Japanese aircraft. At 10:00, an aircraft from Tone searching to the south-west, spotted the two cruisers and began shadowing; the aircraft reported that the cruisers were heading south-west at 24 kn (44 km/h; 28 mph). Cornwall was heading for Colombo to resume its refit and Dorsetshire to escort a troop convoy. The cruisers reported the shadowing aircraft but had no means to drive it off.

Nagumo had increased speed from 24 to 28 kn (44 to 52 km/h; 28 to 32 mph) on receiving the sighting. The Carrier Division 5 reserve was ordered to rearm with torpedoes, replacing the bombs intended for a second attack on Colombo. The rearming took too long and Carrier Division 2 attacked instead. Sōryū and Hiryū began launching dive-bombers at 11:45. Radar on the Force A ships detected the attack on the cruisers at 13:44, putting the aircraft 34 nmi (63 km; 39 mi) to the north-east. Cornwall and Dorsetshire were sunk at 14:00 with the loss of 424 men. The Japanese did not find Force A after sinking the cruisers. Had the aircraft shadowing the cruisers flown another 50 nmi (93 km; 58 mi) along the cruisers' course before returning to Tone, it would have detected Force A. The Japanese aircraft began landing at 14:45.

=== 5 April, afternoon ===
Somerville launched four Albacores from Indomitable at 14:00 to search an arc to the north-east out to 200 nmi (370 km; 230 mi). The south-easterly course of the Japanese force would have taken it through the centre of the arc. At 15:00 or 15:30, Nagumo changed course to the south-west. Carrier Division 2 did not immediately follow; it performed a series of kinking manoeuvres starting at 15:00 that initially took it north-west. Carrier Division 2 was spotted by the two northerly Albacores around 16:00. Zeros from Hiryū intercepted the Albacores, damaging one at 16:04 and the other was shot down at 16:28 without reporting. The two southern-most Albacores missed the Southern Force.

Somerville received the damaged Albacore's sighting report at 16:55 giving the position of Carrier Division 2 with reasonable accuracy, 125 nautical miles (232 km; 144 mi) away but nothing else. At 17:00 he received signals intelligence from Colombo reporting the Japanese course at 14:00 to be south-westerly, at 24 kn (44 km/h; 28 mph). Somerville ordered a course change to the south-west at 17:26, not knowing that Nagumo's main body was 120 nmi (220 km; 140 mi) away and that Carrier Division 2 was only 100 nmi (190 km; 120 mi) away. The course change meant that the British lost an opportunity to attack; had Force A continued on its easterly course, Carrier Division 2 would have passed across its front at 21:00 at a range of about 20 nmi (37 km; 23 mi).

There were two revisions to the 16:05 sighting, transmitted to Somerville at 18:00 and 18:17 respectively that differed significantly from each other and the original report. The final revision identified Carrier Division 2 but they were heading north-west 25 nmi (46 km; 29 mi) of the original sighting. The course heading conflicted with the first revision, that suggested a course toward the south-east. Late on 5 April, FECB decrypted a JN 25B message of Nagumo's planned movements on 6 April but this was no help as the transmission was garbled. Somerville ordered each of his carriers to prepare a squadron of torpedo-bombers for a night attack. Somerville declined to attack based on poor information and headed north-west in pursuit. A radar-equipped aircraft was launched to search a northern arc out to 200 nmi (370 km; 230 mi). Aircraft were sent later to search the easterly arc but it was too late to re-gain contact with the Japanese.

The Japanese missed an opportunity to find the British before night fell. Nagumo did not order a search for the British carriers at the appearance of carrier aircraft. Search aircraft might require homing signals from the carriers to return, that the British could also use. The Southern Force continued south-east at 20 kn (37 km/h; 23 mph) ignorant of Force A. Carrier Division 2 caught up at 22:00 180 nmi (330 km; 210 mi) due east of Force A. The Japanese circled wide to the south and then east ready to attack Trincomalee. The Japanese suspected the presence of British carriers and on the morning of 6 April sent aircraft on a comprehensive westwards search and still found nothing. Searches en route to Trincomalee were equally unsuccessful as the British carriers were far to the west.

=== 6–8 April ===
By 6 April, FECB decrypts of Japanese wireless codes indicated the force contained four carriers and three battleships, beyond the capacity of the Eastern Fleet to engage without undue risk. The declining serviceability of the fighter force reinforced his caution but Somerville did not immediately withdraw or return to port; Force B rejoined early on 6 April. In the afternoon 1,122 survivors from Cornwall and Dorsetshire were rescued, while maintaining a look-out for the Japanese force with all-around air reconnaissance. Intelligence from Ceylon put the Japanese between Port T and Ceylon. Somerville cautiously arrived at Port T from the west at 11:00 on 8 April and refuelled. The Eastern Fleet had withdrawn and the Japanese were approaching Trincomalee from the east. The Southern Force was detected by a RAF Catalina at 15:17 on 8 April and Vice-Admiral Geoffrey Arbuthnot the Commander-in-Chief, East Indies Station ordered that ships be dispersed from the harbour at Trincomalee that night. Hermes, escorted by HMAS Vampire, was sent south along the coast.

=== 9 April ===
==== Trincomalee ====
The danger of an attack on Trincomalee harbour like that on Colombo led to the port being emptied of many ships. Hermes and the Australian destroyer Vampire, the corvette Hollyhock, the minelayer Teviot Bank and several auxiliaries were ordered southwards along the coast, to be a minimum of 40 nmi (74 km; 46 mi) from port by dawn on 9 April. The monitor HMS Erebus that carried Type 285 radar and six 3-inch anti-aircraft guns had been sent to Trincomalee during March for anti-aircraft protection and the Netherlands Great War-vintage cruiser HNLMS Sumatra remained in port. Nine merchant ships of 3,000 GRT also remained, with nine small naval vessels. At dawn the AMES 272 at Elizabeth Point, north of the harbour, received indications of aircraft 15 and 30 nmi (28 and 56 km; 17 and 35 mi) out to sea, seaplanes had been sent from the Japanese fleet from 05:00 and 06:00 on reconnaissance towards the harbour and the coast on either side. A Catalina from 413 Squadron RCAF had set off from Koggala at 02:56 and between 07:08 and 07:16 the Catalina spotted the Japanese force about 205 nmi (380 km; 236 mi) east of Trincomalee. The aircraft was shot down by Zeros before a sighting report could be completed; it was the third Catalina lost since 4 April.

The Japanese air search on the morning of 9 April was limited as British carriers were no longer expected. The 91 Kate torpedo-bombers, armed with 800 kg (1,800 lb) bombs, escorted by 41 Zeros, was detected at 07:06 by AMES 272 91 mi (146 km) out from Trincomalee. The RAF and FAA scrambled 17 Hurricanes, most being Mk IIs and six Fulmars in good time and a section of three Hurricanes, already airborne on dawn patrol, attacked Zeros about 30 nmi (56 km; 35 mi) out to sea and shot down three for the loss of a Hurricane. The China Bay airfield and the port were severely bombed and the monitor Erebus was damaged. SS Sagaing (7,968 GRT) a merchant ship carrying aircraft as deck cargo and ammunition was set on fire and abandoned, with two men killed of the 138 crew, the hulk drifting into Malay Cove. Eight Hurricanes and a Fulmar were shot down and several unserviceable aircraft were destroyed on the ground; the Japanese lost three Zeros and a Kate.

==== At sea ====
Efficiency of 9 April attacks on ships at sea
Val	Ship	Hit	Notes
45	HMS Hermes	37	2, Akagi, 11, Hiryū, 14, Zuikaku, 18, Shōkaku
16	HMAS Vampire	16	12 Akagi, 4 Hiryū
6	HMS Hollyhock	1	From Sōryū
6	SS British Sergeant	6	3 Akagi, 3 Hiryū
6	RFA Athelstane	5	From Sōryū
6	SS Norviken	5	From Sōryū
85		70	

Around 10:25, nine un-escorted Blenheims from 11 Squadron attacked Nagumo's force and eluded the combat air patrol (CAP). Hiryū spotted the aircraft but failed to relay a warning to the other ships and the attack achieved surprise. The bombers attacked Akagi at 11,000 ft (3,400 m) and the bombs fell close to Hiryū but none hit. After they had bombed and turned for home, four Blenheims were shot down by Zeros of the standing patrol and another by Japanese aircraft returning from the attack on Hermes. A Zero was shot down near the carriers and another in the formation returning from Trincomalee.

This was the first time a Japanese carrier force had faced a concerted air attack. Hermes and Vampire were 65 nmi (120 km; 75 mi) away when Trincomalee was attacked. At 09:00 they reversed course and shortly after the attack on Trincomalee ended, a reconnaissance aircraft from Haruna spotted the ships. Eighty Aichi D3A Val bombers, held in reserve on the Japanese carriers, began an attack at 10:35 and the ships were sunk off Batticaloa before noon. Hermes was hit by over forty 500 lb (230 kg) bombs and sank with the loss of 307 men; eight of the crew on Vampire were killed when it was bombed and sank. The nearby hospital ship HMHS Vita was not attacked as it rescued 595 survivors. Aircraft from Sōryū attacked HMS Hollyhock, a Flower-class corvette that was escorting the oil tanker, RFA Athelstane, sank the corvette with the loss of 53 men and the tanker. The tanker SS British Sergeant and the cargo ship SS Norviken were also sunk. British Fulmars arrived from Trincomalee too late to help Hermes but shot down four Vals for the loss of two Fulmars.

=== Japanese withdrawal ===
By 13:25 the Japanese aircraft had landed apart from a standing patrol of Zeros over the fleet and Nagumo ordered the ships to turn east. At 19:30 the fleet changed course to the north-east for the Andaman Islands. Nagumo sent signals to the Combined Fleet reporting the sinking of Hermes and the other vessels, claiming a 77.6 per cent success rate for the dive-bombers during the day. One Japanese pilot described the sinking of the British ships as similar to bombing a target ship only easier. Later Japanese commentators thought that the success was a consequence of the Japanese naval aviators being the best in the world. During the raid, the 1st Air Fleet (Kidō Butai) suffered the loss of 17 aircraft, ten Vals, six Zeros and a Kate; 31 men were killed and two men severely wounded. On 10 April the fleet turned eastwards with standing patrols of Zeros keeping watch for submarines and reconnaissance aircraft. On the night of 11/12 April the fleet passed south of the Andaman Islands and turned for the Strait of Malacca. Soryū kept relays of four Kates and then four Vals airborne on patrol until 18:00. The ships passed Singapore on 13 April and the 5th Carrier Squadron detached for the South Pacific. On 22 April the remainder of the fleet began to enter ports in Japan.

== Associated operations ==
=== Malaya Force ===
Bay of Bengal location map

Concurrent with Operation C, the IJN dispatched Malaya Force (Vice-Admiral Jisaburō Ozawa) consisting of the aircraft carrier Ryūjō, six cruisers, a light cruiser and four destroyers on a raid in the northern Bay of Bengal. The force departed from Mergui (now Myeik, Myanmar) on 1 April. The Eastern Fleet was far to the south, operating against Operation C and the British were incapable of defending the merchant ships in the Bay, having only a couple of Indian sloops and the Greek destroyer Ierax for protection; merchant ships sailed in small groups and hugged the coast.

On 5 April, at 16°N, 88°E, Malaya Force divided into North, Centre and South forces to search for targets south of False Point (20°20′N, 86°44′E) and Cocanada (16°57′N, 82°15′E). On 5 April, aircraft from Ryūjō sank a ship and Calcutta (now Kolkata) from where ships had been ordered to disperse on 31 March, cancelled sailings on 6 April. A day later, aircraft from Ryūjō bombed the coastal towns of Cocanada and Vizagapatam causing minor damage and a panic that led to an exodus from both places. In three days, Malaya Force managed to sink 20 merchant ships and damage three more of over 130,000 GRT in attacks by aircraft and ships.

On the eastern side off the Bay, off Akyab (now Sittwe) in Burma at 20°7′N, 92°54′E, the Royal Navy and Royal Indian Navy were attacked by land-based aircraft and lost HMIS Indus, a Grimsby-class sloop, with ten men wounded. In the chaos caused by Operation C and the raid by Malaya Force, the Japanese were able to slip a convoy of troops and equipment into Rangoon.

=== 2nd Submarine Squadron ===
Of the seven ocean-going boats of the Japanese 2nd Submarine Squadron (Rear-Admiral Hisashi Ichioka) due to search for merchant ships and report on the Eastern Fleet, only five were operational when it began. I-1 had engine trouble and returned to Japan for repairs. I-5 went aground in the entrance to Kendari in the Celebes (now Sulawesi) on 28 February and it was still aground when the operation began, only joining in the operation on 25 March for a short and uneventful patrol around Ceylon. I-7 (Ichioka) was sent to reconnoitre the Ceylonese ports of Colombo and Trincomalee 48 hours before the first air raid but I-7 met difficulties. On 1 April a flying-boat attacked during the night when the submarine was 180 nmi (330 km; 210 mi) to the south-east of the island. British patrols caused a seaplane reconnaissance planned for the next day to be cancelled. On 3 April, the submarine attacked the British merchant ship Glenshiel and sank it with two torpedoes and bombardment from the deck gun.

Location of the Eight Degree Channel (Maliku Kandu)

I-3, with the commander of the 7th Submarine Division aboard, set off from Penang on 28 March for Colombo to study British ship movements and make weather forecasts. On 3 April the captain reported that there was difficulty in getting close to Colombo but by 5 April it had closed to 36 nmi (67 km; 41 mi) and transmitted tow weather reports. On the morning of 7 April I-3 was 100–150 nmi (190–280 km; 120–170 mi) to the west of Colombo, found seven freighters and fired four torpedoes at three ships and fired 39 shells from the deck gun and claimed to have damaged British Elmdale with the gun.

On 8 April, J-3 sank the British ship Fultala (5,051 GRT) with a torpedo 180 nmi (330 km; 210 mi) west of Colombo. On 28 March I-2 departed Penang for Trincomalee, reaching its destination on 3 April, to report on British ship movements and the weather; during the Japanese raid of 9 April, I-2 saw several British ships being sunk. J-3 began its return journey on 10 April to Singapore having failed to find any targets. I-4 sailed from Penang to observe the Eight Degree Channel at the north end of the Maldives and on 6 April sank the US freighter Washingtonian (6,617 GRT) by torpedo.

I-6 began its patrol on 26 March against shipping off Bombay (now Mumbai) on the north-west coast of India and on 31 March, claimed a merchantman east of the Eight Degree Channel. On 2 April it sank the British Clan Ross (5,897 GRT) off Bombay with three torpedoes. On 7 April it sank British Bahadur (5,424 GRT) but took seven torpedoes and eight shells from the deck gun. After the 9 April raid on Trincomalee Ichioka gave orders for the squadron return to Singapore, the boats arriving from 15 to 17 April. The six submarines sank six merchant ships (five certain) and four motor sailing ships. British records list five ships of 32,404 GRT, a disappointing tally given the number of ships in the region and the squadron had not spotted any ships of the Eastern Fleet. After the operation, the Japanese thought that dispersing the submarines was a mistake and that they would have been more effective if they had all operated off Colombo. (Note: Japanese submarines rarely used their seaplanes for the reconnaissance of ports after this operation.)

== Aftermath ==
=== Analysis ===
In 2017, Andrew Boyd wrote that an Admiralty study, "Future British Naval Strategy" (14 December 1941) formed part of a comprehensive review of policy for the Far East, now that Japan had joined the war. The review emphasised the containment of the Japanese expansion, avoiding the loss of Singapore and other strategically valuable areas necessary for military recovery and reconquest. For six months, at least, the Indian Ocean was vital to the British and the corollary was the protection of Ceylon, whose defences were exiguous. The security of the Indian Ocean was a naval matter and a considerable effort would be necessary, with support from the United States Navy limited to the Atlantic. The review recognised that the Far East and Middle East must be seen as a whole. The Indian Ocean was perhaps, at the start of 1942, the most important theatre of operations for the British and the US after the Battle of the Atlantic and impinged on the survival of the USSR.

Somerville might have called the Eastern Fleet a rabble but it contained a large proportion of the big ships of the navy. Boyd wrote that operations around Ceylon had been historically neglected, treated more as disasters for a navy that was incapable of challenging the superiority of the Imperial Japanese Navy and a strategic sideshow. Boyd called the operations "more interesting" than that. Somerville

...underestimated the risks he was running at least up to dusk on 5 April. He drew over-optimistic conclusions from the...intelligence, he grossly underestimated IJN air strength and he hazarded the fleet against his instructions from the chiefs of staff. Ceylon was not his finest hour.

Japanese air superiority made it difficult to scout, close and attack during the day and a radar-based night attack was risky. Careful positioning, luck and Japanese errors nearly produced the conditions for an attack on the night of 5/6 April. The Southern Force was within 125 nmi (232 km; 144 mi) but information on the Japanese position was missing. Even then, it required experienced air crews to find their targets at night using new tactics and radar sets with a range of 20 nmi (37 km; 23 mi). Boyd wrote that Somerville took too many chances, especially sailing on 30 March, yet had come close to a resounding victory. Had the Japanese had approached as expected from the south-east and the British failed to find them, the two forces would be about 100 nmi (190 km; 120 mi) apart at dawn. The British could have been detected by Japanese aerial reconnaissance and attacked by carrier aircraft all day. The Eastern Fleet would have been just as vulnerable had they been present when the Japanese arrived from the south-west.

The failure of the Japanese to appear as anticipated on 1–2 April, led Somerville mistakenly to believe that all of the intelligence on Operation C was flawed. He detached Cornwall, Dorsetshire and Hermes that were sunk in areas watched by Japanese aerial reconnaissance. Re-fuelling at Port T a few days later, rather than at Ceylon on 2 April, kept the British away from the Southern Force and perhaps averted disaster. The Japanese failed to find the bulk of the Eastern Fleet and the British overestimated the danger to Ceylon, because signals intelligence had suggested that the Japanese were preparing a deliberate advance across the Indian Ocean. The raid demonstrated that the RAF was too weak to defend Ceylon and that the navy was ill-prepared to meet a Japanese carrier force. By June, Ceylon had three RAF fighter squadrons (64 aircraft, plus 50 per cent reserves) three anti-shipping squadrons (including one of Beaufort torpedo bombers) also with 50 per cent reserves and much improved radar with the anti-aircraft defences manned by two Australian infantry brigades.

The Eastern Fleet withdrew to the port of Kilindini in the East Africa Protectorate (Kenya) temporarily to abandon the eastern Indian Ocean to Japan; from there it contested control of the central Indian Ocean. On 18 April, the Eastern Fleet was accorded the highest priority for reinforcement, including the transfer of most of the carriers from the Home Fleet and the Mediterranean Fleet, intended to return to Ceylon in September, having received Warspite, HMS Valiant, HMS Nelson and HMS Rodney. Force A, with its two aircraft carriers, went to Bombay and Somerville sent the force to the central Indian Ocean several times over the next six months, operating near Ceylon for about half the time. The invasion scare was short-lived, British intelligence detecting the movement of the Japanese carrier force eastwards in mid-April and its arrival in the Pacific in mid-May. The reinforcement of the Eastern Fleet stopped and it was reduced in size in late July. In September, British intelligence predicted Japan would go over to the defensive.

Boyd called Nagumo rigid and unimaginative, contributing to the escape of the Eastern Fleet. The manoeuvring of the force was mainly to facilitate the raids on Colombo and Trincomalee; that the British might be at sea was apparently not seriously considered. He failed to appreciate that the direction that Cornwall and Dorsetshire was sailing and the later appearance of British carrier aircraft, were related. Aerial reconnaissance to provide Nagumo with information about his front and flanks was inadequate. Assuming that there was nothing to be found outside of the few searches made was an error. The lack of air reconnaissance reflected IJN practice, air searches being based on expected threats. More aircraft were devoted to the morning search on 6 April, on suspicion that British carriers might be present. Later air searches were reduced, when the British carriers had not been found and there was little expectation of encountering them. It was difficult to rearm aircraft at short notice and the lack of radar allowed the Blenheims to evade the CAP and this happened again disastrously at the Battle of Midway (4–7 June 1942).

The Japanese did not exploit their victory as the British feared, their aircraft carriers needed maintenance and replenishment after months of operations and there was already difficulty in maintaining the strength of front line air units. Japanese commanders felt that the losses inflicted on the British did not justify the cost to Japanese aircrew. In early May, the aircraft carriers fought the Battle of the Coral Sea in the south-west Pacific, followed in June by the Battle of Midway ended the threat of serious Japanese naval operations in the Indian Ocean. Later Japanese operations, were conducted by submarines and armed merchant cruisers, with some success. The Allies invaded Madagascar (5 May – 6 November 1942) to prevent the Japanese from establishing a base to attack shipping and Japanese submarines attacked the harbour at Diego-Suarez.

=== Casualties ===
Losses in Indian Ocean operations 2–9 April
	British	Japanese
Personnel	1,028	32
Navy ships	7	0
Merchant ships	29	0
Aircraft	54	18

The Japanese damaged port facilities, sank the aircraft carrier Hermes, the cruisers Cornwall and Dorsetshire, destroyed a third of the British ground-based fighters and nearly all of the ground-based anti-shipping aircraft. In April, the Japanese sank 27 merchant ships, totalling 112,312 GRT including those by the Malaya Force raid further north in the Bay of Bengal and by submarines on the west coast of India, concurrent with Operation C. The Japanese lost 17 aircraft, six Zeros, ten Vals and a Kate, with 31 damaged.

== Japanese order of battle ==
=== Southern Force ===
Southern Force
Ship	(English)	Flag	Class	Notes
Vice-Admiral Chūichi Nagumo, C-in-C 1st Air Fleet (Kidō Butai)
Striking Force (Kūshū Butai)
1st Carrier Squadron
Akagi	Red Castle	Imperial Japanese Navy	Amagi-class aircraft carrier	
2nd Carrier Squadron
Sōryū	Blue [or Green] Dragon	Imperial Japanese Navy	aircraft carrier	
Hiryū	Flying Dragon	Imperial Japanese Navy	aircraft carrier	
5th Carrier Squadron (reserve)
Shōkaku	Soaring Crane	Imperial Japanese Navy	Shōkaku-class aircraft carrier	
Zuikaku	Auspicious Crane	Imperial Japanese Navy	Shōkaku-class aircraft carrier	

=== Support Force ===
Support Force (Shien Butai)
Ship	(English)	Flag	Class	Notes
3rd Battleship Squadron
1st Section
Hiei	Mount Hiei	Imperial Japanese Navy	Kongō-class battlecruiser	3 Dave seaplanes
Kirishima	Mount Kirishima	Imperial Japanese Navy	Kongō-class battlecruiser	3 Dave seaplanes
2nd Section
Haruna	Mount Haruna	Imperial Japanese Navy	Kongō-class battlecruiser	3 Dave seaplanes
Kongō	Mount Kongō	Imperial Japanese Navy	Kongō-class battlecruiser	3 Dave seaplanes
8th Cruiser Squadron
Tone	Tone River	Imperial Japanese Navy	Tone-class cruiser	1 Alf, 1 Jake, 3 Dave seaplanes
Chikuma	Chikuma River	Imperial Japanese Navy	Tone-class cruiser	1 Alf, 1 Jake, 3 Dave seaplanes

=== Kidō Butai cover force ===
Kidō Butai Keikei Butai
Ship	(English)	Flag	Class	Notes
1st Torpedo Squadron
Abukuma	Abukuma River	Imperial Japanese Navy	Nagara-class cruiser	1 Alf seaplane
4th Destroyer Division (2nd Section)
Hagikaze	Clover Wind	Imperial Japanese Navy	Kagerō-class destroyer	
Maikaze	Dancing Wind	Imperial Japanese Navy	Kagerō-class destroyer	
17th Destroyer Division
Hamakaze	Beach Wind	Imperial Japanese Navy	Kagerō-class destroyer	
Isokaze	Wind on the Beach	Imperial Japanese Navy	Kagerō-class destroyer	
Tanikaze	Valley Wind	Imperial Japanese Navy	Kagerō-class destroyer	
Urakaze	Wind on the Sea	Imperial Japanese Navy	Kagerō-class destroyer	
18th Destroyer Division
Arare	Hailstone	Imperial Japanese Navy	Asashio-class destroyer	
Kagerō	Heat Haze	Imperial Japanese Navy	Kagerō-class destroyer	
Kasumi	Haze	Imperial Japanese Navy	Asashio-class destroyer	
Shiranui	Phosphorescent Light	Imperial Japanese Navy	Kagerō-class destroyer	
Akigumo	Autumn Clouds	Imperial Japanese Navy	Kagerō-class destroyer	det. 5th Carrier Division

=== Japanese carrier aircraft ===
1st Air Fleet
Fighter	Dive bomber	Torpedo bomber	Notes
Air attack Group
Akagi
19 Zero	17 Aichi D3A (Val)	18 Nakajima B5N (Kate)	54 aircraft, not all used on raid
Sōryū
20 Zero	18 Aichi D3A (Val)	18 Nakajima B5N (Kate)	56 aircraft, not all used on raid
Hiryū
18 Zero	18 Aichi D3A (Val)	18 Nakajima B5N (Kate)	54 aircraft, not all used on raid
Reserve
Shōkaku
18 Zero	19 Aichi D3A (Val)	19 Nakajima B5N (Kate)	56 aircraft, not used on raid
Zuikaku
18 Zero	19 Aichi D3A (Val)	18 Nakajima B5N (Kate)	55 aircraft, not used on raid
Totals
93 Zero	91 Aichi D3A (Val)	91 Nakajima B5N (Kate)	275, 111 reserves

=== Supply Force (Hokyū Butai) ===
Supply Unit
Ship	Year	Flag	Class	Notes
1st Supply Division
MV Shinkoku Maru	1940	Imperial Japanese Navy	Kawasaki-type oiler	
MV Ken'yō Maru	1939	Imperial Japanese Navy	Kawasaki-type oiler	
MV Nippon Maru	1936	Imperial Japanese Navy	Kawasaki-type oiler	
MV Tōei Maru	1939	Imperial Japanese Navy	Kawasaki-type oiler	
MV Kokuyō Maru	1939	Imperial Japanese Navy	Kawasaki-type oiler	
MV Kyokutō Maru	1934	Imperial Japanese Navy	Kawasaki-type oiler	
2nd Supply Division
MV Nichirō Maru		Imperial Japanese Navy	Oiler	
MV Tōei Maru No. 2	1939	Imperial Japanese Navy	Kawasaki-type oiler	
MV Hōyō Maru	1939	Imperial Japanese Navy	Kawasaki-type oiler	

=== Submarine Unit C ===
Submarine reconnaissance
Boat	Year	Flag	Class	Notes
2nd Submarine Division
I-1	1924	Imperial Japanese Navy	Type J1 submarine	To Yokosuka for engine repairs
I-2	1926	Imperial Japanese Navy	Type J1 submarine	
I-3	1926	Imperial Japanese Navy	Type J1 submarine	
I-4	1929	Imperial Japanese Navy	Type J1 submarine	
I-5	1932	Imperial Japanese Navy	Junsen I Mod (I-5 class)	
I-6	1935	Imperial Japanese Navy	Junsen II (I-6 class)	
I-7	1937	Imperial Japanese Navy	Junsen III (I-7 class)	

=== Ships sunk, 5 April 1942 ===
British warships sunk or damaged
Ship	Flag	Class	Notes
Colombo harbour
HMS Hector	Royal Navy	Armed merchant cruiser	Damaged, settled on bottom
HMS Lucia	Royal Navy	submarine depot ship	Damaged
HMS Tenedos	Royal Navy	S-class destroyer	Sunk
At sea
HMS Cornwall	Royal Navy	County-class cruiser	Sunk
HMS Dorsetshire	Royal Navy	County-class cruiser	Sunk

Merchant ships sunk or damaged, 5 April 1942
Ship	Flag	GRT	Notes
Colombo harbour
SS Benledi	Merchant Navy	5,943	Damaged
SS Clan Murdoch	Merchant Navy	5,960	Damaged
MV Soli	Norway	5,834	Damaged

=== Air raids, 9 April 1942 ===
==== Warships ====
Sunk or damaged
Ship	Flag	Class	Notes
Trincomalee harbour
HMS Erebus	Royal Navy	Monitor	Damaged, 9† 22 wounded
HNLMS Sumatra	Royal Netherlands Navy	Java-class cruiser	Damaged
At sea
HMS Hermes	Royal Navy	Aircraft carrier	Sunk, 7°35′28.39″N, 82°5′55.09″E 307†
HMS Hollyhock	Royal Navy	Flower-class corvette	Sunk, 07°30′N, 81°57′E, 53†
HMAS Vampire	Royal Navy	V-class destroyer	Sunk, 8†
HMHS Vita	Royal Navy	Hospital ship	Rescued 600 survivors, undisturbed by Japanese aircraft

==== Merchant ships ====
Sunk or damaged
Ship	Year	Flag	GRT	Notes
In harbour
SS Sagaing	1925	Merchant Navy	7,968	Damaged, beached, scuttled 1943, 2† 136 surv.
At sea
RFA Athelstane	1918	Merchant Navy	5,571	Tanker, bombed, sunk, 07°30′N, 81°56′E, 0†
SS British Sergeant	1922	Merchant Navy	5,868	Tanker, bombed, sunk, 08°01′N, 81°38′E, 0† 59 surv.
MV Norviken	1925	Norway	2,924	Bombed, ship abandoned, 4† 42 surv.

=== Malaya Unit Striking Force ===
Malaya Force (1–11 April 1942)
Ship	(English)	Flag	Class	Notes
Vice-Admiral Jisaburō Ozawa
4th Carrier Squadron
Ryūjō	Prancing Dragon	Imperial Japanese Navy	Light aircraft carrier	
Mikuma	Mikuma River	Imperial Japanese Navy	Mogami-class cruiser	
Mogami	Mogami River	Imperial Japanese Navy	Mogami-class cruiser	
Suzuya	Suzuya River	Imperial Japanese Navy	Mogami-class cruiser	
7th Cruiser Squadron
Chōkai	Mount Chōkai	Imperial Japanese Navy	Takao-class cruiser	
Takao	Mount Takao	Imperial Japanese Navy	Takao-class cruiser	
11th Destroyer Division (to 3–4 April)
Yura	Yura River	Imperial Japanese Navy	Nagara-class cruiser	
Fubuki	Blizzard	Imperial Japanese Navy	Fubuki-class destroyer	
Shirayuki	White Snow	Imperial Japanese Navy	Fubuki-class destroyer	
Hatsuyuki	First Snow	Imperial Japanese Navy	Fubuki-class destroyer	
Murakumo	Massed Clouds	Imperial Japanese Navy	Fubuki-class destroyer	
20th Destroyer Division (from 3–4 April)
Amagiri	Fogged/Clouded Sky	Imperial Japanese Navy	Fubuki-class destroyer	
Ayanami	Morning Fog	Imperial Japanese Navy	Fubuki-class destroyer	
Shiokaze	Tide Wind	Imperial Japanese Navy	Minekaze-class destroyer	
Shirakumo	White Cloud	Imperial Japanese Navy	Fubuki-class destroyer	

=== Malaya Force groups ===
Malaya Force (1–11 April 1942)
Ship	(English)	Flag	Class	Notes
Northern Force
Kumano	Kumano River	Imperial Japanese Navy	Mogami-class cruiser	7th Cruiser Division
Suzuya	Suzuya River	Imperial Japanese Navy	Mogami-class cruiser	7th Cruiser Division
Shirakumo	White Cloud	Imperial Japanese Navy	Fubuki-class destroyer	20th Destroyer Division
Central Force
Ryūjō	Prancing Dragon	Imperial Japanese Navy	Light aircraft carrier	4th Carrier Division
Chōkai	Mount Chōkai	Imperial Japanese Navy	Takao-class cruiser	
Yura	Yura River	Imperial Japanese Navy	Nagara-class cruiser	
Asagiri	Morning Fog	Imperial Japanese Navy	Fubuki-class destroyer	20th Destroyer Division
Yūgiri	Evening Mist	Imperial Japanese Navy	Fubuki-class destroyer	20th Destroyer Division
Southern Force
Mikuma	Mikuma River	Imperial Japanese Navy	Mogami-class cruiser	7th Cruiser Division
Mogami	Mogami River	Imperial Japanese Navy	Mogami-class cruiser	7th Cruiser Division
Amagiri	Clouded Sky	Imperial Japanese Navy	Fubuki-class destroyer	20th Destroyer Division

=== Transport Force ===
Hokyū Butai
(English)|Flag|Class	Notes			
MV Nishiei Maru	—	Imperial Japanese Navy	Tanker	
Ayanami	Twilled Waves	Imperial Japanese Navy	Fubuki-class destroyer	Det. 4th Carrier Division
Shiokaze	Sea Breeze	Imperial Japanese Navy	Minekaze-class destroyer	Det. 4th Carrier Division

=== Guard Unit ===
Guard Unit
Ship	(English)	Flag	Class	Notes
Cover Force (Keikei Butai)
Sendai	Sendai River	Imperial Japanese Navy	Sendai-class cruiser	Flag, 3rd Torpedo Squadron
Fubuki	Blizzard	Imperial Japanese Navy	Fubuki-class destroyer	21st Destroyer Division, 3rd Torpedo Squadron
Shirayuki	White Snow	Imperial Japanese Navy	Fubuki-class destroyer	21st Destroyer Division, 3rd Torpedo Squadron
Hatsuyuki	First Snow	Imperial Japanese Navy	Fubuki-class destroyer	21st Destroyer Division, 3rd Torpedo Squadron
Murakumo	Massed Clouds	Imperial Japanese Navy	Fubuki-class destroyer	21st Destroyer Division, 3rd Torpedo Squadron
Uranami	Shore Wave	Imperial Japanese Navy	Fubuki-class destroyer	19th Destroyer Division, 3rd Torpedo Squadron
Isonami	Shore Wave	Imperial Japanese Navy	Fubuki-class destroyer	19th Destroyer Division, 3rd Torpedo Squadron

=== Ships sunk by Malaya Force ===
Merchant ships attacked
Ship	Year	Flag	GRT	Notes
Northern Force
SS Autolycus	1922	Merchant Navy	7,718	6 April 1942, gunfire, 19°40′N, 86°50′E, sunk, 18† 82 surv.
MV Elsa	1928	Norway	5,381	6 April 1942, gunfire, 35 nmi E. of Cuttack. sunk, 1† 29 surv.
Exmoor	1919	United States	4,986	6 March 1942, gunfire, sunk
SS Indora	1938	Merchant Navy	6,622	6 April 1942, gunfire, Bay of Bengal, sunk, 2† 81 surv.
SS Malda	1922	Merchant Navy	9,066	6 April 1942, gunfire, 19°45′N, 86°27′E, sunk, 25† 154 surv.
SS Silksworth	1922	Merchant Navy	4,921	6 April 1942, gunfire off Puri, sunk, 0† 57 surv.
SS Shinkuang	1920	Merchant Navy	2,410	6 April 1942, gunfire, off Puri, 3†
Central Force
MV Anglo Canadian	1928	Merchant Navy	5,268	Damaged
MV Banjoewangi	1939	Netherlands	1,279	6 April 1942, gunfire, sunk, 13†
MV Batavia	1939	Netherlands	1,279	Damaged
SS Bienville	1921	United States	5,491	6 April 1942, carrier aircraft, 17°48′N, 84°09′W, sank, 24† 17 surv.
SS Ganges	1930	Merchant Navy	6,245	6 April 1942, carrier aircraft, sunk, 15†
SS Harpasa	1934	Merchant Navy	5,082	5 April 1942, carrier aircraft 19°19′N, 85°46′E, sank, 11† 33 surv.
SS Marion Moller	1909	Merchant Navy	3,827	6 April 1942, damaged
SS Point Clear	1920	United States	4,839	Damaged
SS Sinkiang	1915	Merchant Navy	2,646	6 April 1942, carrier aircraft, 17°32′N, 82°50′E, 0†
SS Selma City	1921	United States	5,686	7 April 1942, carrier aircraft, sunk, 0†
SS Taksang	1935	Merchant Navy	3,471	6 April 1942, gunfire, 17°52′N, 83°40′E, sunk, 15† 107 surv.
MV Van der Capellen	1942	Netherlands	2,073	8 April 1942, carrier aircraft, sunk, 0†
Southern Force
MV Dagfred	1930	Norway	4,434	6 April 1942, gunfire, 16°15′N, 82°09′E, sunk, 0† 40 surv.
SS Dardanus	1923	Merchant Navy	7,726	6 April 1942, gunfire, carrier aircraft
SS Gandara	1919	Merchant Navy	5,281	6 April 1942, gunfire, 16°03′N, 82°20′E, sunk, 13† 69 surv.
SS Hermod	1925	Norway	1,515	6 April 1942, gunfire, Bay of Bengal, scuttled, 0†

== British order of battle ==
=== Army ===
Ceylon garrison, March 1942
Unit	Flag	Type	Notes
Ceylon Defence Force
Ceylon Light Infantry	British Army	Infantry	
Ceylon Planters Rifle Corps	British Army	Infantry	
Colombo Town Guard	British Army	Infantry	
Ceylon Garrison Artillery	British Army	Artillery	6-inch naval, 9.2-inch naval
65th Heavy AA Regt	British Army	Anti-Aircraft	40 × 3.7-inch AA,, 4 × 3-inch 20 cwt AA
43rd Light AA Regt	British Army	Anti-Aircraft	69 × Bofors 40 mm AA from March 1942
Indian Army
34th Indian Division	British Indian Army	Infantry	
21st (East Africa) Infantry Brigade	British Army	Infantry	Attached to 34th Indian Division
Australian Army
6th Australian Division
16th Australian Brigade	Australian Army	Infantry	
17th Australian Brigade	Australian Army	Infantry	

=== Royal Air Force, Fleet Air Arm ===
222 Group RAF
	Flag	Type	Base	Notes
RAF
Colombo
11 Squadron	Royal Air Force	Bomber	Racecourse	14 Blenheim Mk IV
30 Squadron	Royal Air Force	Fighter	RAF Ratmalana	22 Hurricane Mk IIb, 8 shot down
258 Squadron	Royal Air Force	Fighter	Racecourse	9 Hurricane Mk IIb, 5 Mk Ib, 8 shot down
Galle
202 Squadron	Royal Air Force	Flying boat	RAF Koggala	1 Catalina
205 Squadron	Royal Air Force	Flying boat	RAF Koggala	Catalina FV-R
413 Squadron	Royal Canadian Air Force	Flying boat	RAF Koggala	3 Catalina
Netherlands Naval Aviation Service
Groep Vliegtuig-2	Marineluchtvaartdienst	Flying boat	RAF Koggala	(Aircraft Group-2 [GVT-2]) Catalina Y-64
Groep Vliegtuig-16	Marineluchtvaartdienst	Flying boat	RAF Koggala	(GVT-16) Catalinas Y-55, Y-56 and Y-57
Trincomalee
261 Squadron	Royal Air Force	Fighter	RAF China Bay	1 Hurricane Mk I, 17 Mk IIb
273 Squadron	Royal Air Force	Fighter	RAF China Bay	16 Fulmar Mk I, Mk II
788 Naval Air Squadron	Fleet Air Arm	Torpedo-bomber	RAF China Bay	6 Swordfish, Albacore, 6 Swordfish shot down
803 Naval Air Squadron	Fleet Air Arm	Carrier fighter	RAF China Bay	12 Fulmar Mk II
806 Naval Air Squadron	Fleet Air Arm	Carrier fighter	RAF China Bay	12 Fulmar Mk II
814 Naval Air Squadron	Fleet Air Arm	Torpedo-bomber	RAF China Bay	10 Swordfish ashore from HMS Hermes
HMS Indomitable	Fleet Air Arm	Fighter	RAF China Bay	2 Martlet ashore from Indomitable

=== Eastern Fleet ===
Eastern Fleet
Ship	Flag	Class	Notes
Admiral James Somerville
Force A
HMS Formidable	Royal Navy	Illustrious-class aircraft carrier	
HMS Indomitable	Royal Navy	Illustrious-class aircraft carrier	
HMS Warspite	Royal Navy	Queen Elizabeth-class battleship	Flag
Heavy cruisers
HMS Cornwall	Royal Navy	County-class cruiser	
HMS Dorsetshire	Royal Navy	County-class cruiser	
Light cruisers
HMS Emerald	Royal Navy	Emerald-class cruiser	
HMS Enterprise	Royal Navy	Emerald-class cruiser	
Destroyers
HMS Foxhound	Royal Navy	F-class destroyer	
HMS Hotspur	Royal Navy	H-class destroyer	
HMS Napier	Royal Navy	N-class destroyer	
HMAS Nestor	Royal Navy	N-class destroyer	
HMS Paladin	Royal Navy	P-class destroyer	
HMS Panther	Royal Navy	P-class destroyer	
Vice-Admiral Algernon Willis
Force B
HMS Hermes	Royal Navy	Aircraft carrier	12 Fairey Swordfish, 10 ashore, 2 u/s
HMS Ramillies	Royal Navy	Revenge-class battleship	
HMS Resolution	Royal Navy	Revenge-class battleship	
HMS Revenge	Royal Navy	Revenge-class battleship	
HMS Royal Sovereign	Royal Navy	Revenge-class battleship	
Light cruisers
HMS Caledon	Royal Navy	C-class cruiser	
HMS Dragon	Royal Navy	Danae-class cruiser	
Jacob van Heemskerck	Royal Netherlands Navy	Tromp-class cruiser	
Destroyers
HMS Arrow	Royal Navy	A-class destroyer	
HMS Decoy	Royal Navy	D-class destroyer	
HMS Fortune	Royal Navy	F-class destroyer	
HMS Griffin	Royal Navy	G-class destroyer	
HNLMS Isaac Sweers	Royal Netherlands Navy	Gerard Callenburgh-class destroyer	
HMAS Norman	Royal Navy	N-class destroyer	
HMS Scout	Royal Navy	S-class destroyer	
HMAS Vampire	Royal Navy	V-class destroyer	

=== Eastern Fleet aircraft ===
Fleet Air Arm Naval Air Squadrons
	Type	Notes
HMS Formidable
818 Naval Air Squadron	9 Fairey Albacore	Torpedo-bomber
820 Naval Air Squadron	12 Fairey Albacore	Torpedo-bomber
888 Naval Air Squadron	12 Martlet Mk II	Fighter
HMS Indomitable
800 Naval Air Squadron	12 Fairey Fulmar Mk II	Fighter
827 Naval Air Squadron	12 Fairey Albacore	Torpedo-bomber
831 Naval Air Squadron	12 Fairey Albacore	Torpedo-bomber
880 Naval Air Squadron	9 Sea Hurricane Mk Ib	Fighter
HMS Hermes
814 Naval Air Squadron	12 Fairey Swordfish Mk I	2 u/s, 10 at China Bay

== Bibliography ==
=== Books ===
- Behrens, C. B. A. (1955). Hancock, K. (ed.). Merchant Shipping and the Demands of War. History of the Second World War United Kingdom Civil Series. London: HMSO. OCLC 498039 – via Archive Foundation.
- Boyd, Andrew (2017). The Royal Navy in Eastern Waters. Barnsley: Seaforth. ISBN 978-1-4738-9248-4.
- Boyd, Carl & Yoshida, Akihiko (2013). The Japanese Submarine Force and World War II. Annapolis, MD: Naval Institute Press. ISBN 978-1-5575-0015-1.
- Churchill, Winston (1950). The Hinge of Fate. Vol. IV. Boston: Houghton Mifflin Company. OCLC 874480453 – via Archive Foundation.
- Hurstfield, Joel (1953). Hancock, W. K. (ed.). The Control of Raw Materials. History of the Second World War, United Kingdom Civil Series (War Production Series, Director: M. M. Postan). London: HMSO and Longman, Green and Co. OCLC 698112.
- Defensive Phase. Ministry of Defence (Navy) War with Japan. Vol. II. London: HMSO. 1995. ISBN 978-0-11-772818-9.
- Hobbs, David (2013). "Chapter 7: Hermes". British Aircraft Carriers. Barnsley: Seaforth. ISBN 978-1-84832-138-0.
- Jackson, Ashley (2006). "Chapter 11: The Islands of the Indian Ocean". The British Empire and the Second World War. London and New York: Hambledon Continuum. pp. 307−349. ISBN 1-85285-417-0.
- Jordan, Roger W. (2006) [1999]. The World's Merchant Fleets 1939: The Particulars and Wartime Fates of 6,000 Ships (2nd ed.). London: Chatham/Lionel Leventhal. ISBN 978-1-86176-293-1.
- Joslen, Hubert Frank (1960). Orders of Battle: United Kingdom and Colonial Formations and Units in the Second World War 1939–1945 Based on Official Documents. History of the Second World War. Vol. II. London: HMSO. OCLC 1110934538.
- Parshall, Jonathan & Tully, Anthony (2005). Shattered Sword: The Untold Story of the Battle of Midway. Dulles, VA: Potomac Books. ISBN 1-57488-923-0 – via Archive Foundation.
- Perrett, Bryan (2014). Why the Japanese Lost. Barnsley: Pen & Sword Military. ISBN 978-1-78159-198-7.
- Piegzik, Mikhal A. (2022a). The Darkest Hour: The Japanese Naval Offensive in the Indian Ocean 1942 – The Opening Moves. Asia@War No.31. Vol. I. Warwick: Helion. ISBN 978-1-915070-61-6.
- Piegzik, Mikhal A. (2022). The Darkest Hour: The Japanese Naval Offensive in the Indian Ocean 1942 – The Attack against Ceylon and the Eastern Fleet. Asia@War No. 33. Vol. II. Warwick: Helion. ISBN 978-1-804510-23-0.
- Roskill, Stephen (1956). War at Sea 1939–1945: The Period of Balance. United Kingdom Military Series. Vol. II. London: HMSO. OCLC 59620954 – via Archive Foundation.
- Shores, Christopher; Cull, Brian; Izawa, Yasuho (1993). Bloody Shambles: The Defence of Sumatra to the Fall of Burma. Vol. II. London: Grub Street. ISBN 978-0-94-881767-0.
- Shores, Christopher; Cull, Brian; Izawa, Yasuho (2014) [1993]. Bloody Shambles: The Defence of Sumatra to the Fall of Burma. Vol. II. London: Grub Street. ISBN 978-0-94-881767-0.
- Stephenson, Charles (2022). The Eastern Fleet and the Indian Ocean 1942–1944: The Fleet that had to Hide. Barnsley and New York: Pen & Sword Books. ISBN 978-1-52679-776-6.
- Stille, Mark (2023). Japan's Indian Ocean Raid, 1942. Campaign No.396. Oxford: Osprey. ISBN 978-1-47285-418-6.
- Wallace, Gordon (1993). Carrier Observer A Back-Seat Aviator's Story. Shrewsbury: Airlife. ISBN 1-85310-307-1.
- Warner, Oliver; Bennett, Geoffrey; Macyntire, Donald G. F. W.; Uehling, Franck; Wettern, Desmond; Preston, Antony; Mordal, Jacques (1976). Histoire de la guerre sur mer: des premiers cuirassés aux sous-marins nucléaires [History of Naval Warfare: From the first Battleships to Nuclear Submarines]. Encyclopédie visuelle Elsevier (in French) (French trans. from Eng ed.). Paris Bruxelles: Elsevier Séquoia. ISBN 978-2-8003-0148-8.
- Woodburn Kirby, Stanley; Addis, C. T.; Meiklejohn, J. F.; Roberts, M. R.; Wards, G. T.; Desoer, N. L. (2004) [1958]. The War against Japan: India's Most Dangerous Hour. History of the Second World War, United Kingdom Military Series. Vol. II (facs. pbk. Naval & Military Press, Uckfield ed.). London: HMSO. ISBN 978-1-84-574061-0 – via Archive Foundation.

=== Journals ===
- Stuart, Robert (2014). "Air Raid Colombo, 5 April 1942: The Fully Expected Surprise Attack". Royal Canadian Air Force Journal. 3 (4). Department of National Defence of Canada. ISSN 1927-761X.
- Stuart, Robert (2006). "Leonard Birchall and the Japanese Raid on Colombo". Canadian Military Journal. 7 (4). Department of National Defence of Canada. ISSN 1492-0786.
- Tully, Anthony; Yu, Lu (2015). "A Question of Estimates: How Faulty Intelligence Drove Scouting at the Battle of Midway". Naval War College Review. 68 (2). United States Naval War College. ISSN 0028-1484.

=== Websites ===
- Allen, Tony (6 April 2017). "MV Banjoewangi". wrecksite.eu.
