= HMS Hermes (95) =

1924 unique aircraft carrier

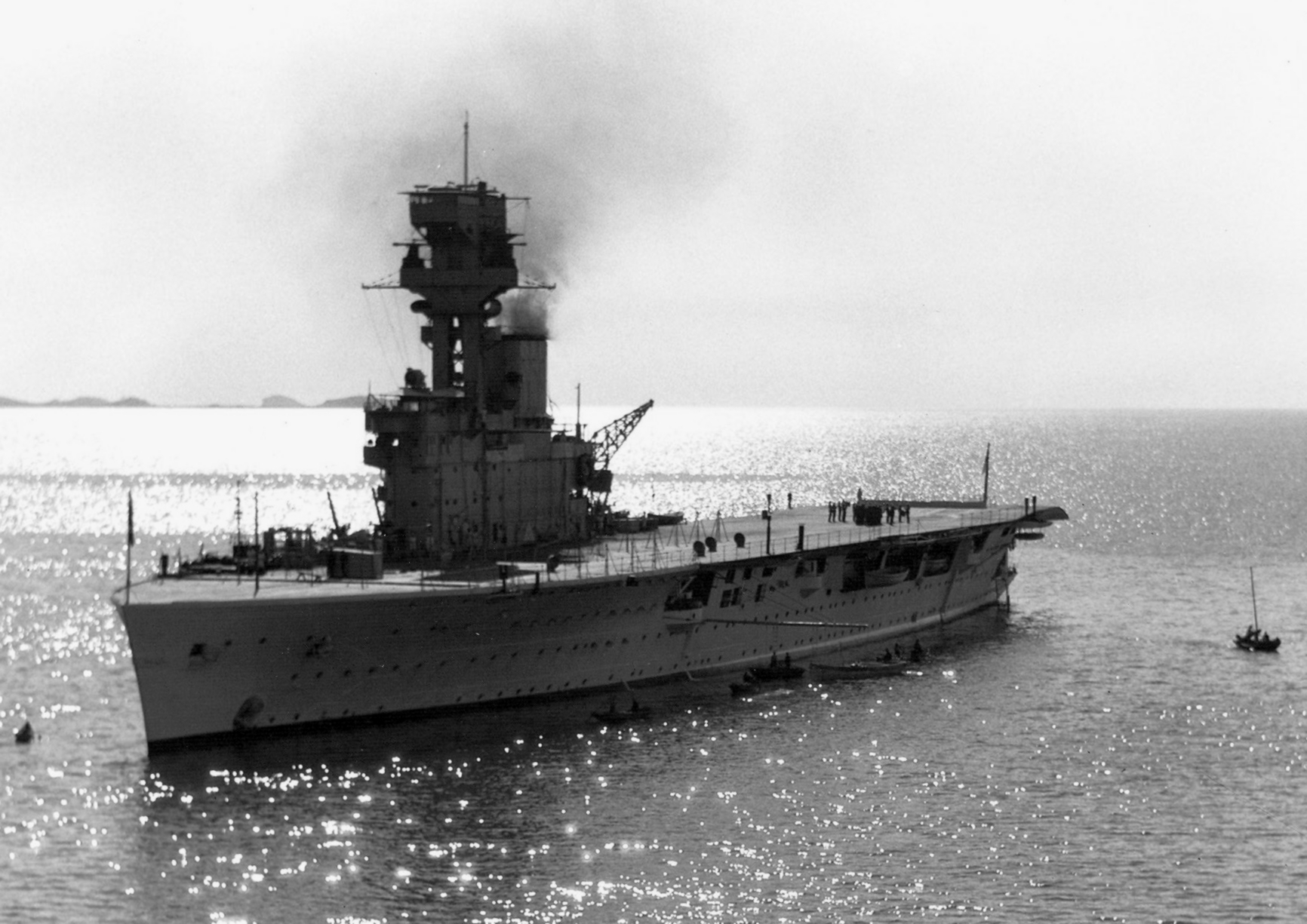
- Hermes off Yantai, China, c. 1931

History

United Kingdom
- Name: HMS Hermes
- Namesake: Hermes
- Ordered: April 1917
- Builder: Armstrong Whitworth
- Laid down: 15 January 1918
- Launched: 11 September 1919
- Commissioned: 18 February 1924
- Reclassified: Training ship, 16 July 1938; Aircraft carrier, 24 August 1939
- Identification: Pennant number 95
- Motto: Latin: Altiora Peto (I Seek Higher Things)
- Fate: Sunk by Japanese aircraft near Ceylon, 9 April 1942

General characteristics (as built)
- Type: Aircraft carrier
- Displacement: 10,850 long tons (11,020 t) (standard); 13,700 long tons (13,900 t) (deep load)
- Length: 600 ft (182.9 m)
- Beam: 70 ft 3 in (21.4 m)
- Draught: 23 ft 3 in (7.1 m) (deep load)
- Installed power: 6 water-tube boilers; 40,000 shp (30,000 kW)
- Propulsion: 2 shafts; 2 geared steam turbine sets
- Speed: 25 knots (46 km/h; 29 mph)
- Range: 5,600 nmi (10,400 km; 6,400 mi) at 10 knots (19 km/h; 12 mph)
- Complement: 566 (excluding aircrew)
- Armament: 6 × single 5.5 in (140 mm) guns; 3 × single 4 in (102 mm) AA guns
- Armour: Belt: 3 in (76 mm); Deck: 1 in (25 mm)
- Aircraft carried: 20

HMS Hermes was a British aircraft carrier built for the Royal Navy and was the world's first ship to be designed as an aircraft carrier, although the Imperial Japanese Navy's Hōshō was the first to be commissioned. The ship's construction began during the First World War, but she was not completed until after the end of the war, having been delayed by multiple changes in her design after she was laid down. After she was launched, the Armstrong Whitworth shipyard which built her closed, and her fitting out was suspended. Most of the changes made were to optimise her design, in light of the results of experiments with operational carriers.

Finally commissioned in 1924, Hermes served briefly with the Atlantic Fleet before spending the bulk of her career assigned to the Mediterranean Fleet and the China Station. In the Mediterranean, she worked with other carriers developing multi-carrier tactics. While showing the flag at the China Station, she helped to suppress piracy in Chinese waters. Hermes returned home in 1937 and was placed in reserve before becoming a training ship in 1938.

When the Second World War began in September 1939, the ship was briefly assigned to the Home Fleet and conducted anti-submarine patrols in the Western Approaches. She was transferred to Dakar in October to cooperate with the French Navy in hunting down German commerce raiders and blockade runners. Aside from a brief refit, Hermes remained there until the fall of France and the establishment of Vichy France at the end of June 1940. Supported by several cruisers, the ship then blockaded Dakar and attempted to sink the Richelieu by exploding depth charges underneath her stern, as well as sending Fairey Swordfish torpedo bombers to attack her at night. While returning from this mission, Hermes rammed a British armed merchant cruiser in a storm and required several months of repairs in South Africa, then resumed patrolling for Axis shipping in the South Atlantic and the Indian Ocean.

In February 1941, the ship supported Commonwealth forces in Italian Somaliland during the East African Campaign and did much the same two months later in the Persian Gulf during the Anglo-Iraqi War. After that campaign, Hermes spent most of the rest of the year patrolling the Indian Ocean. She was refitted in South Africa between November 1941 and February 1942 and then joined the Eastern Fleet at Ceylon.

Hermes was berthed in Trincomalee on 8 April when a warning of an Indian Ocean raid by the Japanese fleet was received, and she sailed that day for the Maldives with no aircraft on board. On 9 April a Japanese scout plane spotted her near Batticaloa, and she was attacked by several dozen dive bombers shortly afterwards. With no air cover, the carrier was quickly sunk by the Japanese aircraft. Most of the survivors were rescued by a nearby hospital ship, although 307 men from Hermes were lost in the sinking.

The wreck of the ship was discovered in the Bay of Bengal some sixty years after she was sunk roughly 45 mile northeast of Batticaloa. Hermes is shallow enough to be visited by recreational divers and is frequently visited by tourists.

== Development ==
Like Hōshō, Hermes was based on a cruiser-type hull and she was initially designed to carry both wheeled aircraft and seaplanes. The ship's design was derived from a 1916 seaplane carrier design by Gerard Holmes and Sir John Biles, but was considerably enlarged by Sir Eustace d'Eyncourt, the Director of Naval Construction (DNC), in his April 1917 sketch design. Her most notable feature was the seaplane slipway that comprised three sections. The seaplanes would taxi onto the rigid submerged portion aft and dock with a trolley that would carry the aircraft into the hangar. A flexible submerged portion separated the rear section from the rigid forward portion of the slipway to prevent the submerged part from rolling with the ship's motion. The entire slipway could be retracted into the ship, and a gantry crane ran the length of the slipway to help recover the seaplanes. The design showed two islands with the full-length flight deck running between them. Each island contained one funnel; a large net could be strung between them to stop out-of-control aircraft. Aircraft were transported between the hangar and the flight deck by two aircraft lifts (elevators); the forward lift measured 30 by 30 feet (9.1 by 9.1 m) and the rear 60 by 18 feet (18.3 by 5.5 m). This design displaced 9,000 long tons (9,100 t) and accommodated six large Short Type 184 seaplanes and six smaller Sopwith Baby seaplanes. The ship's armament consisted of six 4-inch (102 mm) guns.

The DNC produced a detailed design in January 1918 that made some changes to his original sketch, including the addition of a rotating bow catapult to allow the ship to launch aircraft regardless of wind direction, and the ship was laid down that month to the revised design. Progress was slow, as most of the resources of the shipyard were being used to finish the conversion of Eagle from a battleship to an aircraft carrier. The leisurely pace of construction allowed for more time with which to rework the ship's design. By mid-June the slipway had been deleted from the design and the ship's armament had been revised to consist of eleven 6-inch (152 mm) guns and only a single anti-aircraft gun. By this time, the uncertainty about the best configuration for an aircraft carrier had increased to the point that the Admiralty forbade the builder from working above the hangar deck without express permission. Later that year the ship's design was revised again to incorporate a single island, her lifts were changed to a uniform size of 44 by 20 feet (13.4 by 6.1 m), and her armament was altered to ten 6-inch guns and four 4-inch anti-aircraft guns. These changes increased her displacement to 10,110 long tons (10,270 t).

Construction was suspended after Hermes was launched in September 1919 as the Admiralty awaited the results of flight trials with Eagle and Argus. Her design was modified in March 1920 with an island superstructure and funnel to starboard, and the forward catapult was removed. The logic behind placing the island to starboard was that pilots generally preferred to turn to port when recovering from an aborted landing. A prominent tripod mast was added to house the fire-control systems for her guns.

The last revisions were made to the ship's design in May 1921, after the trials with Argus and Eagle. The lifts were moved further apart to allow for more space for the arresting gear and they were enlarged to allow the wings of her aircraft to be spread in the hangar. Her anti-ship armament was reduced to six 5.5-inch (140 mm) guns and her flight deck was faired into the bow.

=== Description ===
Hermes had an overall length of 600 feet (182.9 m), a beam of 70 feet 3 inches (21.4 m), and a draught of 23 feet 3 inches (7.1 m) at deep load. She displaced 10,850 long tons (11,020 t) at standard load. Each of the ship's two sets of Parsons geared steam turbines drove one propeller shaft at a speed of 25 knots (46 km/h; 29 mph). Steam was supplied by six Yarrow boilers operating at a pressure of 235 psi (1,620 kPa; 17 kgf/cm^{2}). The turbines were designed for a total of 40,000 shaft horsepower (30,000 kW), but they produced 41,318 shp (30,811 kW) during her sea trials, giving Hermes a speed of 26.2 knots (48.5 km/h; 30.2 mph). The ship carried 2,000 long tons (2,000 t) of fuel oil which gave her a range of 4,480 nautical miles (8,300 km; 5,160 mi) at 16 knots (30 km/h; 18 mph).

The ship's flight deck was 570 feet (173.7 m) long and her lifts' dimensions were 36 by 36.6 feet (11.0 by 11.2 m). Her hangar was 400 feet (121.9 m) long, 50 feet (15.2 m) wide and 16 feet (4.9 m) high. Hermes was fitted with longitudinal arresting gear. A large crane was positioned behind the island. Because of her size, the ship was able to carry only about 20 aircraft. Bulk petrol storage consisted of 7,000 imperial gallons (32,000 L; 8,400 US gal). The ship's crew totalled 33 officers and 533 men, exclusive of the air group, in 1939.

For self-defence against enemy warships, Hermes had six BL 5.5-inch Mk I guns, three on each side of the ship. All three of her QF Mk V 4-inch anti-aircraft guns were positioned on the flight deck. The ship's waterline belt armour was 3 inches (76 mm) thick and her flight deck, which was also the ship's strength deck, was 1 inch (25 mm) thick. Hermes had a metacentric height of 2.9 feet (0.9 m) and handled well in heavy weather. However, she had quite a large surface area exposed to the wind and required as much as 25 to 30 degrees of weather helm at low speed when the wind was blowing from the side.

== Service ==
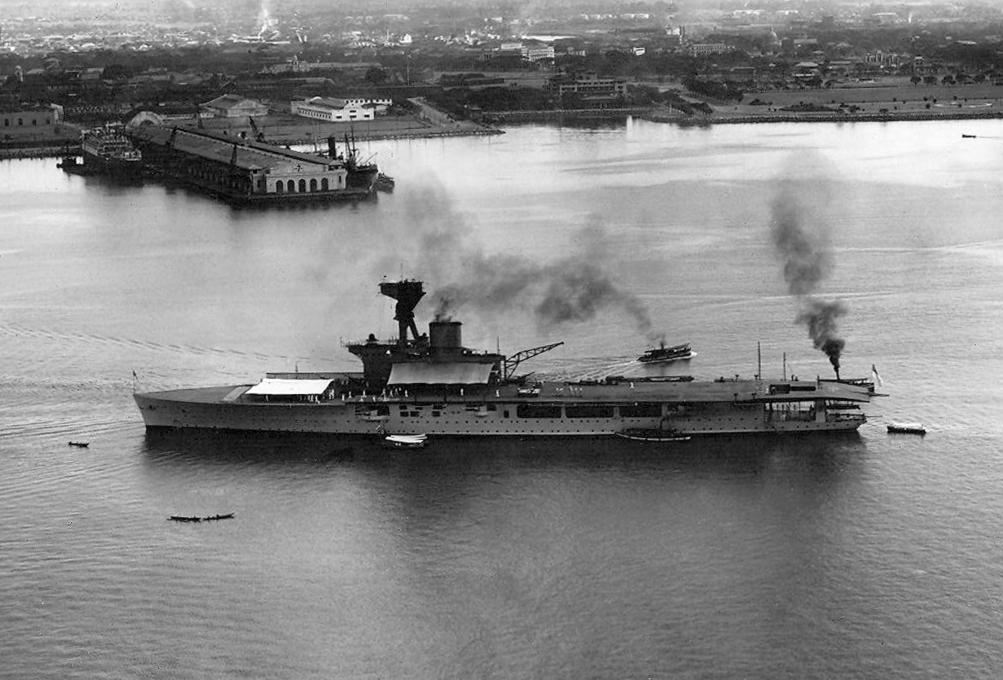
HMS Hermes at Honolulu, 1924

Hermes was laid down by Sir W. G. Armstrong-Whitworth and Company at Walker on the River Tyne on 15 January 1918 as the world's first purpose-designed aircraft carrier, and was launched on 11 September 1919. She was christened by Mrs. A. Cooper, daughter of the First Lord of the Admiralty, Walter Long. The shipyard was scheduled to close at the end of 1919 and the Admiralty ordered the ship towed to Devonport, where she arrived in January 1920 for completion.

=== 1920s ===
Captain Arthur Stopford was appointed as the ship's commanding officer in February 1923 and the ship began her sea trials in August. After fitting-out, Hermes was commissioned on 19 February 1924 and later assigned to the Atlantic Fleet. She conducted flying trials with the Fairey IIID reconnaissance biplanes for the next several months. Hermes participated in the fleet review conducted by King George V on 26 July in Spithead. Afterwards she was refitted until November and then transferred to the Mediterranean Fleet. She arrived at Malta on 22 November and needed some repairs to fix storm damage suffered en route. At this time the ship embarked No. 403 Flight with Fairey Flycatcher fighters and 441 Flight with Fairey IIIDs. Hermes conducted flying exercises with Eagle and the rest of the Mediterranean Fleet in early 1925 before she began a seven-week refit in Malta on 27 March, then sailed for Portsmouth where she arrived on 29 May after her aircraft had flown ashore.

Hermes sailed for the China Station on 17 June with 403 and 441 Flights aboard, but made a lengthy pause en route in the Mediterranean during which Captain Stopford was replaced by Captain C. P. Talbot. She arrived at Hong Kong on 10 August 1925. The ship made her first foreign port visit to Amoy in November. Hermes returned to the Mediterranean in early 1926 and was refitted at Malta between April and June. 441 Flight was transferred to Eagle at this time in exchange for 440 Flight which flew aboard in September. 442 Flight also joined the ship at this time; both flights were equipped with Fairey IIIs. The ship exercised with the Mediterranean Fleet after her refit was completed and Captain R. Elliot relieved Captain Talbot on 14 August. Hermes returned to Hong Kong on 11 October and conducted routine training until she sailed to the naval base at Weihaiwei on 27 July 1927 to escape the summer heat. The ship rendezvoused in September with Argus, which was to replace her on the China Station. Before she departed the area, however, both ships attacked the pirate base at Bias Bay and their fleet of junks and sampans. Hermes reached the United Kingdom on 26 October and began a refit at Chatham Dockyard at the beginning of November. One of her 4-inch guns was removed at this time. Sometime after this refit, the ship was provided with two single 1.57-inch (40 mm) 2-pounder "pom-pom" AA guns.

Captain Eliot was relieved by Captain G. Hopwood on 2 December and the ship sailed for the China Station on 21 January 1928. The Fairey IIIDs of 440 Flight had been replaced by IIIFs, and the ship kept the same three flights for this deployment. En route to Hong Kong, Hermes stopped at Bangkok, Siam, in March for four days and was inspected by King Rama VII. She reached Hong Kong on 18 March, relieving Argus. The ship spent a month in the port of Yantai in May and then the following three weeks in Weihaiwei. While visiting Qinhuangdao in July, one of her Fairey IIIF seaplanes made a forced landing outside the port; the Italian destroyer Muggia rescued the pilot and towed the aircraft back to the carrier. During the rest of the year, the ship visited Shanghai, Manila, as well as Kudat and Jesselton in Borneo. She began a refit in Hong Kong in January 1929 and Captain J. D. Campbell assumed command on 28 March. After refit was completed in April, Hermes conducted flying training before sailing up the Yangtze River to visit Nanjing the following month. Afterwards she spent the next four months at Weihaiwei. She made visits to Qingdao and Japan before returning to Hong Kong on 29 October where she remained for the rest of the year.

=== 1930s ===
On 28 January 1930, Hermes transported the British Minister to China, Sir Miles Lampson, to Nanjing for talks with the Chinese Government over the Japanese invasion of Manchuria and she remained there until she sailed downriver to Shanghai on 2 March. By the end of the month, the carrier was back in Hong Kong and remained there until June when she returned to Weihaiwei for her annual summer visit. The ship briefly returned to Hong Kong before departing for Great Britain on 7 August. Hermes reached Portsmouth on 23 September, but remained there only six days before transferring to Sheerness. Captain E. J. G. MacKinnon relieved Captain Campbell there on 2 October. She was given a brief refit at Chatham Dockyard before sailing for the China Station. The ship had aboard only 403 and 440 Flights on this deployment and transported six Blackburn Ripons to deliver to Malta and HMS Eagle. Hermes departed Portsmouth on 12 November and reached Hong Kong on 2 January 1931. En route to her summer refuge at Weihaiwei, the ship received a report on 9 June that the submarine Poseidon had been sunk there while on exercise. Captain MacKinnon took command of the rescue effort when Hermes arrived at the accident site an hour afterwards. Eight of the submarine's crewmen managed to escape through the forward torpedo hatch, but only six of those reached the surface where they were picked up and treated in Hermes's sickbay; two of those six subsequently died.

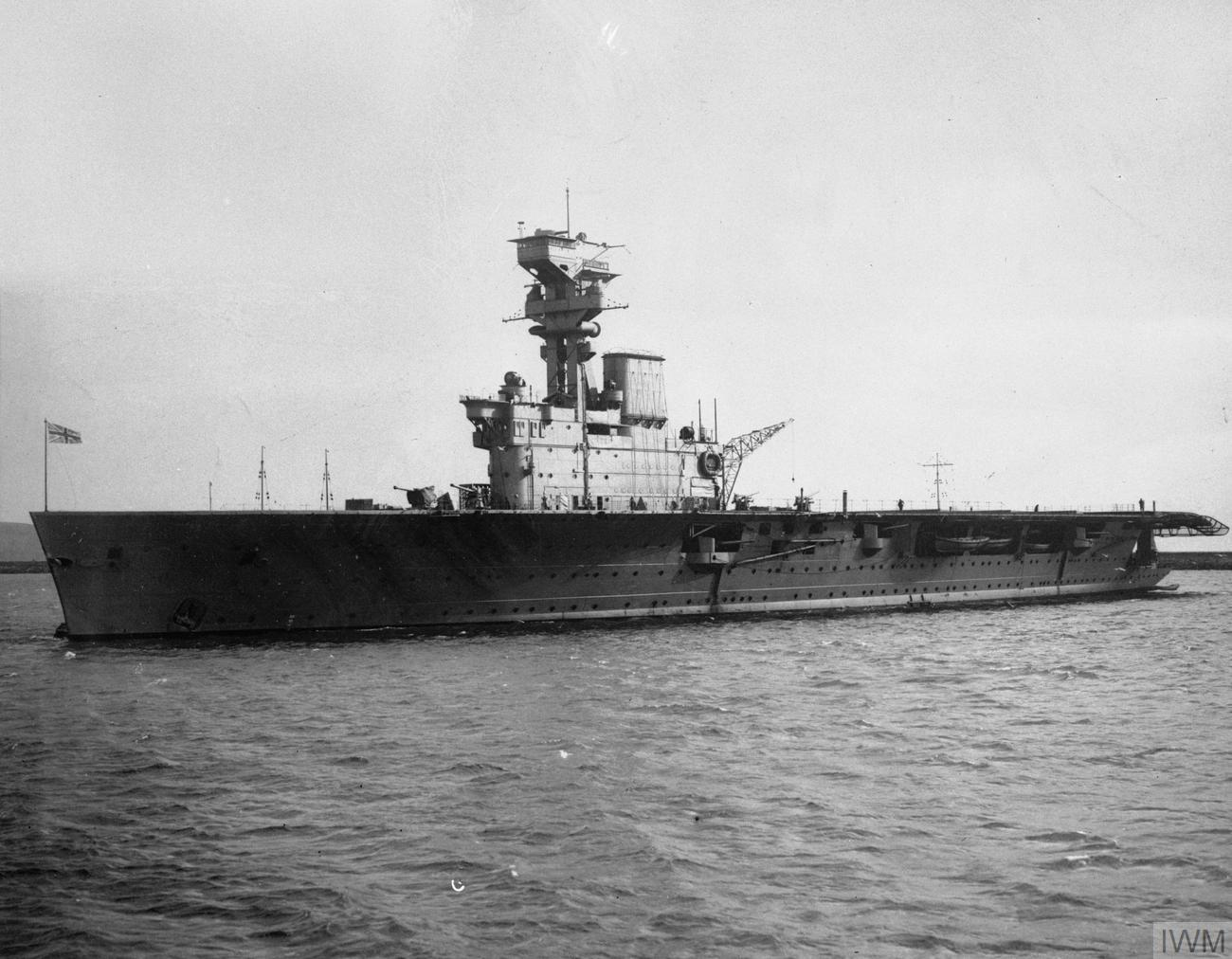
Hermes in 1938

The ship remained at Weihaiwei until the end of August when she sailed up the Yangtze River for Hankou. She reached the inland port on 5 September and dispatched armed guards to put down unrest on several British-owned merchant ships. Her primary purpose, though, was to aid the Chinese government's survey of the massive flooding in the area. Charles Lindbergh and his wife, Anne Morrow Lindbergh, were also in the city to survey the flooding with their Lockheed Sirius float-plane and they were invited to use the carrier as their base. Unfortunately, their aircraft was flipped on the morning of 2 October by a strong current as it was being hoisted back into the water by Hermes's crane. They were quickly rescued by a boat from the carrier, but their aircraft was damaged. Captain MacKinnon offered to take them and their aircraft to Shanghai where it could be repaired and the ship departed the next day. She remained in Shanghai until 2 November, when she sailed for Hong Kong. Hermes received a distress message on 3 November from a Japanese merchantman, SS Ryinjin Maru, that had run aground on the Tan Rocks near mainland China at the mouth of the Taiwan Strait. The ship managed to rescue nine crew members before she was relieved by the Japanese destroyer Nashi and could proceed to Hong Kong. She reached the city on 7 November and remained in the area until April 1932.

Captain MacKinnon took sick the next month and he was relieved by Captain W. B. Mackenzie on 25 February. After a short refit, the carrier, escorted by the destroyer Whitehall, made a brief visit to Amoy in late April before sailing for Weihaiwei where she stayed until 17 September. On that day, Hermes sailed for the Japanese city of Nagasaki and then spent four weeks in Shanghai. The ship did not return to Hong Kong until 28 October and spent the next few months there. In January 1933, the carrier visited the Philippines for several weeks before returning to Hong Kong where she was given a brief refit. After short visits to Qingdao and Weihaiwei, Hermes departed Hong Kong in mid-June for Great Britain. She reached Sheerness on 22 July, but the ship was transferred shortly afterwards to Chatham Dockyard and opened to the public during Navy Week in early August. She sailed the next month for Devonport Dockyard for a thorough refit. Transverse arresting gear was fitted and her machinery was thoroughly overhauled. Sometime in 1932, the two single 2-pounders were replaced by two quadruple .50-calibre Mark III machine gun mounts.

Captain the Honourable G. Fraser was appointed on 15 August 1934 as the new commanding officer and the ship began trials of the new equipment in early November. At the same time the nine Fairey Seal torpedo bombers of 824 Squadron joined the ship. Hermes left Portsmouth on 18 November for the China Station and arrived at Hong Kong on 4 January 1935. The Hawker Osprey reconnaissance biplanes of 803 Squadron were transferred aboard from Eagle before that ship left Hong Kong. Pirates captured a British-owned merchant ship, SS Tungchow, with 90 British and American children on board on 29 January and Hermes was ordered to search for the ship when she failed to arrive at Yantai at her scheduled time. Three Seals spotted her in Bias Bay on 1 February and the pirates abandoned the ship when it was found, leaving the passengers unharmed. Hermes remained in the vicinity of Hong Kong until mid-May when she steamed to Weihaiwei. There she remained until 12 September when the Admiralty decided to transfer her to Singapore where she was closer to East Africa in case a military response to the Italian invasion of Ethiopia was deemed necessary. (Note: Tensions between the United Kingdom and Italy were high as a result of the earlier Abyssinia Crisis and the United Kingdom considered intervening against the Italians, but ultimately chose to do nothing.) The ship arrived on 19 September and remained in the area for the next five months.

The ship's aircraft were detailed to search for the missing Lady Southern Cross of Sir Charles Kingsford Smith when it failed to arrive at Singapore on 8 November during an attempt to set a new speed record between Britain and Australia. No sign was found of either the aircraft or its crew despite a month-long search. Hermes returned to Hong Kong at the beginning of March 1936 before beginning a tour of Japan on 21 April, escorted by the destroyers Duncan and Delight. She summered at Weihaiwei and did not return to Hong Kong until the end of October. For most of January 1937, the carrier, accompanied by the heavy cruiser Dorsetshire and the destroyers Duncan and Diana, toured the Dutch East Indies. The ship's torpedo bombers practised torpedo attacks on the cruisers Cumberland and Dorsetshire in February, working with the Royal Air Force's torpedo bombers based at RAF Seletar, Singapore. Hermes left Singapore on 17 March, leaving 803 Squadron behind, and reached Plymouth on 3 May 1937. Following the Coronation Fleet Review at Spithead on 20 May for King George VI, she was assigned to the Reserve Fleet. On 16 July 1938, Hermes was transferred from the Reserve Fleet and became a training ship at Devonport.

Plans were made in 1937 to replace Hermes's three single 4-inch guns with two twin 4-inch anti-aircraft guns, one forward and another aft of the island, as well as two octuple 2-pounder mounts. A single High-Angle Control System would have been fitted to control these guns, but the dockyard was overwhelmed with other work and could not begin to design the changes until July 1938. They were scheduled to be installed between September and December 1939, but the beginning of the war intervened and nothing was done. The ship's petrol storage was to be increased to 13,000 imperial gallons (59,000 L; 16,000 US gal) in April 1940, but this also does not seem to have occurred.

=== World War II ===
The ship was given a brief refit in early August 1939 and Captain F. E. P. Hutton assumed command on 23 August. She was recommissioned the following day, and 12 Fairey Swordfish torpedo bombers of 814 Squadron flew aboard on 1 September. Hermes conducted anti-submarine patrols in mid-September in an effort to find and destroy U-boats in the Western Approaches. On 18 September, the day after the fleet carrier Courageous was sunk on one such patrol, Hermes located a submarine, but attacks by her escorting destroyers, Isis and Imogen, were ineffective. The carrier was then ordered to return to Devonport where she was fitted with degaussing gear during another brief refit. On 7 October, the ship rendezvoused with the French battleship Strasbourg and they arrived at Dakar in French West Africa on 16 October. Designated as Force X, they began searching for German ships in the Atlantic on 25 October. Hermes performed these patrols with no sightings until the end of December when she escorted a convoy to Britain where she could be refitted from 9 January to 10 February 1940; the ship then returned to Dakar and resumed her patrols for German commerce raiders and blockade runners.

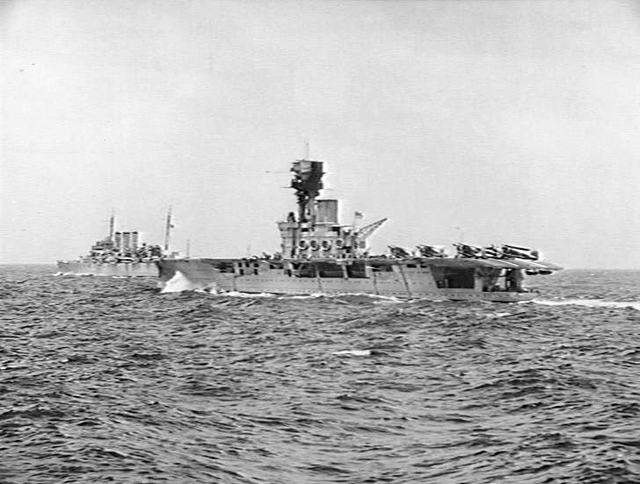
Hermes and HMS Dorsetshire escorting a convoy in June 1940

Captain Richard F. J. Onslow relieved Captain Hutton on 25 May and Hermes continued her fruitless patrols. After returning from one such patrol on 29 June, the ship was ordered to leave harbour only nine hours after her arrival and to begin a blockade of Dakar as the Governor of French Senegal had declared the colony's allegiance to the Vichy French regime. On the night of 7/8 July, a boat from Hermes attempted to drop four depth charges underneath the French battleship Richelieu's stern in conjunction with a torpedo attack by the Swordfish of 814 Squadron. The boat was successful in reaching the French ship, but the depth charges failed to detonate. The torpedo attack was more successful as one of the battleship's propellers was damaged. French aircraft attacked the British forces several times in retaliation, but without success.

While returning to Freetown after the attack, Hermes accidentally rammed the armed merchant cruiser HMS Corfu during a rainstorm in the dark on 10 July. The impact injured three of the carrier's crew, one of whom subsequently died of his injuries, but no one from Corfu's crew was injured. The two ships were locked together so that Corfu's crew could walk from one to the other when Captain Onslow ordered most of her crew to be evacuated onto Hermes. They were pulled apart by a combination of the carrier's turbines at full speed astern and blowing of ballast tanks on board Corfu to lighten that ship forward. Hermes had crumpled the forward 30 feet (9.1 m) of her bow, mostly above water, and was able to proceed to Freetown at 12 knots (22 km/h; 14 mph), but Corfu had to be towed stern first to Freetown where she arrived three days later. The carrier joined a convoy to South Africa on 5 August and began repairs at Simonstown 12 days later. The repairs were completed on 2 November and the ship arrived back at Freetown on 29 November after working up.

The ship was joined by the light cruiser Dragon on 2 December to search for German commerce raiders in the South Atlantic. They mostly operated from Saint Helena during the month and were later joined by the armed merchant cruiser Pretoria Castle to search for the pocket battleship Admiral Scheer, without success. The force sailed for Simonstown on 31 December and Hermes was dispatched to search off the South African coast for Vichy French blockade runners. One such ship was spotted on 26 January, but she returned to Madagascar. On 4 February, the ship headed north to rendezvous with the heavy cruisers Shropshire and Hawkins to blockade the Somali port of Kismayo which was under siege by Commonwealth forces. Hawkins captured three Italian merchantmen and Hermes captured one on 12 February.

On 22 February, the carrier was one of the ships tasked to search for Admiral Scheer after she was spotted by an aircraft from the light cruiser Glasgow, but the pocket battleship successfully broke contact. Hermes arrived in Colombo, Ceylon, on 4 March and continued to search for Axis shipping. She was sent to the Persian Gulf in April to support British operations in Basra, Iraq, and remained there until mid-June when she returned to patrolling the Indian Ocean between Ceylon and the Seychelles Islands. The ship continued to patrol until 19 November when she arrived in Simonstown for a refit that was not completed until 31 January 1942. Hermes was assigned to the Eastern Fleet and arrived at Colombo on 14 February. She put to sea on 19 February to receive the Swordfish of 814 Squadron and to rendezvous with the destroyer HMAS Vampire to conduct an anti-submarine patrol. The squadron was disembarked on 25 February after the ships arrived in Trincomalee Harbour. The two ships were ordered to Fremantle, Australia, in mid-March to join the Allied naval forces headquartered there, but they were recalled after three days and assigned to Force B of the Eastern Fleet.

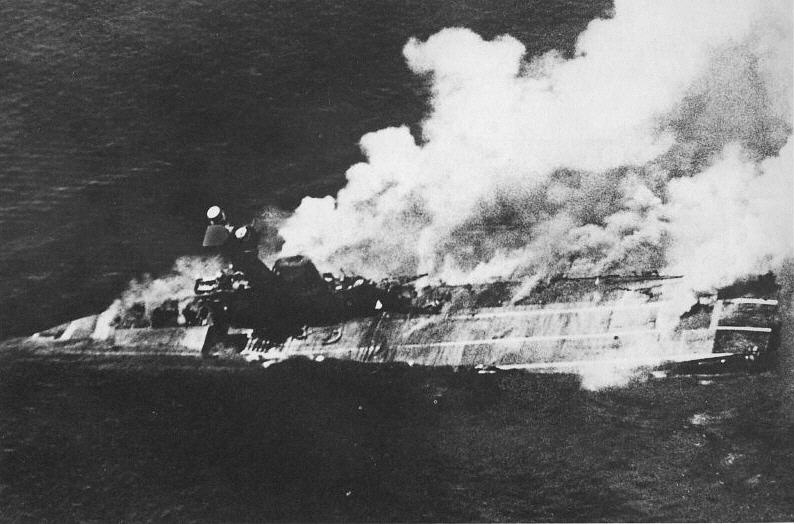
A close-up view of Hermes sinking

After the raid on Colombo by the Japanese aircraft carriers on 5 April, Hermes and Vampire were sent to Trincomalee to prepare for Operation Ironclad, the British invasion of Madagascar, and 814 Squadron was sent ashore. After advance warning of a Japanese air raid on 9 April 1942, they left Trincomalee and sailed south down the Ceylon coast before it arrived. They were spotted off Batticaloa, however, by a Japanese reconnaissance plane from the battleship Haruna. The British intercepted the spot report and ordered the ships to return to Trincomalee with the utmost dispatch and attempted to provide fighter cover for them.

The Japanese launched 85 Aichi D3A dive bombers, escorted by nine Mitsubishi A6M Zero fighters, at the two ships. At least 32 attacked them and sank them in quick order despite the arrival of six Fairey Fulmar II fighters of No. 273 Squadron RAF. Another six Fulmars from 803 and 806 Squadrons arrived after Hermes had already sunk. The rest of the Japanese aircraft attacked other ships further north, sinking the RFA Athelstone of 5,571 gross register tonnage (GRT), her escort, the corvette Hollyhock, the oil tanker SS British Sergeant and the Norwegian ship SS Norviken of 2,924 GRT.

Hermes sank at coordinates 7°35′28.392″N 82°05′55.089″E with the loss of 307 men, including Captain Onslow. Vampire's captain and seven crewmen were also killed. Most of the survivors of the attack were picked up by the hospital ship Vita. Japanese losses to all causes were four D3As lost and five more damaged, while two Fulmars were shot down.

==== Decoy Hermes ====
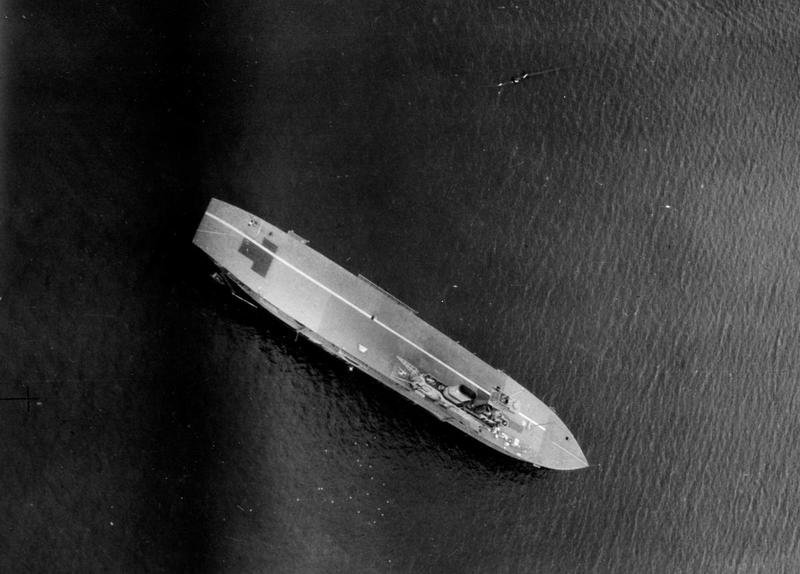
Aerial view of SS Mamari III disguised as Hermes with a false flight deck and island

The merchant ship SS Mamari III was converted to resemble Hermes as a decoy ship to confuse the Axis and was redesignated as Fleet Tender C. On 4 June 1941, when she was sailing down the east coast of England to Chatham Dockyard in Kent to be converted back into a cargo ship, the decoy Hermes hit a submerged wreck off Norfolk during a German aerial attack. Before she could be refloated, she was crippled by German E-boats and abandoned in place.
