= SS British Sergeant =

- British Sergeant in 1922

History

United Kingdom
- Name: SS British Sergeant
- Owner: British Tanker Company
- Builder: Palmers Shipbuilding and Iron Company, Newcastle-Upon-Tyne
- Yard number: 931
- Launched: 27 February 1922
- Completed: August 1922
- Identification: United Kingdom Official Number: 146647
- Fate: Sunk on 9 April 1942

General characteristics
- Type: Oil tanker
- Tonnage: 5,868 GRT
- Length: 122.1 m (400 ft 7 in)
- Beam: 16.5 m (54 ft 2 in)
- Depth: 10 m (32 ft 10 in)
- Propulsion: 2 Steam turbines, single shaft, 1 screw
- Speed: 10 knots (19 km/h; 12 mph)

SS British Sergeant was a British tanker built by Palmers Shipbuilding and Iron Company in 1922 and operated by the British Tanker Company. She was sunk during World War II on 9 April 1942 during the Indian Ocean raid, off Batticaloa, Ceylon (today Sri Lanka), by Imperial Japanese Navy aircraft. Today she lies at a depth of 24m and makes a great dive site for wreck enthusiasts.
