= Kawasaki-type oiler =

Type of oiler from Japan

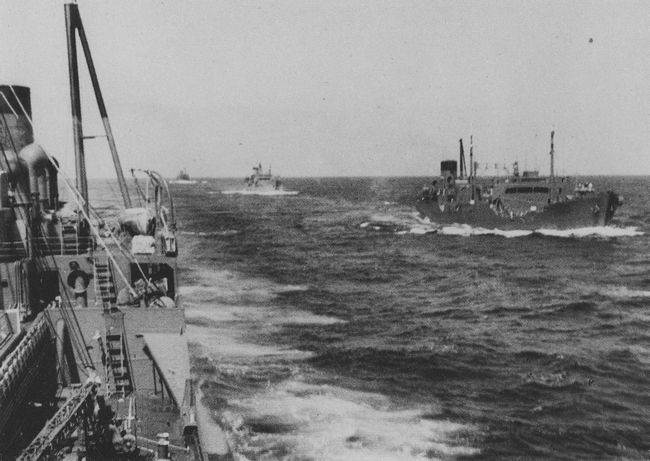
- Kyokutō Maru (left), Kokuyō Maru, Nippon Maru and Shinkoku Maru (right) on 1 December 1941

Class overview
- Name: Kawasaki-type oilers; Tōa Maru class; Tatekawa Maru class; Nisshō Maru class; Kuroshio Maru class; Akatsuki Maru class
- Builders: Kawasaki Shipbuilding Corporation; Harima Zōsen Corporation; Mitsubishi Heavy Industries
- Operators: Asano Bussan; Chūgai Line; Iino Lines; Japan Line; Kawasaki Line; Kōbe Pier; Kokuyō Line; Mitsu Line; Nippon Suisan; Nittō Mining; Nihon Tanker; Yamashita Line; Imperial Japanese Navy; Imperial Japanese Army
- Preceded by: Fujisan Maru
- Succeeded by: Type 1TL wartime standard ship
- Cost: Tōa Maru: 2,600,000 JPY
- Built: 1933 – 1943
- In commission: 1934 – 1964
- Planned: 17
- Completed: 17
- Lost: 17
- Retired: (1)

General characteristics
- Type: Oiler
- Displacement: approx. 10,000 long tons (10,160 t)
- Length: around 152 m (498 ft 8 in) Lpp
- Beam: around 20.0 m (65 ft 7 in)
- Draught: around 11.4 m (37 ft 5 in)
- Propulsion: 1 × diesel, single shaft, around 10,000 bhp; or boiler and turbine
- Speed: around 20 knots (23 mph; 37 km/h)
- Armament: (example); Shinkoku Maru, 1941; 2 × 150 mm (5.9 in) naval guns; 2 × 76.2 mm (3.00 in) AA guns; 2 × 7.7 mm machine guns; Gen'yo Maru, 1941; 2 × 76.2 mm (3.00 in) AA guns; 2 × Type 96 25 mm AA guns; Itsukushima Maru, 1944; 1 × 120 mm (4.7 in) naval gun; 16 × Type 96 25 mm AA guns; 18 × depth charges; 1 × Type 93 hydrophone; Kyokutō Maru, 1944; 2 × 120 mm (4.7 in) AA guns; 16 × Type 96 25 mm AA guns; Nichiei Maru, 1944; 2 × 120 mm (4.7 in) AA guns; 16 × Type 96 25 mm AA guns; 12 × depth charges; 1 × Type 93 hydrophone

The Kawasaki-type oiler (川崎型油槽船,, Kawasaki-gata Yusōsen) was a type of oiler from Japan, serving during the 1930s and World War II. They do not have an official class name. Therefore, this article uses common class names. And, this type has some variants. This article handles them collectively.

== Background ==
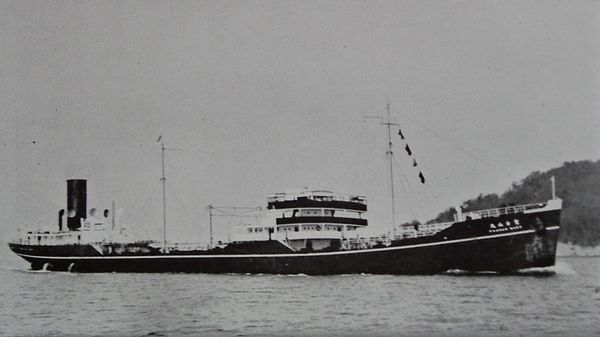
Iino Lines Fujisan Maru

- The London Naval Treaty forced shrinkage of a budget to the Imperial Japanese Navy (IJN). And it meant the cooling of the Japanese shipbuilding industry worlds. The Great Depression accelerated it more. The IJN wanted to update their Notoro-class oilers and Ondo-class oilers, because these oilers were not able to chase the aircraft carrier.
- In 1929, the IJN decided their combat ship (battleship, aircraft carrier, cruiser, destroyer, submarine and torpedo boat) fuel only to heavy crude oil. And, the IJN was paid a grant to newly build large/high-speed tankers.
- In 1931, two marine transportation companies built the tankers which the IJN wanted. One was the 9,900 tons/17.5 knot Teiyō Maru, the other the 9,500 tons/18.8 knots Fujisan Maru.
- The IJN was satisfied by Fujisan Maru. The IJN recommended building of the improved Fujisan Maru class tanker.

== Construction ==
- In 1932, the Iino Kaiun Kaisha (飯野海運,, Iino Lines) ordered two tankers Tōa Maru and Kyokutō Maru from the Kawasaki Shipbuilding Corporation. In total 17 tankers were built with the same basic drawings, until 1943.
- All sisters participated in World War II. However, they were not able to survive at all.

== Ships in classes ==
=== Tōa Maru class ===
- This is the first production model of the Kawasaki-type tankers. Their success gave courage to other steamship companies.

Subsidy #	Name	Builder	Laid down	Launched	Completed	Owner
13	Tōa Maru (東亜丸)	Kawasaki, Kōbe Shipyard	24 April 1933	2 April 1934	23 June 1934	Iino Lines
18	Kyokutō Maru (極東丸, 旭東丸)	Kawasaki, Kōbe Shipyard	25 November 1933	11 October 1934	15 December 1934	Iino Lines

=== Tatekawa Maru class ===
- The second production model. They were built according to the same Tōa Maru class drawings. However, their details were different by the steamship company which they placed an order with (example: Nippon Maru removed one dry cargo hold). Narrow sense of the Kawasaki-type tanker was until the Kyūei Maru. Kyūei Maru was equipped for surplus stocks of the Argentina Maru machinery.

Subsidy #	Name	Builder	Laid down	Launched	Completed	Owner
	Tatekawa Maru (建川丸)	Kawasaki, Kōbe Shipyard	20 October 1934	20 April 1935	30 June 1935	Kawasaki Line
	Nippon Maru (日本丸)	Kawasaki, Kōbe Shipyard	18 October 1935	24 April 1936	30 June 1936	Yamashita Line
	Tōhō Maru (東邦丸)	Kawasaki, Kōbe Shipyard	1 May 1936	31 October 1936	24 December 1936	Iino Lines
101	Itsukushima Maru (厳島丸)	Kawasaki, Kōbe Shipyard	21 April 1937	4 September 1937	20 December 1937	Nippon Suisan
102	Gen'yō Maru (玄洋丸)	Kawasaki, Kōbe Shipyard	12 June 1937	30 December 1937	28 April 1938	Asano Bussan
104	Nichiei Maru (日栄丸)	Kawasaki, Kōbe Shipyard	4 September 1937	15 April 1938	30 June 1938	Nittō Mining
	Tōei Maru (東栄丸)	Kawasaki, Kōbe Shipyard	15 April 1938	24 October 1938	21 February 1939	Nittō Mining
106	Kokuyō Maru (国洋丸)	Kawasaki, Kōbe Shipyard	17 June 1938	26 December 1938	16 May 1939	Kokuyō Line
	Ken'yō Maru (健洋丸)	Kawasaki, Kōbe Shipyard	29 June 1938	6 April 1939	28 October 1939	Kokuyō Line
107	Shinkoku Maru (神国丸)	Kawasaki, Kōbe Shipyard	25 October 1938	13 December 1939	28 February 1940	Kōbe Pier
	Kyūei Maru (久栄丸)	Kawasaki, Kōbe Shipyard	20 November 1942	3 June 1943	6 September 1943	Nittō Mining

=== Nisshō Maru class ===
- One of the variants of the Kawasaki-type tankers. Mitsubishi used many curves to reduce her air friction strength.

Subsidy #	Name	Builder	Laid down	Launched	Completed	Owner
103	Nisshō Maru (日章丸)	Mitsubishi, Yokohama Shipyard	10 August 1937	13 June 1938	29 November 1938	Shōwa Shipping

=== Kuroshio Maru class ===
- One of the variants of the Kawasaki-type tankers. Kuroshio Maru was equipped with a La-Mont boiler. Her design was used for the Type 1TL wartime standard ship.

Subsidy #	Name	Builder	Laid down	Launched	Completed	Owner
105	Kuroshio Maru (黒潮丸)	Harima Zōsen, Aioi Factory	21 January 1938	8 December 1938	28 February 1939	Chūgai Line

=== Akatsuki Maru class ===
- One of the variants of the Kawasaki-type tankers. The Harima Zōsen used the Sulzer diesel.

Subsidy #	Name	Builder	Laid down	Launched	Completed	Owner
108	Akatsuki Maru (あかつき丸)	Harima Zōsen, Aioi Factory	21 June 1937	20 August 1938	31 October 1938	Japan Line
	Akebono Maru (あけぼの丸)	Harima Zōsen, Aioi Factory	25 January 1938	10 June 1939	15 August 1939	Japan Line

== Service ==
Name	Career (extract), fate	
Name	Date	Contents
Tōa Maru	1934–1941	Sailed for the import oil into Japan (67 times).
Tōa Maru	1 September 1941	Enlisted by the IJN. On 20 September, classified to auxiliary oiler.
Tōa Maru	1 December 1941	Assigned to the 6th Fleet.
Tōa Maru	5 April 1942	Assigned to the Combined Fleet.
Tōa Maru	21 May 1942	Entry to the 1st Fleet.
Tōa Maru	25 November 1943	Sunk by USS Searaven at north of Pohnpei 08°30′N 158°00′E.
Tōa Maru	5 January 1944	Removed from naval ship lists, and discharged.
Kyokutō Maru; Ōyashima Maru (大八州丸); California Maru (かりほるにあ丸)	1934–1938	Sailed for the import oil into Japan (35 times).
Kyokutō Maru; Ōyashima Maru (大八州丸); California Maru (かりほるにあ丸)	1 July 1938	Enlisted by the IJN. On 7 July, classified to auxiliary fleet oiler, and assigned to the Combined Fleet.
Kyokutō Maru; Ōyashima Maru (大八州丸); California Maru (かりほるにあ丸)	18 November 1941	Entry to the 1st Air Fleet.
Kyokutō Maru; Ōyashima Maru (大八州丸); California Maru (かりほるにあ丸)	15 January 1942	Renamed Ōyashima Maru.
Kyokutō Maru; Ōyashima Maru (大八州丸); California Maru (かりほるにあ丸)	5 May 1944	Assigned to the 1st Mobile Fleet.
Kyokutō Maru; Ōyashima Maru (大八州丸); California Maru (かりほるにあ丸)	1 August 1944	Assigned to the Combined Fleet.
Kyokutō Maru; Ōyashima Maru (大八州丸); California Maru (かりほるにあ丸)	6 September 1944	Entry to the Kamoi Convoy (Singapore-Manila). On 20 September, arrived at Manila.
Kyokutō Maru; Ōyashima Maru (大八州丸); California Maru (かりほるにあ丸)	21 September 1944	Heavy damaged by aircraft at Manila Bay, later sunk in shallow water.
Kyokutō Maru; Ōyashima Maru (大八州丸); California Maru (かりほるにあ丸)	10 March 1945	Removed from naval ship lists, and discharged.
Kyokutō Maru; Ōyashima Maru (大八州丸); California Maru (かりほるにあ丸)	1951	Salvaged and sold to Nihon Tanker.
Kyokutō Maru; Ōyashima Maru (大八州丸); California Maru (かりほるにあ丸)	5 September 1952	Repairs were completed, and renamed California Maru.
Kyokutō Maru; Ōyashima Maru (大八州丸); California Maru (かりほるにあ丸)	21 July 1964	Retired.
Tatekawa Maru	1935–1941	Sailed for the import oil into Japan, many times.
Tatekawa Maru	20 December 1941	Enlisted by the IJN.
Tatekawa Maru	1 September 1943	Classified to auxiliary oiler, and assigned to the Ministry of the Navy.
Tatekawa Maru	9 May 1944	Assigned to the 1st Mobile Fleet.
Tatekawa Maru	24 May 1944	Sunk by USS Gurnard at east of Mindanao 05°45′N 125°43′E.
Tatekawa Maru	10 July 1944	Removed from naval ship lists. On 20 July, discharged.
Nippon Maru	1936–1941	Sailed for the import oil into Japan, many times.
Nippon Maru	7 September 1941	Enlisted by the IJN. On 20 September, classified to auxiliary oiler, and assigned to the Combined Fleet.
Nippon Maru	18 November 1941	Entry to the 1st Air Fleet.
Nippon Maru	12 May 1943	Entry to the Northeast Area Fleet.
Nippon Maru	14 January 1944	Sunk by USS Scamp at southwest of Woleai 05°02′N 140°03′E.
Nippon Maru	10 March 1944	Removed from naval ship lists, and discharged.
Tōhō Maru	1936–1941	Sailed for the import oil into Japan (51 times).
Tōhō Maru	20 August 1941	Enlisted by the IJN. On 20 September, classified to auxiliary oiler, and assigned to the Combined Fleet.
Tōhō Maru	26 November 1941	Entry to the 1st Air Fleet.
Tōhō Maru	27 May 1942	Entry to the 4th Carrier Division.
Tōhō Maru	29 March 1943	Sunk by USS Gudgeon at east-northeast of Samarinda 00°00′N 118°18′E.
Tōhō Maru	1 May 1943	Removed from naval ship lists, and discharged.
Itsukushima Maru	1937–1941	Accompanied to fleet of whalers.
Itsukushima Maru	22 November 1941	Enlisted by the IJN.
Itsukushima Maru	1 September 1943	Classified to auxiliary oiler, and assigned to the Ministry of the Navy.
Itsukushima Maru	9 May 1944	Assigned to the 1st Mobile Fleet.
Itsukushima Maru	20 September 1944	Assigned to the Combined Fleet.
Itsukushima Maru	20 September 1944	Entry to the 2nd Fleet.
Itsukushima Maru	27 October 1944	Heavy damaged by USS Bergall at southwest of Balambangan Island 07°17′N 116°45′E. On 31 October, sunk.
Itsukushima Maru	10 December 1944	Removed from naval ship lists, and discharged.
Gen'yō Maru	1938–1941	Sailed for the import oil into Japan, many times.
Gen'yō Maru	2 November 1941	Enlisted by the IJN. On 10 December, classified to auxiliary oiler, and assigned to the 3rd Fleet.
Gen'yō Maru	10 March 1942	Assigned to the 2nd Southern Expeditionary Fleet.
Gen'yō Maru	25 August 1942	Assigned to the Combined Fleet.
Gen'yō Maru	5 May 1944	Assigned to the 1st Mobile Fleet.
Gen'yō Maru	20 June 1944	Sunk during the Battle of the Philippine Sea at north-northwest of Palau 15°35′N 133°30′E.
Gen'yō Maru	10 August 1944	Removed from naval ship lists, and discharged.
Nichiei Maru	1938–1941	Sailed for the import oil into Japan, many times.
Nichiei Maru	31 October 1941	Enlisted by the IJN. On 10 November, classified to auxiliary oiler, and assigned to the Combined Fleet.
Nichiei Maru	August 1942	Assigned to the Southeast Area Fleet.
Nichiei Maru	25 December 1943	Assigned to the Combined Fleet.
Nichiei Maru	5 May 1944	Assigned to the 1st Mobile Fleet.
Nichiei Maru	23 July 1944	Assigned to the Combined Fleet.
Nichiei Maru	16 October 1944	Assigned to the 2nd Fleet.
Nichiei Maru	3 January 1945	Heavy damaged by USS Besugo at north of Kuantan. On 7 January, sunk at 06°45′N 102°55′E.
Nichiei Maru	10 March 1945	Removed from naval ship lists, and discharged.
Tōei Maru	1939–1940	Sailed for the import oil into Japan, several times.
Tōei Maru	23 December 1940	Enlisted by the IJN. On 26 December, classified to auxiliary oiler.
Tōei Maru	1 July 1941	Classified to auxiliary fleet oiler.
Tōei Maru	15 October 1941	Classified to auxiliary oiler, and assigned to the Combined Fleet.
Tōei Maru	18 November 1941	Entry to the 1st Air Fleet.
Tōei Maru	18 January 1943	Sunk by USS Silversides off Truk 06°19′N 150°15′E.
Tōei Maru	1 April 1943	Removed from naval ship lists, and discharged.
Kokuyō Maru	1939–1940	Sailed for the import oil into Japan, several times.
Kokuyō Maru	16 November 1940	Enlisted by the IJN. On 26 December, classified to auxiliary oiler.
Kokuyō Maru	15 June 1941	Classified to auxiliary fleet oiler.
Kokuyō Maru	15 October 1941	Classified to auxiliary oiler, and assigned to the Combined Fleet.
Kokuyō Maru	18 November 1941	Entry to the 1st Air Fleet.
Kokuyō Maru	5 May 1944	Assigned to the 1st Mobile Fleet.
Kokuyō Maru	30 July 1944	Sunk by USS Bonefish at east of Sandakan 06°07′N 120°00′E.
Kokuyō Maru	10 September 1944	Removed from naval ship lists, and discharged.
Ken'yō Maru	1939–1941	Sailed for the import oil into Japan, several times.
Ken'yō Maru	17 August 1941	Enlisted by the IJN. On 5 September, classified to auxiliary oiler, and assigned to the Combined Fleet.
Ken'yō Maru	18 November 1941	Entry to the 1st Air Fleet.
Ken'yō Maru	10 August 1942	Entry to the 3rd Fleet.
Ken'yō Maru	14 January 1944	Sunk by USS Guardfish at southeast of Yap 05°23′N 141°32′E.
Ken'yō Maru	10 March 1944	Removed from naval ship lists, and discharged.
Shinkoku Maru	1940–1941	Sailed for the import oil into Japan, several times.
Shinkoku Maru	18 August 1941	Enlisted by the IJN. On 5 September, classified to auxiliary oiler, and assigned to the Combined Fleet.
Shinkoku Maru	18 November 1941	Entry to the 1st Air Fleet.
Shinkoku Maru	17 February 1944	Sunk during the Operation Hailstone.
Shinkoku Maru	31 March 1944	Removed from naval ship lists, and discharged.
Kyūei Maru	15 October 1943	Enlisted by the IJN. Classified to auxiliary oiler, and assigned to the Yokosuka Naval District.
Kyūei Maru	25 October 1943	Assigned to the Ministry of the Navy.
Kyūei Maru	21 December 1943	Entry to the Hi-27 Convoy.
Kyūei Maru	27 December 1943	Sunk by USS Flying Fish at southeast of Kaohsiung 21°25′N 118°05′E.
Kyūei Maru	5 February 1944	Removed from naval ship lists, and discharged.
Nisshō Maru	1938–1941	Sailed for the import oil into Japan, many times.
Nisshō Maru	23 February 1942	Enlisted by the IJN. On 25 February, classified to auxiliary oiler.
Nisshō Maru	1 July 1942	Assigned to the Combined Fleet.
Nisshō Maru	25 February 1944	Sunk by USS Hoe at Bohol Sea 05°50′N 126°00′E.
Nisshō Maru	31 March 1944	Removed from naval ship lists, and discharged.
Kuroshio Maru	1939–1941	Sailed for the import oil into Japan, many times.
Kuroshio Maru	15 August 1941	Enlisted by the IJN. On 5 September, classified to auxiliary oiler.
Kuroshio Maru	10 January 1942	Assigned to the Ministry of the Navy.
Kuroshio Maru	20 March 1942	Removed from naval ship lists, and discharged.
Kuroshio Maru	September 1942	Allotted to the Imperial Japanese Army.
Kuroshio Maru	31 December 1944	Entry to the Hi-87 Convoy.
Kuroshio Maru	21 January 1945	Sunk by aircraft at Kaohsiung.
Akatsuki Maru	1938–1941	Sailed for the import oil into Japan, many times.
Akatsuki Maru	17 November 1941	Enlisted by the Navy.
Akatsuki Maru	29 May 1943	Sunk by USS Saury at northwest of Naha 27°40′N 125°55′E.
Akatsuki Maru	30 June 1943	Discharged.
Akebono Maru	1939–1941	Sailed for the import oil into Japan, many times.
Akebono Maru	1 December 1941	Enlisted by the IJN. On 7 December, classified to auxiliary oiler.
Akebono Maru	10 January 1942	Assigned to the Combined Fleet.
Akebono Maru	30 March 1944	Entry to the PaTa-07 Convoy.
Akebono Maru	31 March 1944	Heavy damaged by aircraft at Palau. Later scuttled.
Akebono Maru	10 May 1944	Removed from naval ship lists, and discharged.

== Characteristics ==
Name	Displacement (gross)	Length	Beam	Draught	Propulsion	Speed	Capacity
Tōa Maru	10,052 long tons (10,213 t)	160.2 m (525 ft 7 in) overall 152.4 m (500 ft 0 in) Lpp	19.8 m (65 ft 0 in)	11.2 m (36 ft 9 in)	1 × MAN/Kawasaki D8Z-70/120 diesel single shaft, 8,911 bhp	18.4 knots (21.2 mph; 34.1 km/h)	16,093 cubic meters oil 4 passengers
Kyokutō Maru (Ōyashima Maru)	10,051 long tons (10,212 t)	160.2 m (525 ft 7 in) overall 152.4 m (500 ft 0 in) Lpp	19.8 m (65 ft 0 in)	11.3 m (37 ft 1 in)	1 × MAN/Kawasaki D8Z-70/120 diesel single shaft, 8,963 bhp	18.9 knots (21.7 mph; 35.0 km/h)	16,100 cubic meters oil 8 passengers
Tatekawa Maru	10,091 long tons (10,253 t)	160.2 m (525 ft 7 in) overall 152.4 m (500 ft 0 in) Lpp	19.8 m (65 ft 0 in)	11.3 m (37 ft 1 in)	1 × MAN/Kawasaki D8Z-70/120 diesel single shaft, 10,658 bhp	19.9 knots (22.9 mph; 36.9 km/h)	
Nippon Maru	9,971 long tons (10,131 t)	160.2 m (525 ft 7 in) overall 152.4 m (500 ft 0 in) Lpp	19.8 m (65 ft 0 in)	11.3 m (37 ft 1 in)	1 × MAN/Kawasaki D8Z-70/120 diesel single shaft, 9,773 bhp	19.2 knots (22.1 mph; 35.6 km/h)	14,590 cubic meters oil 6 passengers
Tōhō Maru	9,997 long tons (10,157 t)	160.2 m (525 ft 7 in) overall 152.4 m (500 ft 0 in) Lpp	19.8 m (65 ft 0 in)	11.3 m (37 ft 1 in)	1 × MAN/Kawasaki D8Z-70/120 diesel single shaft, 9,903 bhp	20.1 knots (23.1 mph; 37.2 km/h)	
Itsukushima Maru	10,007 long tons (10,168 t)	160.2 m (525 ft 7 in) overall 152.4 m (500 ft 0 in) Lpp	19.8 m (65 ft 0 in)	11.3 m (37 ft 1 in)	1 × MAN/Kawasaki D8Z-70/120 diesel single shaft, 11,693 bhp	19.8 knots (22.8 mph; 36.7 km/h)	
Gen'yō Maru	10,018 long tons (10,179 t)	160.2 m (525 ft 7 in) overall 152.4 m (500 ft 0 in) Lpp	19.8 m (65 ft 0 in)	11.3 m (37 ft 1 in)	1 × MAN/Kawasaki D8Z-70/120 diesel single shaft, 11,100 bhp	19.7 knots (22.7 mph; 36.5 km/h)	
Nichiei Maru	10,020 long tons (10,181 t)	160.2 m (525 ft 7 in) overall 152.4 m (500 ft 0 in) Lpp	19.8 m (65 ft 0 in)	11.3 m (37 ft 1 in)	1 × MAN/Kawasaki D8Z-70/120 diesel single shaft, 11,570 bhp	20.0 knots (23.0 mph; 37.0 km/h)	
Tōei Maru	10,022 long tons (10,183 t)	160.2 m (525 ft 7 in) overall 152.4 m (500 ft 0 in) Lpp	19.8 m (65 ft 0 in)	11.3 m (37 ft 1 in)	1 × MAN/Kawasaki D8Z-70/120 diesel single shaft, 11,210 bhp	19.4 knots (22.3 mph; 35.9 km/h)	
Kokuyō Maru	10,026 long tons (10,187 t)	160.2 m (525 ft 7 in) overall 152.4 m (500 ft 0 in) Lpp	19.8 m (65 ft 0 in)	11.3 m (37 ft 1 in)	1 × MAN/Kawasaki D8Z-70/120 diesel single shaft, 11,033 bhp	19.6 knots (22.6 mph; 36.3 km/h)	
Ken'yō Maru	10,024 long tons (10,185 t)	160.2 m (525 ft 7 in) overall 152.4 m (500 ft 0 in) Lpp	19.8 m (65 ft 0 in)	11.3 m (37 ft 1 in)	1 × MAN/Kawasaki D8Z-70/120 diesel single shaft, 11,380 bhp	20.2 knots (23.2 mph; 37.4 km/h)	
Shinkoku Maru	10,020 long tons (10,181 t)	160.2 m (525 ft 7 in) overall 152.4 m (500 ft 0 in) Lpp	19.8 m (65 ft 0 in)	11.3 m (37 ft 1 in)	1 × MAN/Kawasaki D8Z-70/120 diesel single shaft, 11,565 bhp	19.8 knots (22.8 mph; 36.7 km/h)	
Kyūei Maru	10,171 long tons (10,334 t)	160.2 m (525 ft 7 in) overall 152.4 m (500 ft 0 in) Lpp	19.8 m (65 ft 0 in)	11.3 m (37 ft 1 in)	1 × Mitsubishi MS11-72/125 diesel single shaft, 7,360 bhp		
Nisshō Maru	10,526 long tons (10,695 t)	159.0 m (521 ft 8 in) Lpp	20.0 m (65 ft 7 in)	12.0 m (39 ft 4 in)	1 × MAN/Mitsubishi D8Zu-72/120P diesel single shaft, 9,400 bhp	19.6 knots (22.6 mph; 36.3 km/h)	
Kuroshio Maru	10,384 long tons (10,551 t)	153.8 m (504 ft 7 in) Lpp	20.1 m (65 ft 11 in)	11.4 m (37 ft 5 in)	3 × La-Mont/Kawasaki high-pressure boiler Ishikawajima turbine, single shaft, 11,805 shp	20.7 knots (23.8 mph; 38.3 km/h)	
Akatsuki Maru	10,216 long tons (10,380 t)	160.2 m (525 ft 7 in) overall 152.4 m (500 ft 0 in) Lpp	19.81 m (65 ft 0 in)	11.43 m (37 ft 6 in)	1 × Sulzer/Kōbe diesel single shaft, 10,678 bhp	20.13 knots (23.17 mph; 37.28 km/h)	
Akebono Maru	10,182 long tons (10,345 t)	160.2 m (525 ft 7 in) overall 152.4 m (500 ft 0 in) Lpp	19.81 m (65 ft 0 in)	11.43 m (37 ft 6 in)	1 × Sulzer/Kōbe diesel single shaft, 10,820 bhp	20.063 knots (23.088 mph; 37.157 km/h)	

== Photos ==
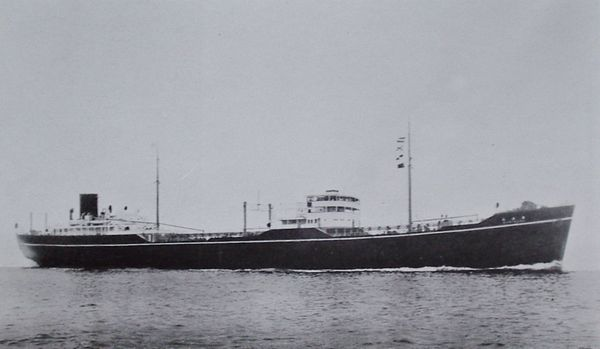
Iino Lines Tōa Maru

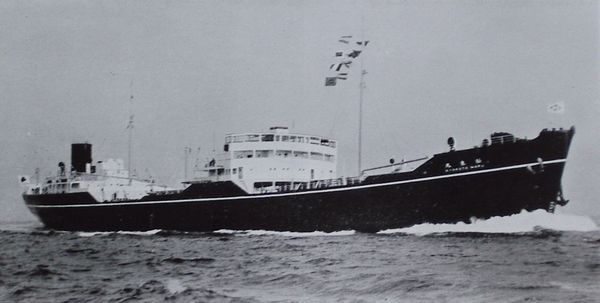
Iino Lines Kyokutō Maru

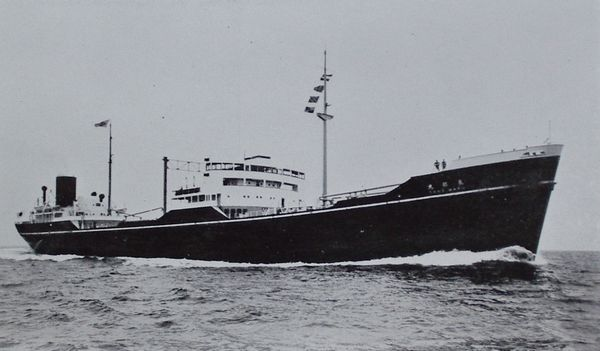
Iino Lines Tōhō Maru

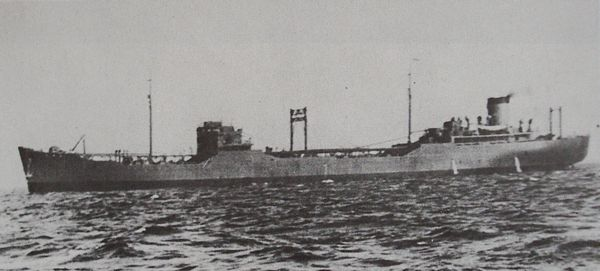
Tōei Maru in February 1941

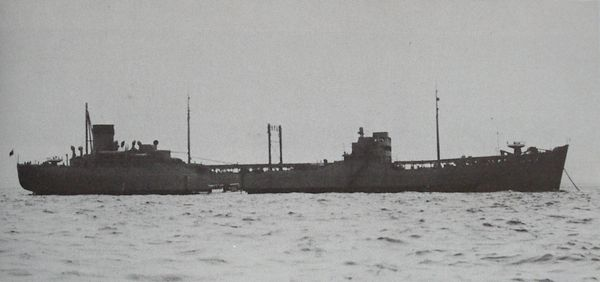
Shinkoku Maru in September 1941

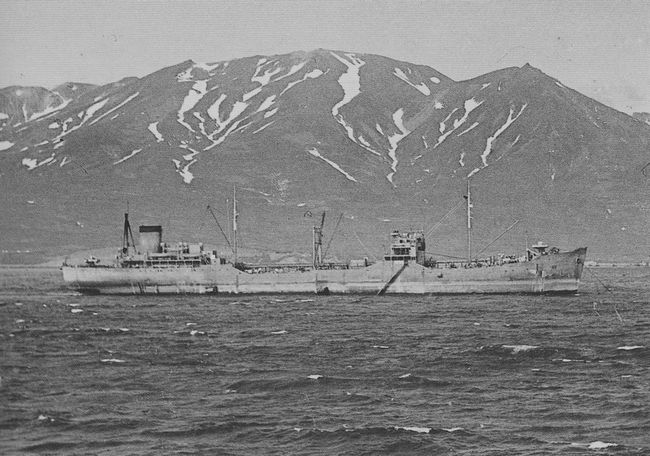
Nippon Maru in June 1943

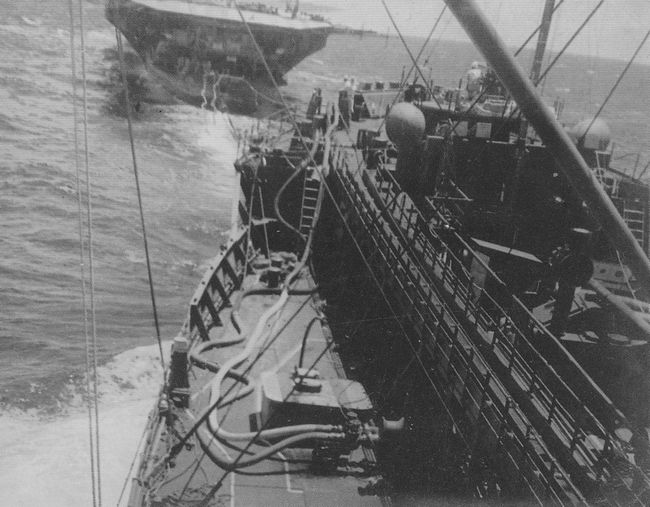
Kyokutō Maru and carrier Hiryū in May or June 1942

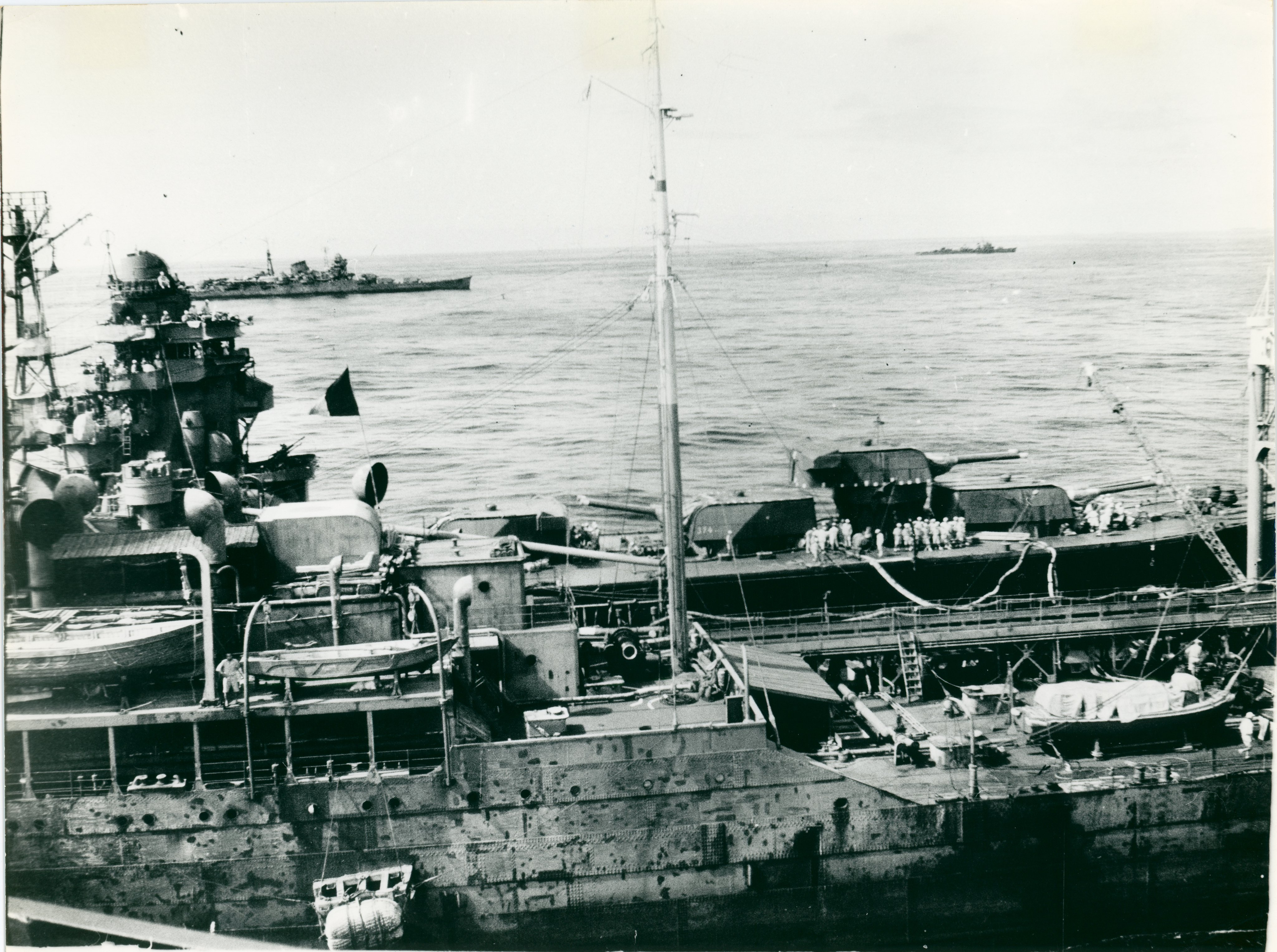
Kokuyō Maru and cruiser Tone on 17 June 1944

== Bibliography ==
- Tashirō Iwashige, The visual guide of Japanese wartime merchant marine, "Dainippon Kaiga". Archived from the original on 7 December 2002. (Japan), May 2009
- Monthly Armor Modelling special issue, "Navy Yard Vol.8 Tora! Tora! Tora!", Dainippon Kaiga (Japan), July 2008
- Kunio Matsumoto, The Lives of the Japanese Tankers, "Seizando-Shoten". Archived from the original on 17 April 2009. (Japan), January 1995
- Shinshichirō Komamiya, The Wartime Convoy Histories, "Shuppan Kyōdōsha". Archived from the original on 22 July 2011. (Japan), October 1987
- The Maru Special, Japanese Naval Vessels No.53, "Japanese support vessels", "Ushio Shobō". (Japan), July 1981
- 60 Years of the Iino Lines, "Iino Lines". (Japan), June 1959
- 50 year History of Harima Zōsen, Harima Zōsen Corporation, November 1960
- Photo Gallery of the Japanese merchant ships, Shutei Kyokai Shuppanbu (Japan), August 1950
- Grobmeier, Alvin H. (1991). "Question 28/90". Warship International. XXVIII (3): 310–311. ISSN 0043-0374.
