= Japanese aircraft carrier Sōryū =

Aircraft carrier of the Imperial Japanese Navy

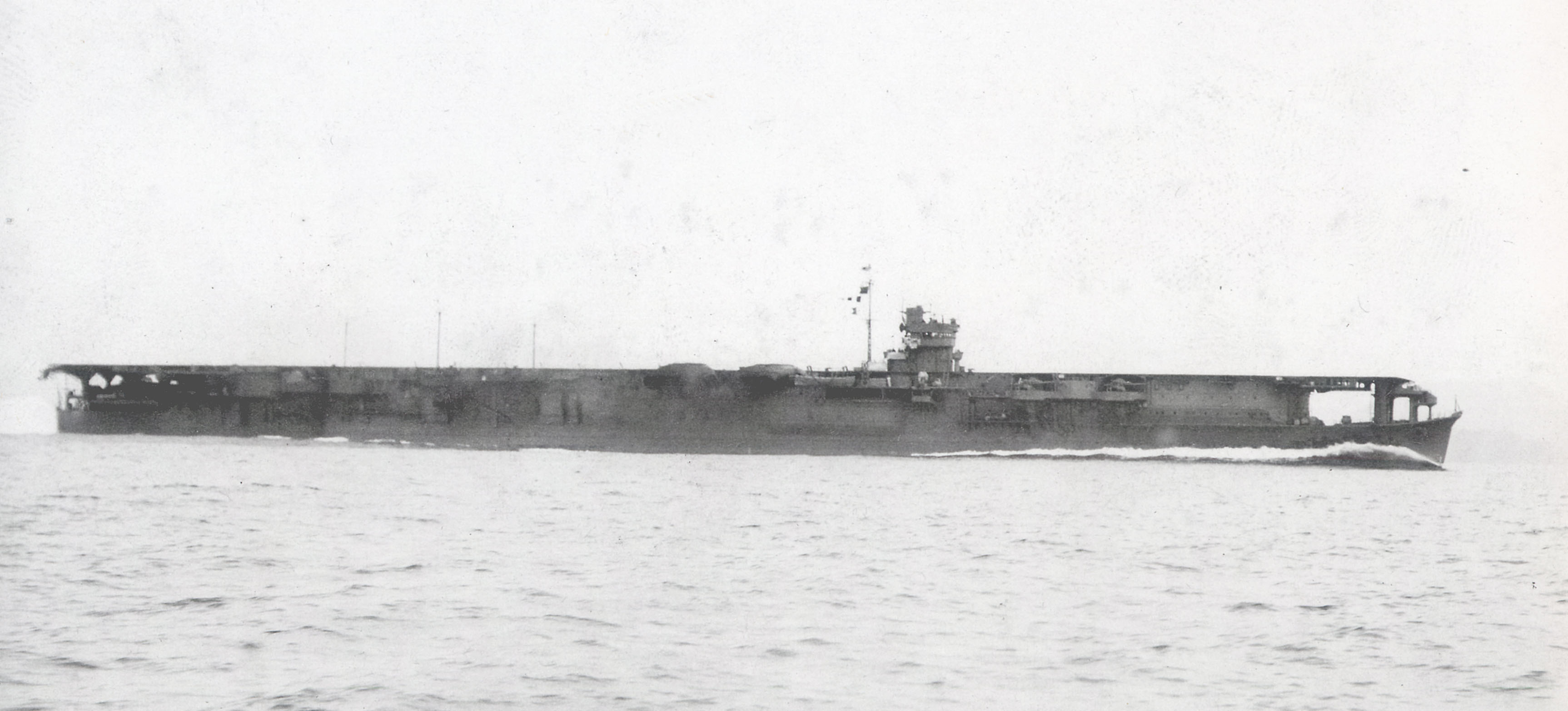
- Sōryū on trials, January 1938

Class overview
- Operators: Imperial Japanese Navy
- Preceded by: Ryūjō
- Succeeded by: Hiryū
- Built: 1934–1937
- In commission: 1937–1942
- Completed: 1
- Lost: 1

History

Japan
- Name: Sōryū
- Namesake: 蒼龍, "Blue (or Green) Dragon"
- Builder: Kure Naval Arsenal
- Laid down: 20 November 1934
- Launched: 23 December 1935
- Commissioned: 29 December 1937
- Stricken: 10 August 1942
- Fate: Scuttled during the Battle of Midway, 4 June 1942

General characteristics
- Type: Aircraft carrier
- Displacement: 16,200 t (15,900 long tons) (standard); 19,100 t (18,800 long tons) (normal)
- Length: 227.5 m (746 ft 5 in) (o/a)
- Beam: 21.3 m (69 ft 11 in)
- Draught: 7.6 m (24 ft 11 in)
- Installed power: 8 × water-tube boilers; 152,000 shp (113,000 kW)
- Propulsion: 4 × shafts; 4 × geared steam turbine sets
- Speed: 34 knots (63 km/h; 39 mph)
- Range: 7,750 nmi (14,350 km; 8,920 mi) at 18 knots (33 km/h; 21 mph)
- Complement: 1,100
- Armament: 6 × twin 12.7 cm (5 in) DP guns; 14 × twin 25 mm (1 in) AA guns
- Aircraft carried: 63 (+9 reserve) (7 Dec. 1941); 21 × Mitsubishi A6M Zero; 18 × Aichi D3A; 18 × Nakajima B5N

Sōryū (Japanese: 蒼龍; meaning "Blue (or Green) Dragon") was an aircraft carrier built for the Imperial Japanese Navy (IJN) during the mid-1930s. A sister ship, Hiryū, was intended to follow Sōryū, but Hiryū's design was heavily modified and she is often considered to be a separate class. (Note: While some sources show Sōryū and Hiryū as members of the same ship class, despite their differences, this article follows those sources that treat them as related designs of separate classes.) Sōryū's aircraft were employed in operations during the Second Sino-Japanese War in the late 1930s and supported the Japanese invasion of French Indochina in mid-1940. During the first months of the Pacific War, she took part in the attack on Pearl Harbor, the Battle of Wake Island, and supported the conquest of the Dutch East Indies. In February 1942, her aircraft bombed Darwin, Australia, and she continued on to assist in the Dutch East Indies campaign. In April, Sōryū's aircraft helped sink two British heavy cruisers and several merchant ships during the Indian Ocean raid.

After a brief refit, Sōryū and three other carriers of the 1st Air Fleet (Kidō Butai) participated in the Battle of Midway in June 1942. After bombarding American forces on Midway Atoll, the carriers were attacked by aircraft from the island and the carriers Enterprise, Hornet, and Yorktown. Dive bombers from Yorktown crippled Sōryū and set her afire. Japanese destroyers rescued the survivors but the ship could not be salvaged and was ordered to be scuttled so as to allow her attendant destroyers to be released for further operations. She sank with the loss of 711 officers and enlisted men of the 1,103 aboard. The loss of Sōryū and three other IJN carriers at Midway was a crucial strategic defeat for Japan and contributed significantly to the Allies' ultimate victory in the Pacific.

== Design and description ==
Sōryū was one of two large carriers approved for construction under the Imperial Japanese Navy's 1931–32 Supplementary Program (the other being her near-sister Hiryū). In contrast to some earlier Japanese carriers, such as Akagi and Kaga, which were conversions of battlecruiser and battleship hulls respectively, Sōryū was designed from the keel up as an aircraft carrier and incorporated lessons learned from the light carrier Ryūjō.

The ship had a length of 227.5 meters (746 ft 5 in) overall, a beam of 21.3 meters (69 ft 11 in) and a draught of 7.6 meters (24 ft 11 in). She displaced 16,200 tonnes (15,900 long tons) at standard load and 19,100 tonnes (18,800 long tons) at normal load. Her crew consisted of 1,100 officers and ratings.

=== Machinery ===
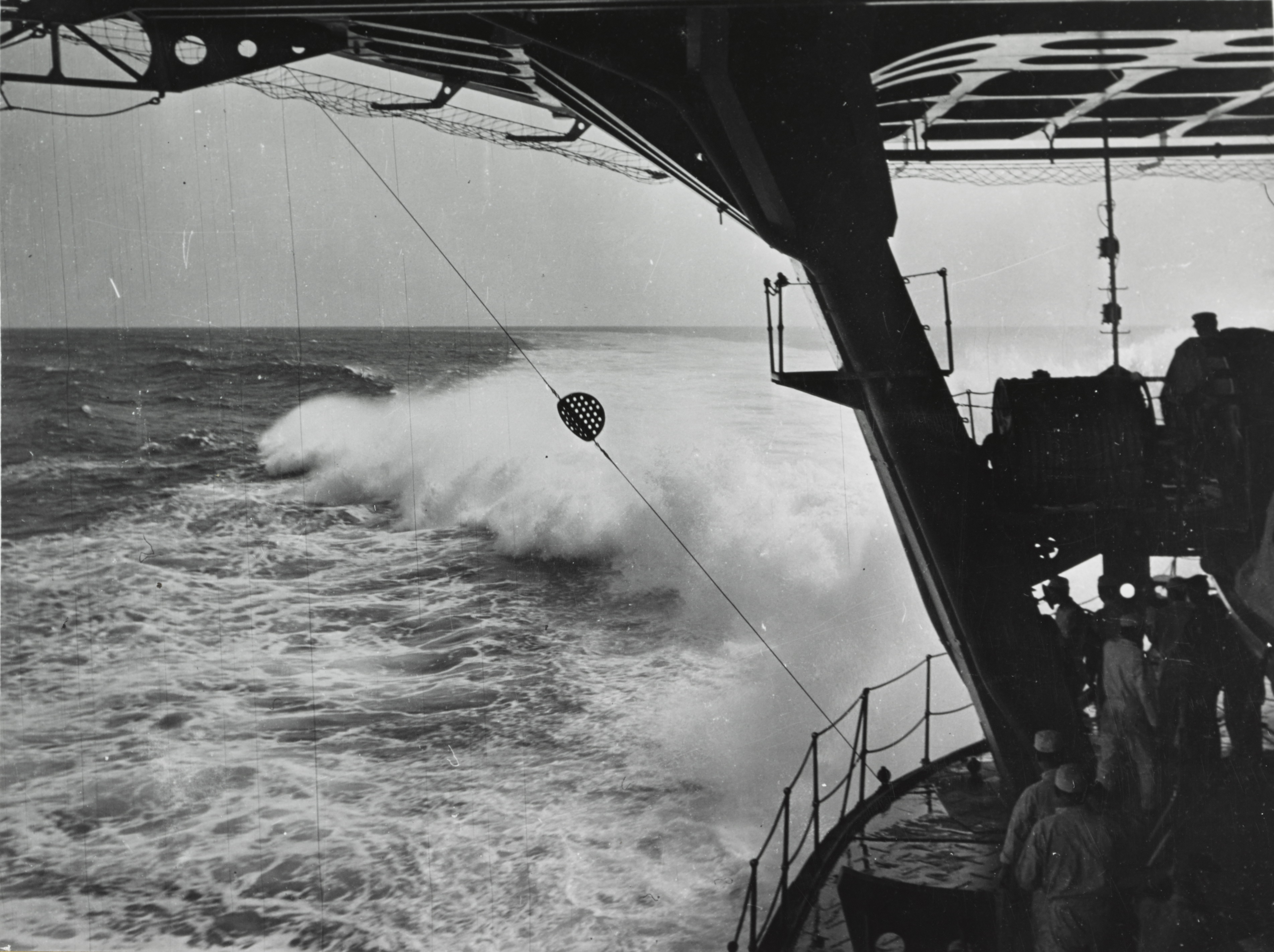
Sōryū on her speed trials, 11 November 1937

Sōryū was fitted with four geared steam turbine sets with a total of 152,000 shaft horsepower (113,000 kW), each driving one propeller shaft using steam provided by eight water-tube boilers. The turbines and boilers were the same as those used in the Mogami-class cruisers. The ship's power and slim, cruiser-type hull, with a length-to-beam ratio of 10:1, gave her a speed of 34.5 knots (63.9 km/h; 39.7 mph) and made her the fastest carrier in the world at the time of her commissioning. Sōryū carried 3,730 metric tons (3,670 long tons) of fuel oil which gave her a range of 7,750 nautical miles (14,350 km; 8,920 mi) at 18 knots (33 km/h; 21 mph). The boiler uptakes were trunked together to the ship's starboard side amidships and exhausted just below flight deck level through two funnels curved downwards.

=== Flight deck and hangars ===
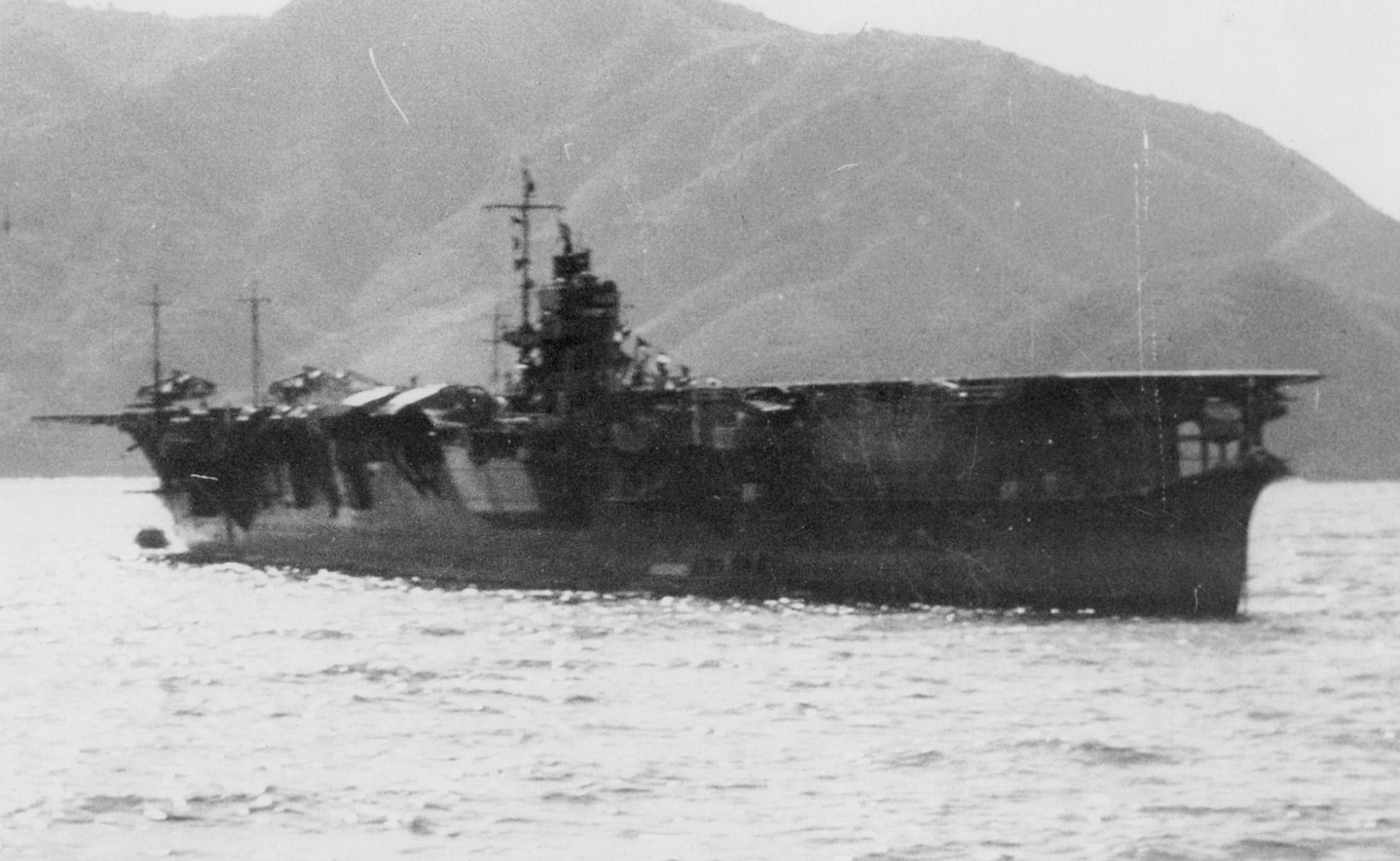
Sōryū at anchor in the Kurile Islands, shortly before the start of the Pacific War

The carrier's 216.9-meter (711 ft 7 in) flight deck was 26 meters (85 ft 4 in) wide and overhung her superstructure at both ends, supported by pairs of pillars. Sōryū's island was built on a starboard-side extension that protruded beyond the side of the hull so that it did not encroach on the width of the flight deck. Nine transverse arrestor wires were installed on the flight deck and could stop a 6,000 kg (13,000 lb) aircraft. The flight deck was only 12.8 meters (42 ft) above the waterline and the ship's designers kept this distance low by reducing the height of the hangars. The upper hangar was 171.3 by 18.3 metres (562 by 60 ft) and had an approximate height of 4.6 meters (15 ft 1 in); the lower was 142.3 by 18.3 metres (467 by 60 ft) and had an approximate height of 4.3 meters (14 ft 1 in). Together they had an approximate total area of 5,736 square metres (61,742 sq ft). This caused problems in handling aircraft because the wings of a Nakajima B5N "Kate" torpedo bomber could neither be spread nor folded in the upper hangar.

Aircraft were transported between the hangars and the flight deck by three elevators, the forward one abreast the island on the centerline and the other two offset to starboard. The forward platform measured 16 by 11.5 meters (52 ft 6 in × 37 ft 9 in), the middle one 11.5 by 12 meters (37 ft 9 in × 39 ft 4 in), and the rear 11.8 by 10 meters (38 ft 9 in × 32 ft 10 in). They were capable of transferring aircraft weighing up to 5,000 kilograms (11,000 lb). Sōryū had an aviation gasoline capacity of 570,000 liters (130,000 imp gal; 150,000 U.S. gal) for her planned aircraft capacity of sixty-three plus nine spares.

=== Armament ===
Sōryū's primary anti-aircraft (AA) armament consisted of six twin-gun mounts equipped with 50-caliber 12.7-centimeter Type 89 dual-purpose guns mounted on projecting sponsons, three on either side of the carrier's hull. The guns had a range of 14,700 meters (16,100 yd), and a ceiling of 9,440 meters (30,970 ft) at an elevation of +90 degrees. Their maximum rate of fire was fourteen rounds a minute, but their sustained rate of fire was around eight rounds per minute. The ship was equipped with two Type 94 fire-control directors to control the 12.7-centimeter (5.0 in) guns, one for each side of the ship, although the starboard director on the island could control all of the Type 89 guns.

The ship's light AA armament consisted of fourteen twin-gun mounts for license-built Hotchkiss 25 mm (1 in) Type 96 AA guns. Three of these were sited on a platform just below the forward end of the flight deck. The gun was the standard Japanese light AA weapon during World War II, but it suffered from severe design shortcomings that rendered it largely ineffective. According to historian Mark Stille, the weapon had many faults including an inability to "handle high-speed targets because it could not be trained or elevated fast enough by either hand or power, its sights were inadequate for high-speed targets, it possessed excessive vibration and muzzle blast". These guns had an effective range of 1,500–3,000 meters (1,600–3,300 yd), and a ceiling of 5,500 meters (18,000 ft) at an elevation of +85 degrees. The effective rate of fire was only between 110 and 120 rounds per minute because of the frequent need to change the 15-round magazines. The Type 96 guns were controlled by five Type 95 directors, two on each side and one in the bow.

=== Armor ===
To save weight Sōryū was minimally armored; her waterline belt of 41 millimeters (1.6 in) of Ducol steel only protected the machinery spaces and the magazines. Comparable figures for Hiryū were 90 millimeters (3.5 in) over the machinery spaces and the aviation gasoline storage tanks increasing to 150 millimeters (5.9 in) over the magazines. Sōryū's waterline belt was backed by an internal anti-splinter bulkhead. The ship's deck was only 25 mm thick over the machinery spaces and 55 millimeters (2.2 in) thick over the magazines and aviation gasoline storage tanks.

== Construction and service ==
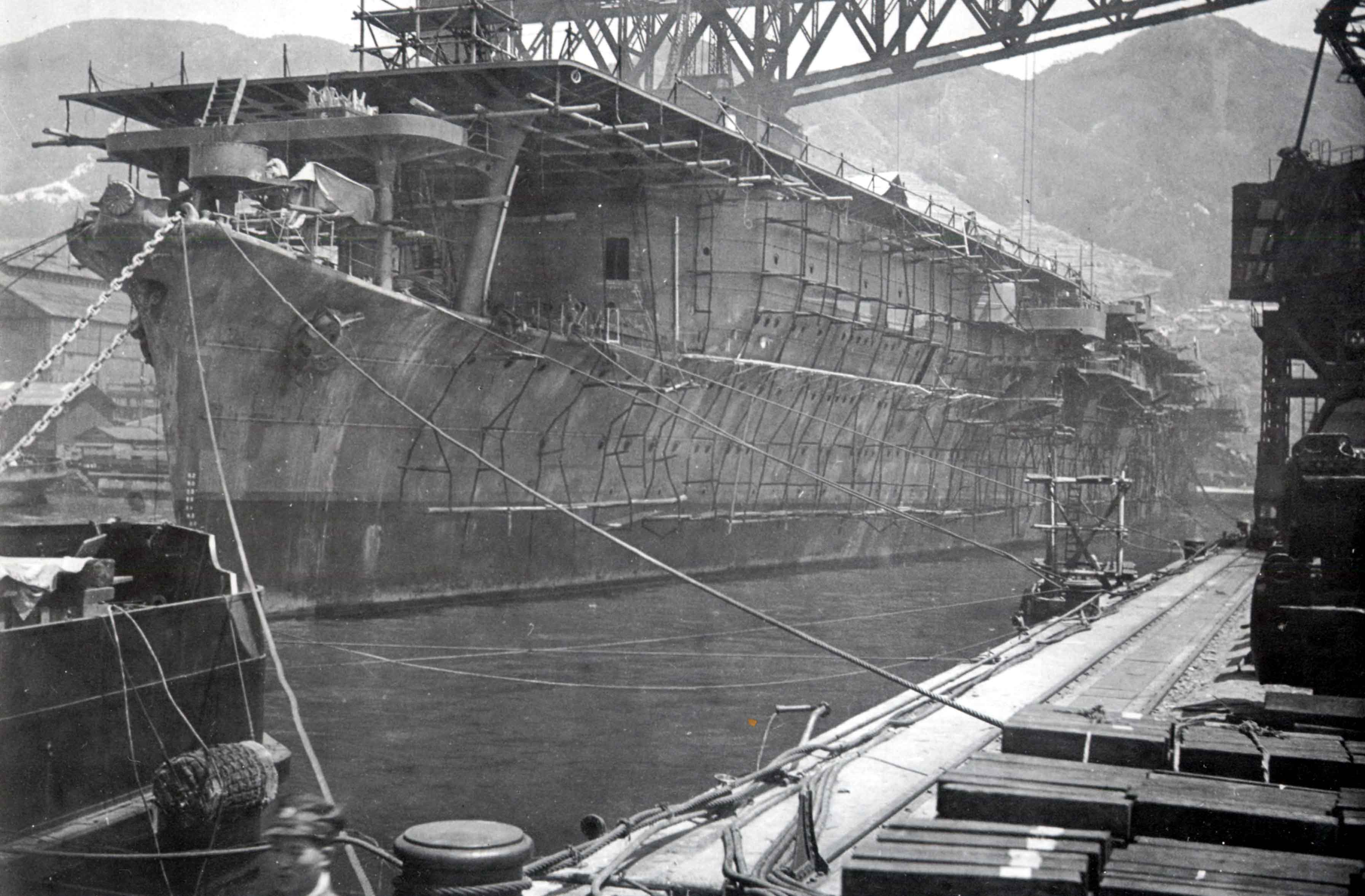
Sōryū fitting out, early 1937

Following the Japanese ship-naming conventions for aircraft carriers, Sōryū was named "Blue (or Green) Dragon". The ship was laid down at the Kure Naval Arsenal on 20 November 1934, launched on 23 December 1935 and commissioned on 29 December 1937. She was assigned to the Second Carrier Division after commissioning. Her air group was initially intended to consist of eighteen Mitsubishi A5M ("Claude") monoplane fighters, twenty-seven Aichi D1A2 ("Susie") Type 96 dive bombers, and twelve Yokosuka B4Y ("Jean") Type 96 torpedo bombers, but the A5Ms were in short supply and Nakajima A4N1 biplanes were issued instead. On 25 April 1938, nine A4Ns, eighteen D1A2s, and nine B4Ys transferred to Nanjing to support forces advancing up the Yangtze River. The air group advanced with the successful Japanese offensive, despite the defense by the Chinese Air Force and the Soviet Volunteer Group; it was transferred to Wuhu in early June and then to Anqing. Little is known of its operations there, but its primary role during this time was air defense. One fighter pilot of the group was killed after he shot down a Chinese aircraft. Leaving a few fighters and their pilots behind to serve as the nucleus of a new fighter unit, the air group returned to Sōryū on 10 July. The ship supported operations over Canton in September, but her aircraft saw no aerial combat. She returned home in December and spent most of the next year and a half training.

In September–October 1940, the ship was based at Hainan Island to support the Japanese invasion of French Indochina. In February 1941, Sōryū moved to Taiwan to reinforce the blockade of southern China. Two months later, the 2nd Carrier Division was assigned to the First Air Fleet, or Kido Butai, on 10 April. Sōryū's air group was detached in mid-July and transferred to Hainan Island to support the occupation of southern Indochina. Sōryū returned to Japan on 7 August and became flagship of the 2nd Division. She was relieved of that role on 22 September as she began a short refit that was completed on 24 October. The ship arrived at Kagoshima two days later and she resumed her former role as flagship of the Division.

=== Pearl Harbor and subsequent operations ===
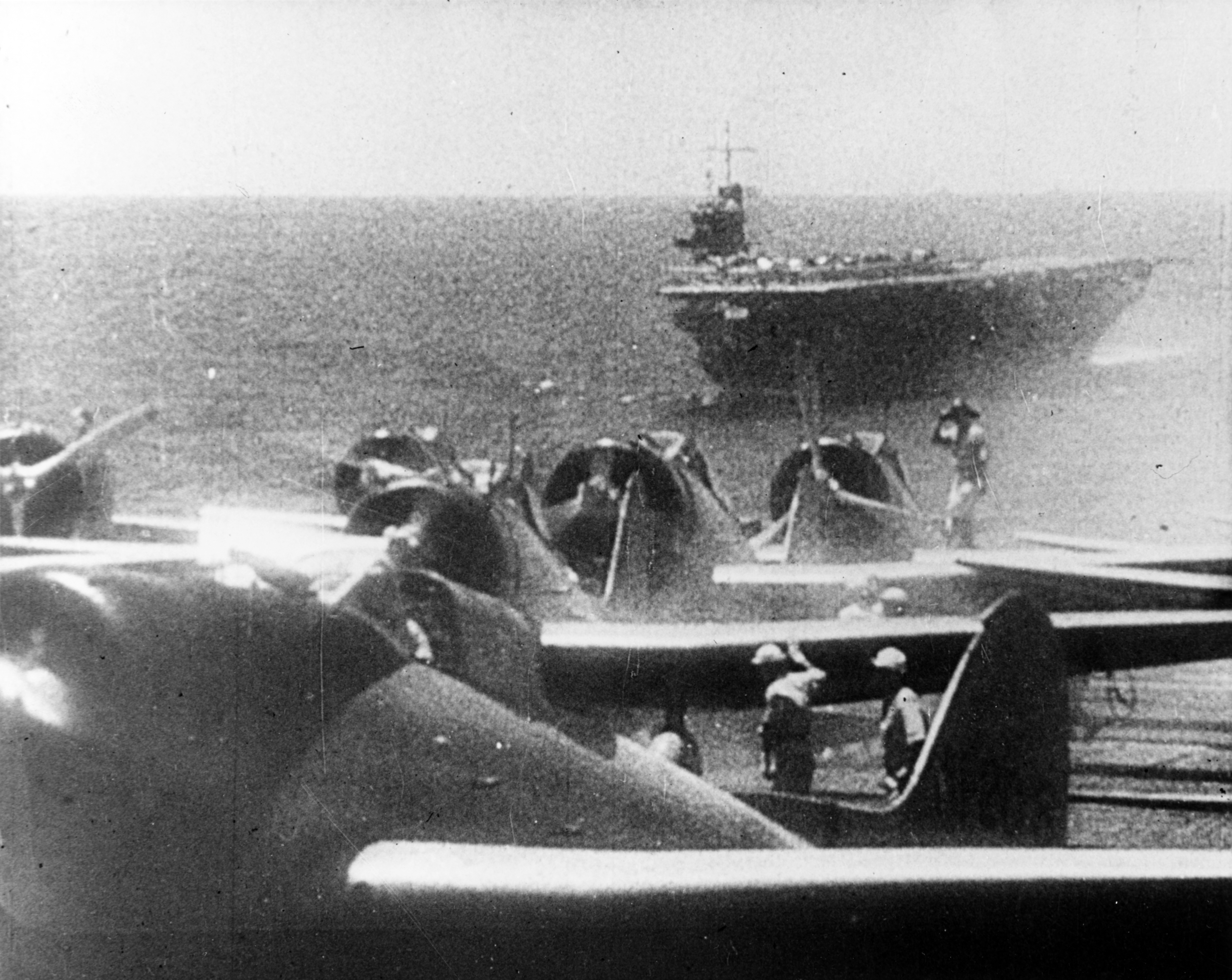
D3A "Val" dive bombers preparing to take off from an aircraft carrier for the attack on Pearl Harbor; Sōryū is in the background.

In November 1941 the IJN's Combined Fleet, under Admiral Isoroku Yamamoto, prepared to participate in Japan's initiation of war with the United States by conducting a preemptive strike against the US Navy's Pacific Fleet base at Pearl Harbor, Hawaii. On 22 November, Sōryū, commanded by Captain Ryusaku Yanagimoto, and the rest of the Kido Butai under Vice Admiral Chuichi Nagumo, including six fleet carriers from the First, Second, and Fifth Carrier Divisions, assembled in Hitokappu Bay at Etorofu Island. The fleet departed Etorofu on 26 November and followed a course across the north-central Pacific to avoid commercial shipping lanes. At this time Sōryū embarked 21 Mitsubishi A6M Zero fighters, 18 Aichi D3A "Val" dive bombers, and 18 Nakajima B5N torpedo bombers. From a position 230 nautical miles (430 km; 260 mi) north of Oahu, Sōryū and the other five carriers launched two waves of aircraft on the morning of 8 December 1941 (Japan time). (Note: Japan Standard Time is 19 hours ahead of Hawaiian Standard Time, so in Japan, the attack on Pearl Harbor happened on 8 December.)

In the first wave, eight of Sōryū's B5Ns were supposed to attack the aircraft carriers that normally berthed on the northwest side of Ford Island, but none were in Pearl Harbor that day; six B5Ns attacked the ships that were present, torpedoing the target ship Utah, causing her to capsize, and the elderly light cruiser Raleigh, damaging her. Two of the B5N pilots diverted to their secondary target, ships berthed alongside "1010 Pier", where the fleet flagship was usually moored. That battleship was in drydock and her position was occupied by the light cruiser Helena and the minelayer Oglala. One torpedo passed underneath Oglala and struck Helena in one of her engine rooms; the other pilot rejected these targets and attacked the battleship California. Her other ten B5Ns were tasked to drop 800-kilogram (1,800 lb) armor-piercing bombs on the battleships berthed on the southeast side of Ford Island ("Battleship Row") and may have scored one or two hits on them. Her eight A6M Zeros strafed parked aircraft at Marine Corps Air Station Ewa, claiming twenty-seven aircraft destroyed in addition to five aircraft shot down.

Sōryū's second wave consisted of nine A6M Zeros and seventeen D3As. The former attacked Naval Air Station Kaneohe Bay, losing one Zero to American anti-aircraft guns. On the return trip, the Zero pilots claimed to have shot down two American aircraft while losing two of their own. The D3As attacked various ships in Pearl Harbor, but it is not possible to identify which aircraft attacked which ship. Two of them were shot down during the attack.

While returning to Japan, Vice Admiral Chūichi Nagumo, commander of the First Air Fleet, ordered that Sōryū and Hiryū be detached on 16 December to attack the defenders of Wake Island who had already defeated the first Japanese attack on the island. The two carriers reached the vicinity of the island on 21 December and launched twenty-nine D3As and two B5Ns, escorted by eighteen Zeros, to attack ground targets. They encountered no aerial opposition and launched thirty-five B5Ns and six A6M Zeros the following day. They were intercepted by the two surviving Grumman F4F Wildcat fighters of Marine Fighter Squadron VMF-211. The Wildcats shot down two B5Ns before they were shot down themselves by the Zeros. The garrison surrendered the next day after Japanese troops were landed.

The carriers arrived at Kure on 29 December. They were assigned to the Southern Force on 8 January 1942 and departed four days later for the Dutch East Indies. The ships supported the invasion of the Palau Islands and the Battle of Ambon, attacking Allied positions on the island on 23 January with fifty-four aircraft. Four days later the carriers detached eighteen Zeros and nine D3As to operate from land bases in support of Japanese operations in the Battle of Borneo. On 30 January they destroyed two aircraft on the ground and shot down a Short Empire flying boat from Qantas flying to Surabaya to pick up refugees.

Sōryū and Hiryū arrived at Palau on 28 January and waited for the arrival of the carriers Kaga and Akagi. All four carriers departed Palau on 15 February and launched air strikes against Darwin, Australia, four days later. Sōryū contributed eighteen B5Ns, eighteen D3As, and nine Zeros to the attack while flying Combat Air Patrols (CAP) over the carriers. Her aircraft attacked the ships in port and its facilities, sinking or setting on fire eight ships and causing three others to be beached lest they sink. The Zeros destroyed a single Consolidated PBY Catalina flying boat; one D3A was lost. The Japanese aircraft spotted a ship on the return trip but had expended all their ordnance and had to be rearmed and refueled before they could attack the vessel. Several hours later, nine of Sōryū's D3As located and bombed an American supply ship of 3,200 gross register tons (GRT), Don Isidro, hitting her five times but failing to sink her. Sōryū and the other carriers arrived at Staring Bay on Celebes Island on 21 February to resupply and rest before departing four days later to support the invasion of Java. On 1 March 1942, the ship's D3As damaged the destroyer USS Edsall badly enough for her to be caught and sunk by Japanese cruisers. Later that day the dive bombers sank the oil tanker USS Pecos. The four carriers launched an airstrike of 180 aircraft against Tjilatjep on 5 March, sinking five small ships, damaging another nine badly enough that they had to be scuttled, and set the town on fire. Two days later they attacked Christmas Island before returning to Staring Bay on 11 March to resupply and train for the impending Indian Ocean raid. This raid was intended to secure newly conquered Burma, Malaya, and the Dutch East Indies against Allied attack by destroying base facilities and forces in the eastern Indian Ocean.

=== Indian Ocean raid ===
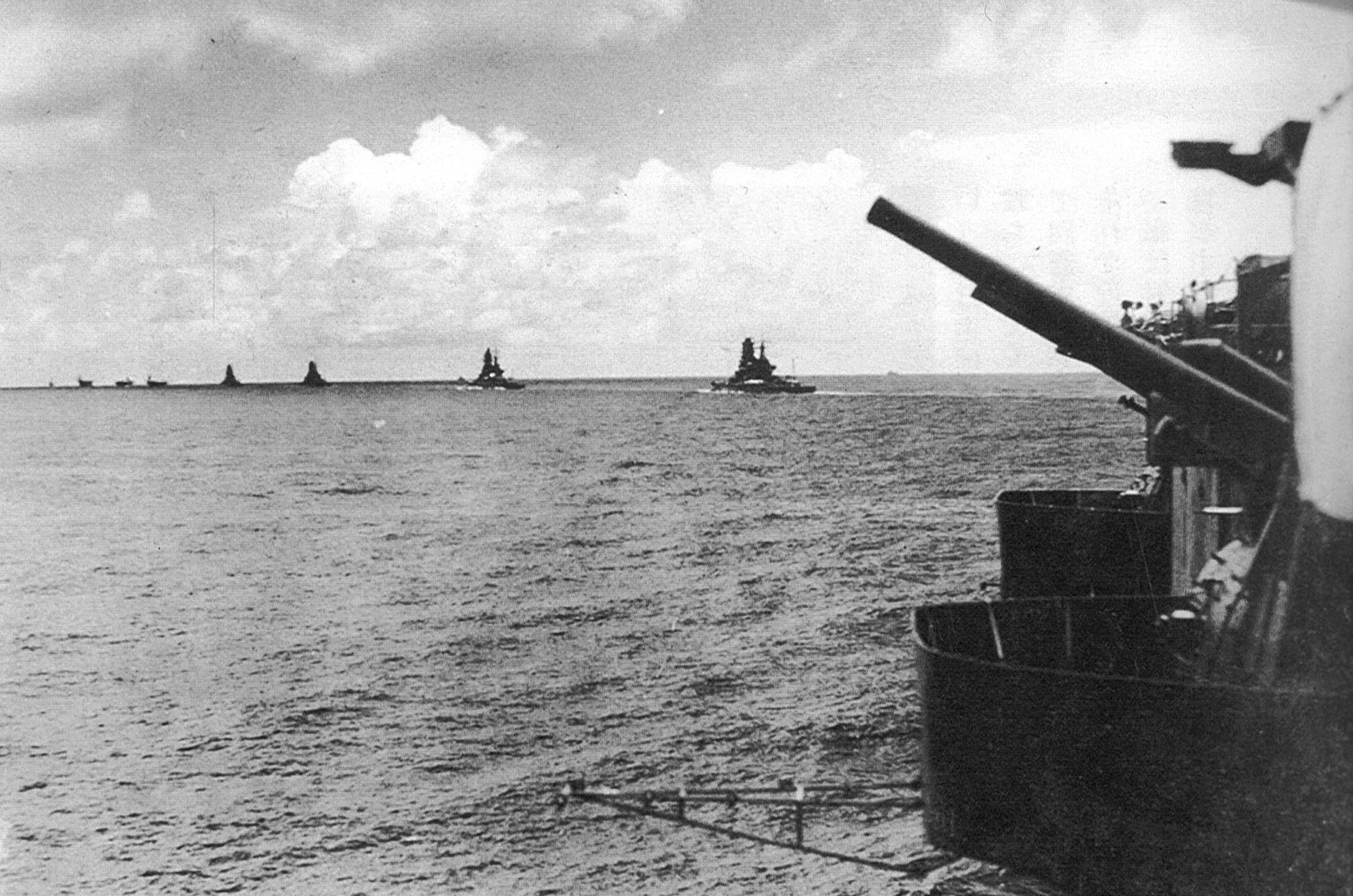
From left to right: Akagi, Sōryū, Hiryū, and the battleships Hiei, Kirishima, Haruna, and Kongō. Taken from Zuikaku, 30 March 1942.

On 26 March 1942, the five carriers of the First Air Fleet departed from Staring Bay; they were spotted by a Catalina about 350 nautical miles (650 km; 400 mi) southeast of Ceylon on the morning of 4 April. Nagumo closed to within 120 nautical miles (220 km; 140 mi) of Colombo before launching an airstrike the next morning. Sōryū contributed eighteen B5Ns and nine Zeros to the force. The pilots of the latter aircraft claimed to have shot down a single Fairey Fulmar of 806 Naval Air Squadron, plus seven other fighters while losing one of their own. The D3As and B5Ns inflicted some damage to the port facilities, but a day's warning had allowed most of the shipping in the harbor to be evacuated. Later that morning the British heavy cruisers Cornwall and Dorsetshire were spotted and Sōryū launched eighteen D3As. They were the first to attack and claimed to have made fourteen hits on the two ships, sinking both in combination with the dive bombers from the other carriers.

On 9 April, Sōryū contributed eighteen B5Ns, escorted by nine Zeros, to the attack on Trincomalee. Her B5Ns were the first to bomb the port and her fighters did not encounter any British fighters. Meanwhile, a floatplane from the battleship Haruna spotted the small aircraft carrier Hermes, escorted by the Australian destroyer Vampire, and every available D3A was launched to attack the ships. Sōryū contributed eighteen dive bombers, but they arrived too late and instead found three other ships further north. They sank the oil tanker British Sergeant and the Norwegian cargo ship Norviken before they were attacked by eight Fulmars of 803 and 806 Naval Air Squadrons. The Royal Navy pilots claimed three D3As shot down for the loss of a pair of Fulmars; the Japanese actually lost four D3As with another five damaged. While this was going on, Akagi narrowly escaped damage when nine British Bristol Blenheim bombers from Ceylon penetrated the CAP and dropped their bombs from 11,000 feet (3,400 m). Sōryū had six Zeros aloft, along with fourteen more from the other carriers, and they collectively accounted for five of the British bombers for the loss of one of Hiryū's Zeros. After launching the D3As that sank Hermes and the other ships, the First Air Fleet reversed course and headed southeast for the Malacca Strait before recovering their aircraft; they then proceeded to Japan.

On 19 April, while transiting the Bashi Straits between Taiwan and Luzon en route to Japan, Akagi, Sōryū, and Hiryū were sent in pursuit of the American carriers Hornet and Enterprise, which had launched the Doolittle Raid against Tokyo. They found only empty ocean, for the American carriers had immediately departed the area to return to Hawaii. The carriers quickly abandoned the chase and dropped anchor at Hashirajima anchorage on 22 April. Having been engaged in constant operations for four and a half months, Sōryū, along with the other three carriers of the First and Second Carrier Divisions, was hurriedly refitted and replenished in preparation for the Combined Fleet's next major operation, scheduled to begin one month hence. While at Hashirajima, Sōryū's air group was based ashore at nearby Kasanohara, near Kagoshima, and conducted flight and weapons training with the other First Air Fleet carrier units.

=== Midway ===
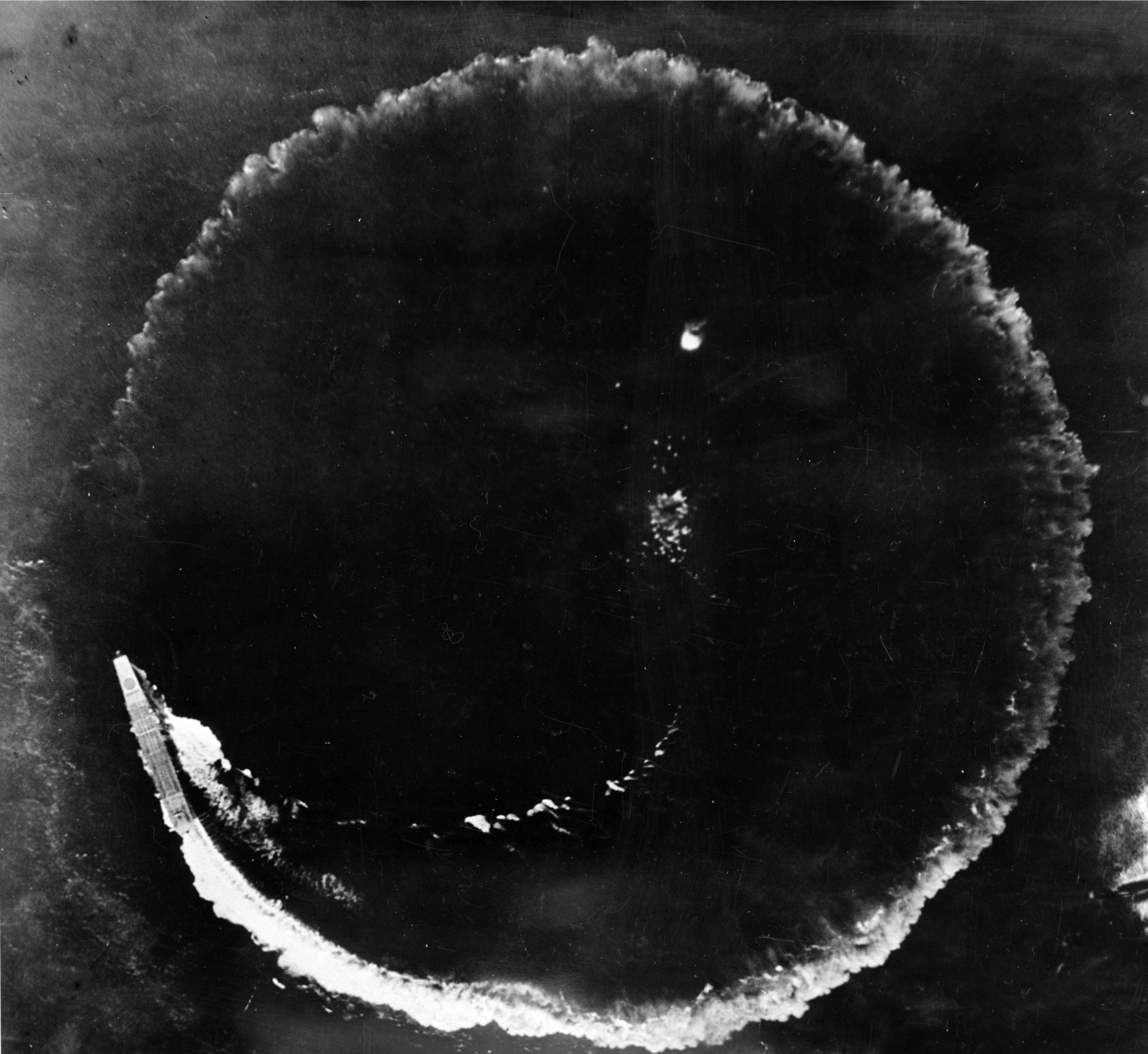
Aerial photograph of Sōryū and its circular wake on the morning of 4 June 1942. The ship was circling to evade bombs dropped from high altitude by US B-17 aircraft. The photograph was taken from one of the B17s.

Concerned by the US carrier strikes in the Marshall Islands, Lae-Salamaua, and the Doolittle raids, Yamamoto was determined to force the US Navy into a showdown to eliminate the American carrier threat. He decided to invade and occupy Midway Island, an action that he was sure would draw out the American carriers. The Japanese codenamed the Midway invasion Operation MI.

On 25 May 1942, Sōryū set out with the Combined Fleet's carrier striking force in the company of Kaga, Akagi, and Hiryū, which constituted the First and Second Carrier Divisions, for the attack on Midway Island. Her aircraft complement consisted of eighteen Zeros, sixteen D3As, eighteen B5Ns, and two preproduction reconnaissance variants (D4Y1-C) of the new Yokosuka D4Y dive bomber. Also aboard were three A6M Zeros of the 6th Kōkūtai intended as a portion of the aerial garrison for Midway.

With the fleet positioned 250 nautical miles (460 km; 290 mi) northwest of Midway at dawn (04:45 local time) on 4 June 1942, Sōryū's part in the 108-plane combined air raid was a strike on the airfield on Eastern Island with eighteen torpedo bombers escorted by nine Zeros. The air group suffered heavily during the attack; a single B5N was shot down by fighters, two more were forced to ditch on the return (both crews rescued), and five (including one that landed aboard Hiryu) were damaged beyond repair. The Japanese did not know that the US Navy had discovered their MI plan by breaking their cipher, and had prepared an ambush using its three available carriers, positioned northeast of Midway.

The carrier also contributed 3 Zeros to the total of eleven assigned to the initial combat air patrol (CAP) over the four carriers. By 07:00 the carrier had six fighters with the CAP that helped to defend the Kido Butai from the first US attackers from Midway Island at 07:10. At this time, Nagumo's carriers were attacked by six US Navy Grumman TBF Avengers from Torpedo Squadron 8 (VT-8) that had been temporarily detached from the Hornet to Midway, and four United States Army Air Corps (USAAC) Martin B-26 Marauders, all carrying torpedoes. The Avengers went after Hiryū while the Marauders attacked Akagi. The thirty CAP Zeros in the air at this time, including the six from Sōryū, immediately attacked the American airplanes, shooting down five of the Avengers and two of the B-26s. The surviving aircraft dropped their torpedoes, but all missed. Sōryū launched three more Zeros to reinforce the CAP, at 07:10.

At 07:15 Admiral Nagumo ordered the B5Ns on Kaga and Akagi rearmed with bombs for another attack on Midway itself. This process was limited by the number of ordnance carts (used to handle the bombs and torpedoes) and ordnance elevators, preventing torpedoes from being stowed belowdeck until after all the bombs were moved up from their magazine, assembled, and mounted on the aircraft. The process normally took about an hour and a half; more time would be required to bring the aircraft up to the flight deck, and to warm up and launch the strike group. Around 07:40 Nagumo reversed his order when he received a message from one of his scout aircraft that American warships had been spotted. Depleted of ammunition, the first six of Sōryū's CAP Zeros landed aboard the carrier at 07:30.

At 07:55, the next American strike from Midway arrived in the form of sixteen Douglas SBD Dauntless bombers of Marine Scout Bomber Squadron 241 (VMSB-241) under Major Lofton R. Henderson. (Note: To this day there is much confusion about VMSB-241 at Midway. At that time the squadron was in transition from the obsolete SB2U Vindicator to the modern SBD-2 Dauntless and flew both aircraft during the battle.) Sōryū's three CAP fighters were among the nine still aloft that attacked Henderson's planes, shooting down six of them as they executed a fruitless glide-bombing attack on Hiryū. At roughly the same time, a dozen USAAC Boeing B-17 Flying Fortresses attacked the Japanese carriers, bombing from 20,000 feet (6,100 m). The high altitude of the B-17s gave the Japanese captains enough time to anticipate where the bombs would land and successfully maneuver their ships out of the impact area. Four B-17s attacked Sōryū, but they all missed.

The CAP defeated the next American air strike from Midway, shooting down three of the eleven Vought SB2U Vindicator dive bombers from VMSB-241, which attacked the battleship Haruna unsuccessfully, starting at around 08:30. Although all the American air strikes had thus far caused negligible damage, they kept the Japanese carrier forces off-balance as Nagumo endeavored to prepare a response to news, received at 08:20, of the sighting of American carrier forces to his northeast. Around 08:30 Sōryū launched one of her D4Ys on a mission to confirm the location of the American carriers.

Sōryū began recovering her Midway strike force at around 08:40 and finished shortly by 09:10. The landed aircraft were quickly struck below, while the carriers' crews began preparations to spot aircraft for the strike against the American carrier forces. The preparations were interrupted at 09:18 when the first American carrier aircraft to attack were sighted. These consisted of fifteen Douglas TBD Devastator torpedo bombers of VT-8, led by Lieutenant Commander John C. Waldron from Hornet. The three airborne CAP Zeros were landing aboard at 09:30 when the Americans unsuccessfully attempted a torpedo attack on Soryū, but three of the morning's escort fighters were still airborne and joined the eighteen CAP fighters in destroying Waldron's planes. All of the American planes were shot down, leaving George H. Gay Jr.—the only surviving aviator—treading water.

Shortly afterwards, fourteen Devastators from Torpedo Squadron 6 (VT-6) from the Enterprise, led by Lieutenant Commander Eugene E. Lindsey, attacked. Lindsey's aircraft tried to sandwich Kaga, but the CAP, reinforced by three more Zeros launched by Sōryū at 09:45, shot down all but four of the Devastators, and Kaga dodged the torpedoes. Sōryū launched another trio of CAP Zeros at 10:00 and another three at 10:15 after Torpedo Squadron 3 (VT-3) from Yorktown was spotted. A Wildcat escorting VT-3 shot down one of her Zeros.

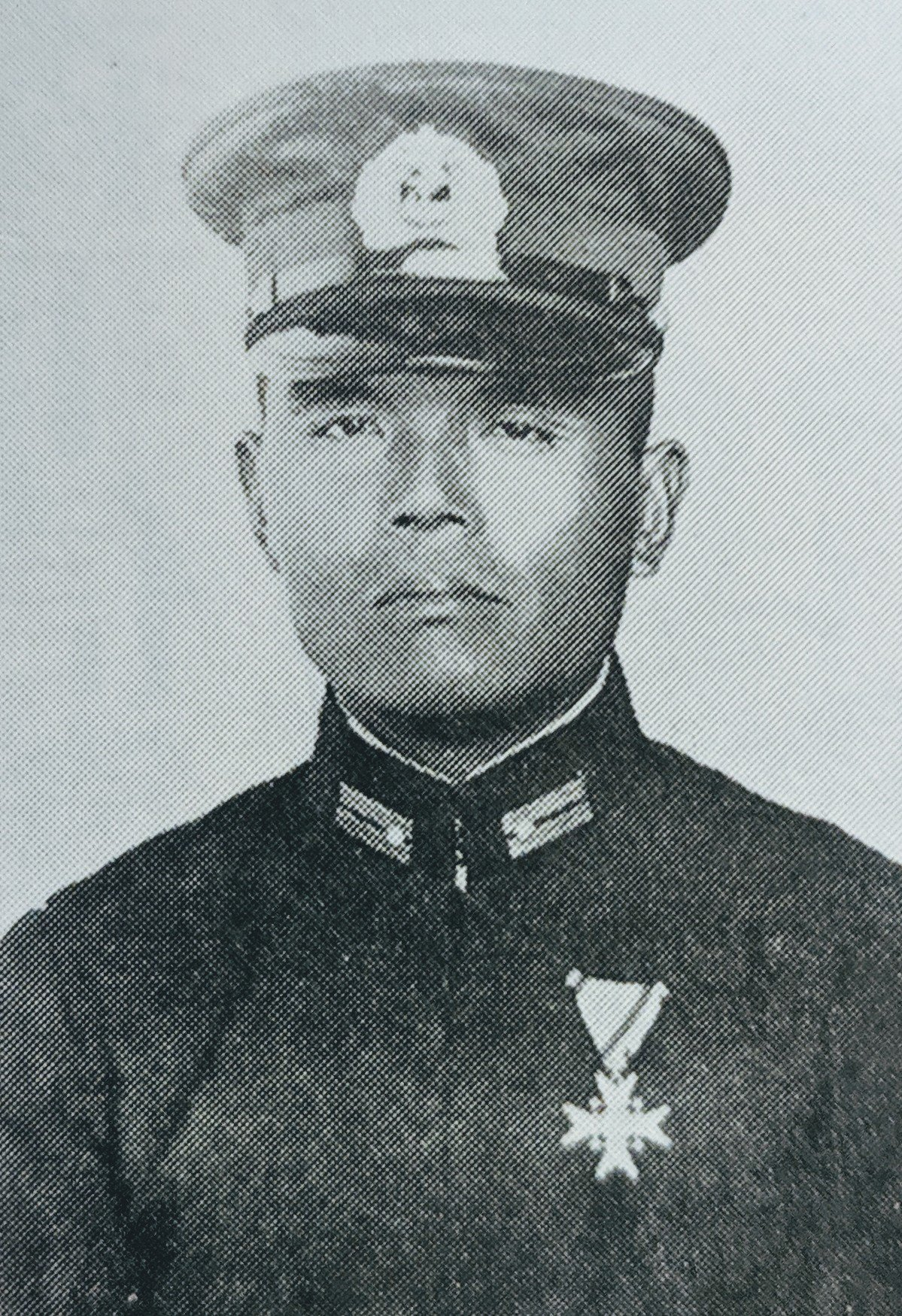
Captain Ryusaku Yanagimoto

While VT-3 was still attacking Hiryū, American dive bombers arrived over the Japanese carriers almost undetected and began their dives. It was at this time, around 10:20, that in the words of Jonathan Parshall and Anthony Tully, the "Japanese air defenses would finally and catastrophically fail". At 10:25, Sōryū was attacked by thirteen Dauntlesses from Yorktown's Bombing Squadron 3 (VB-3). The carrier received three direct hits from 1,000 lb (454 kg) bombs: one penetrated to the lower hangar deck amidships, and the other two exploded in the upper hangar deck fore and aft. The hangars contained armed and fueled aircraft preparing for the upcoming strike, resulting in secondary explosions and rupturing the steam pipes in the boiler rooms. Within a very short time the fires on the ship were out of control. At 10:40 she stopped and her crew was ordered to abandon ship five minutes later. The destroyers Isokaze and Hamakaze rescued the survivors. Sōryū was still afloat and showed no signs of beginning to sink by early evening, so Isokaze was ordered to scuttle her with torpedoes so as to allow the destroyers to be used for possible operations that night. The destroyer reported at 19:15 that Sōryū had sunk at position 30°38′N 179°13′W. Losses were 711 crew of her complement of 1,103, including Captain Yanagimoto, who chose to remain on board. This was the highest mortality percentage of all the Japanese carriers lost at Midway, due largely to the devastation in both hangar decks.

The loss of Sōryū and the three other IJN carriers at Midway, comprising two-thirds of Japan's total number of fleet carriers and the experienced core of the First Air Fleet, was a crucial strategic defeat and contributed significantly to the ultimate Allied victory. In an effort to conceal the defeat, the ship was not immediately removed from the Navy's registry of ships, awaiting a "suitable opportunity" before finally being struck from the registry on 10 August 1942.

== Bibliography ==
- Bōeichō Bōei Kenshūjo (1967), Senshi Sōsho Hawai Sakusen. Tokyo: Asagumo Shimbunsha.
- Brown, David (1977). WWII Fact Files: Aircraft Carriers. New York: Arco Publishing. ISBN 0-668-04164-1.
- Brown, J. D. (2009). Carrier Operations in World War II. Annapolis, Maryland: Naval Institute Press. ISBN 978-1-59114-108-2.
- Campbell, John (1985). Naval Weapons of World War Two. Annapolis, Maryland: Naval Institute Press. ISBN 0-87021-459-4.
- Chesneau, Roger (1995). Aircraft Carriers of the World, 1914 to the Present: An Illustrated Encyclopedia (New, Revised ed.). Annapolis, Maryland: Naval Institute Press. ISBN 0-87021-902-2.
- Condon, John P. (n.d.). U.S. Marine Corps Aviation. Washington, D.C.: Government Printing Office.
- Hata, Ikuhiko; Izawa, Yasuho & Shores, Christopher (2011). Japanese Naval Air Force Fighter Units and Their Aces 1932–1945. London: Grub Street. ISBN 978-1-906502-84-3.
- Hooton, Edward R. (1987). "Air War Over China". Air Enthusiast (34). Bromley, Kent, UK: Pilot Press: 7–24. ISSN 0143-5450.
- Jentschura, Hansgeorg; Jung, Dieter & Mickel, Peter (1977). Warships of the Imperial Japanese Navy, 1869–1945. Annapolis, Maryland: United States Naval Institute. ISBN 0-87021-893-X.
- Lundstrom, John B. (2005). The First Team: Pacific Naval Air Combat from Pearl Harbor to Midway (New ed.). Annapolis, Maryland: Naval Institute Press. ISBN 1-59114-471-X.
- Parshall, Jonathan & Tully, Anthony (2005). Shattered Sword: The Untold Story of the Battle of Midway. Dulles, Virginia: Potomac Books. ISBN 1-57488-923-0.
- Peattie, Mark (2001). Sunburst: The Rise of Japanese Naval Air Power 1909–1941. Annapolis, Maryland: Naval Institute Press. ISBN 1-55750-432-6.
- Polmar, Norman & Genda, Minoru (2006). Aircraft Carriers: A History of Carrier Aviation and Its Influence on World Events. Vol. 1, 1909–1945. Washington, D.C.: Potomac Books. ISBN 1-57488-663-0.
- Shores, Christopher; Cull, Brian & Izawa, Yasuho (1992). Bloody Shambles. Vol. I: The Drift to War to the Fall of Singapore. London: Grub Street. ISBN 0-948817-50-X.
- Shores, Christopher; Cull, Brian & Izawa, Yasuho (1993). Bloody Shambles. Vol. II: The Defence of Sumatra to the Fall of Burma. London: Grub Street. ISBN 0-948817-67-4.
- Silverstone, Paul H. (1984). Directory of the World's Capital Ships. New York: Hippocrene Books. ISBN 0-88254-979-0.
- Stille, Mark (2007). USN Carriers vs IJN Carriers: The Pacific 1942. Duel. Vol. 6. Oxford, UK: Osprey Publishing. ISBN 978-1-84603-248-6.
- Sturton, Ian (1980). "Japan". In Chesneau, Roger (ed.). Conway's All the World's Fighting Ships 1922–1946. Greenwich, UK: Conway Maritime Press. ISBN 0-85177-146-7.
- Tully, Anthony P. (2000). "IJN Soryu: Tabular Record of Movement". Kido Butai. Combinedfleet.com.
- Zimm, Alan D. (2011). Attack on Pearl Harbor: Strategy, Combat, Myths, Deceptions. Havertown, Pennsylvania: Casemate Publishers. ISBN 978-1-61200-010-7.
