= George M. Campbell =

Recipient of the Navy Cross

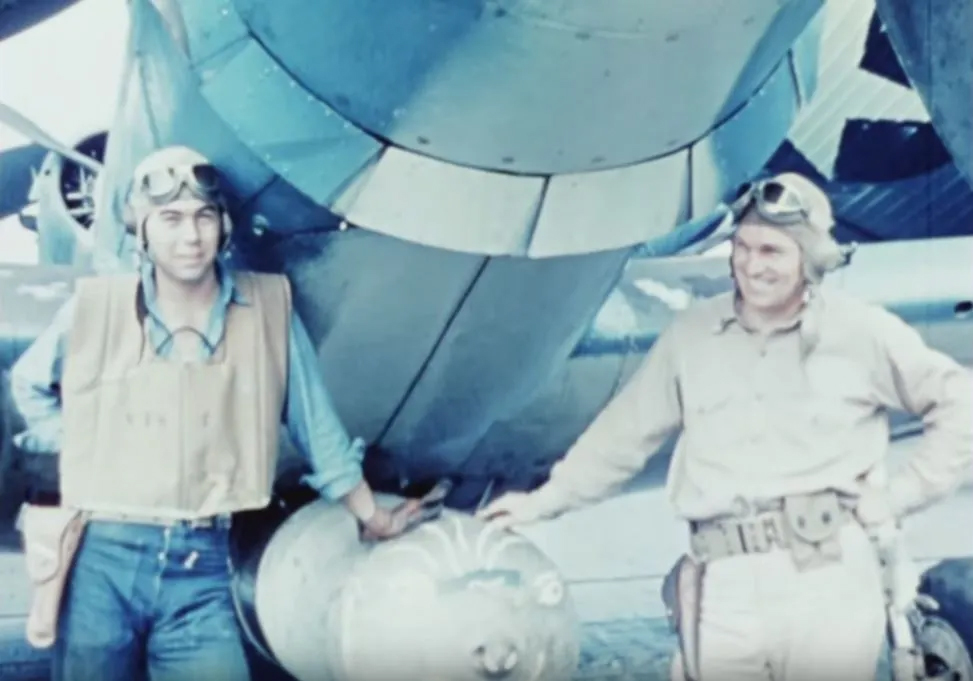
- Screenshot from John Ford's short film Torpedo Squadron 8 (1942), showing Lieutenant JG George M. Campbell (right) and Airman 2nd Class Ronald J. Fisher with their plane on the USS Hornet
- Born: January 7, 1907; Madras, Oregon
- Died: June 4, 1942 (aged 35); Pacific Ocean, near Midway Atoll
- Military career
- Allegiance: United States of America
- Branch: United States Navy
- Service years: 1928–1942
- Rank: Lieutenant, junior grade
- Unit: Torpedo Squadron 8
- Conflicts: World War II: Battle of Midway
- Awards: Navy Cross; Purple Heart

George Marvin Campbell (January 7, 1907 – June 4, 1942) was a United States Navy officer. He was killed in action at the Battle of Midway while flying a torpedo bomber during an attack against several Japanese aircraft carriers.

== Early life ==
Campbell was born on January 7, 1907, in Madras, Oregon. He was the ninth of a dozen children in his family. His father was a dairy farmer who also piloted a ferry across the Deschutes River. Campbell attended a one room schoolhouse, excelled at basketball in high school, and was part of a team that won a state championship in 1925.

He attended Oregon State University.

== Naval career ==
On June 27, 1928, Campbell enlisted in the U.S. Navy. After boot camp, he spent eight months aboard the USS Lexington (CV-2). He did flight training in Pensacola, Florida, and received his wings in 1930. While in that training, he met and married Genevieve Thompson, by whom he had a daughter, Shirley, born in 1932.

He served as a flight instructor beginning in 1938. At the dawn of the Japanese Attack on Pearl Harbor, he had become one of the Navy's most experienced pilots. Lieutenant Commander John C. Waldron, commander of Torpedo Squadron 8, relied on him as a teacher and mentor to the younger pilots. Campbell was promoted to Lieutenant (junior grade) in February 1942.

In 1942 Campbell underwent more flight training and was appointed Lieutenant, junior grade, on April 2, 1942.

He joined Torpedo Squadron 8 on board the aircraft carrier USS Hornet (CV-8) just in time to take part in the Battle of Midway.

VT-8's first and best-known combat mission came during the Battle of Midway on 4 June 1942. All 15 of Lieutenant Commander John C. Waldron's planes, obsolete Douglas TBD Devastators, were shot down during their unescorted torpedo attack on Imperial Japanese Navy aircraft carriers. The squadron failed to damage any Japanese carriers or destroy enemy aircraft.

Only one member of VT-8 who flew from Hornet on that day survived in the action, Ensign George Gay. Ensign Gay was rescued the day following the battle. Torpedo 8 was afterwards awarded the American Presidential Unit Citation. As Ensign Gay tells it, the flight was chancy at best. They had never performed an attack with torpedoes, and in fact had never even taken off from a carrier with torpedoes. Their equipment was old, and the efficacy of their armament was questionable. He thought that the absence of fighter cover may have made the difference. Nevertheless, he thinks that the low level attack, which drew down the Japanese fighter air cover, opened up the skies for the successful attack by the dive bombers, and that this attack should be given that credit. In passing, Gay has remarked that his sole survival, after being shot down, was just a matter of luck.

Piloting a Douglas TBD-1 Devastator torpedo bomber during the battle, Campbell took off with his squadron on June 4, 1942, to intercept the Japanese fleet, and without fighter cover attacked the enemy aircraft carriers against murderous opposition. Knowing full well that they had insufficient fuel to return to Hornet, the Torpedo Squadron 8 crews pressed their attack gallantly until all were shot down. Campbell was listed as presumed dead on June 5, 1942. Campbell was awarded the Navy Cross for his heroic actions at Midway. He was killed in action during the attack.

== Awards and honors ==
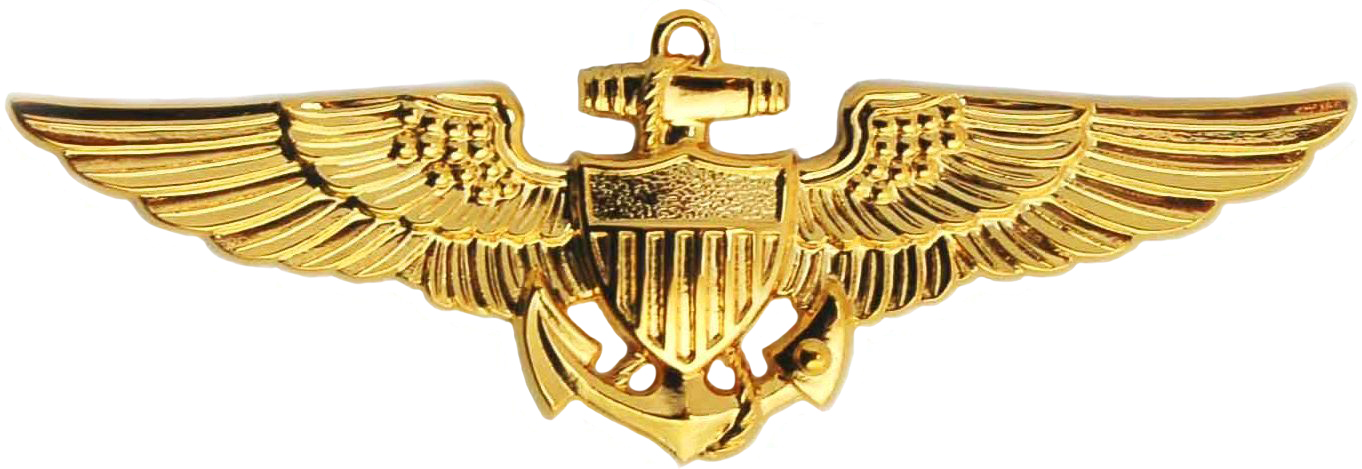

Naval Aviator Badge
Navy Cross		Purple Heart
Navy Good Conduct Medal w/ three 3/16" bronze stars	Navy Presidential Unit Citation	American Defense Service Medal w/ 3/16" bronze star (Fleet clasp)
American Campaign Medal	Asiatic–Pacific Campaign Medal w/ 3/16" bronze star	World War II Victory Medal

=== Navy Cross citation ===

Lieutenant Junior Grade George Marvin Campbell
U.S. Navy
Date Of Action: June 4, 1942

The President of the United States of America takes pride in presenting the Navy Cross (Posthumously) to Lieutenant, Junior Grade George Marvin Campbell, United States Navy, for extraordinary heroism in operations against the enemy while serving as Pilot of a carrier-based Navy Torpedo Plane of Torpedo Squadron Eight (VT-8), attached to the USS HORNET (CV-8), during the "Air Battle of Midway," against enemy Japanese forces on 4 June 1942. Grimly aware of the hazardous consequences of flying without fighter protection, and with insufficient fuel to return to his carrier, Lieutenant, Junior Grade, Campbell, resolutely, and with no thought of his own life, delivered an effective torpedo attached against violent assaults of enemy Japanese aircraft and against an almost solid barrage of anti-aircraft fire. His courageous action, carried out with a gallant spirit of self-sacrifice and a conscientious devotion to the fulfillment of his mission, was a determining factor in the defeat of the enemy forces and was in keeping with the highest traditions of the United States Naval Service. He gallantly gave his life for his country.

=== Legacy ===
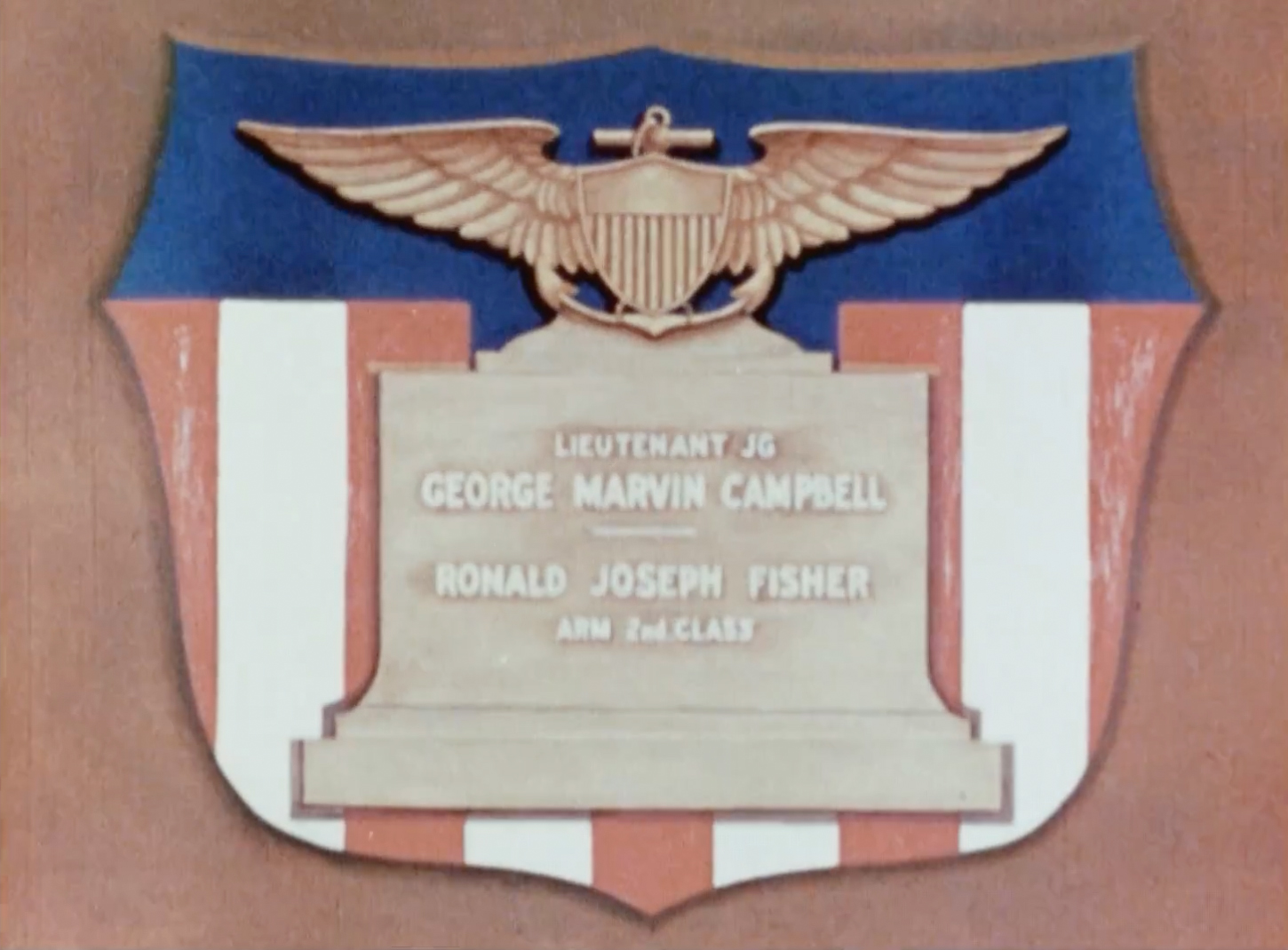
Intertitle from the "In Memoriam" section that concludes John Ford's short film Torpedo Squadron 8, preceding film footage of Campbell and Fisher

As a tribute to the 30 squadron members who operated from the USS Hornet, director John Ford created an eight-minute 1942 documentary filmed during the Battle of Midway.

The U.S. Navy destroyer escort USS George M. Campbell (DE-773), laid down by the Tampa Shipbuilding Company at Tampa, Florida, was launched in 1944 but never completed. The construction contract for the vessel named for Campbell was cancelled, and she was towed to Charleston, South Carolina. Stripped for parts, she was scrapped.

A short film dealing with the men and the achievements of Torpedo Squadron 8 was produced by the National Museum of the Pacific War.
