= USS Fieberling =

Buckley-class destroyer escort

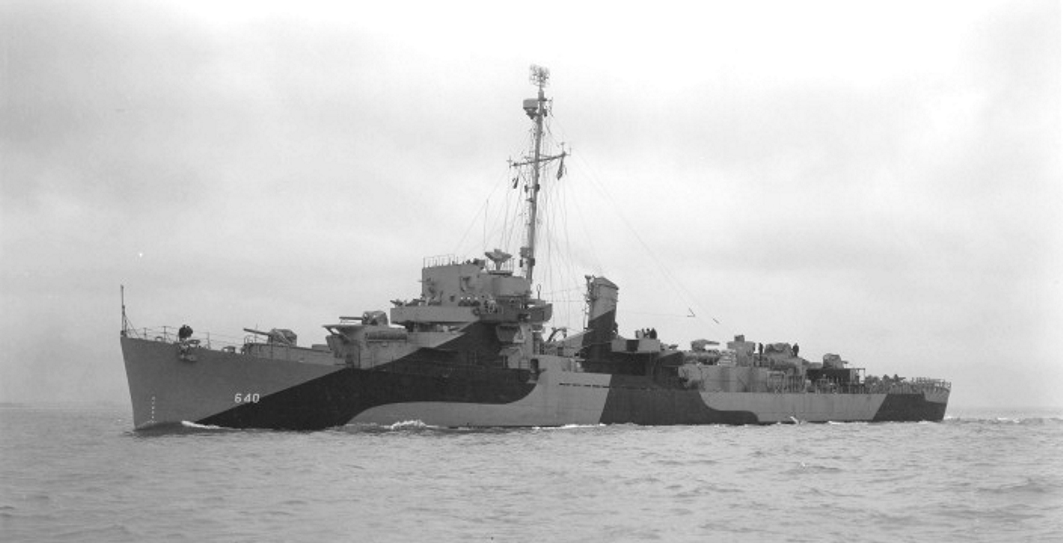

History

United States
- Name: USS Fieberling
- Namesake: Langdon K. Fieberling
- Builder: Bethlehem Shipbuilding Corporation, San Francisco
- Laid down: 19 March 1944
- Launched: 2 April 1944
- Commissioned: 11 April 1944
- Decommissioned: 13 March 1948
- Stricken: 1 March 1972
- Honors and awards: 1 battle star (World War II)
- Fate: Sold for scrap, 20 November 1972

General characteristics
- Class & type: Buckley-class destroyer escort
- Displacement: 1,400 long tons (1,422 t) standard; 1,740 long tons (1,768 t) full load
- Length: 306 ft (93 m)
- Beam: 36 ft 9 in (11.20 m)
- Draft: 13 ft 6 in (4.11 m)
- Propulsion: General Electric turbo-electric drive; 12,000 shp (8.9 MW); 2 × propellers
- Speed: 24 knots (44 km/h; 28 mph)
- Range: 4,940 nmi (9,150 km) at 12 kn (22 km/h; 14 mph)
- Complement: 15 officers, 198 men
- Armament: 3 × 3 in (76 mm) DP guns; 3 × 21 in (53 cm) torpedo tubes; 1 × quad 1.1 in (28 mm) AA gun; 8 × 20 mm cannon; 1 × hedgehog anti-submarine mortar; 2 × depth charge tracks; 8 × K-gun depth charge projectors

USS Fieberling (DE-640) was a Buckley-class destroyer escort in service with the United States Navy from 1944 to 1948. She sold for scrap in 1972.

== History ==
=== Namesake ===
The ship was named in honor of Langdon Kellogg Fieberling, born on 3 January 1910 in Oakland, California. He enlisted in the United States Naval Reserve on 7 October 1935, and after training and service as an aviation cadet, was commissioned Ensign on 1 March 1937. From 26 July 1941, he aided in establishing Torpedo Squadron 8, and when this unit was activated, served with it on the USS Hornet. When the Hornet sailed to undertake the Doolittle Raid in May 1942 half of VT-8 remained at Naval Station Norfolk in order to replace their obsolescent Douglas TBD Devastators with Grumman TBF Avengers.

The 21 aircraft detachment reached Hawaii on 29 May the day after Hornet had departed the island to fight in the Battle of Midway. Because Midway Island's airfield had some space available, Fieberling took six Avengers there. On 4 June, the first day of the battle, he led his detachment in an attack on the Imperial Japanese Navy aircraft carriers. Of the 18 men, only Ensign Albert K. Earnest and Radioman 3rd Class Harrier H. Ferrier survived. He was posthumously awarded the Navy Cross.

=== Pacific War ===
Fieberling was launched on 2 April 1944 by Bethlehem Steel Co., San Francisco, California; sponsored by Mrs. C. A. Fieberling, mother of Lieutenant Fieberling; and commissioned on 11 April 1944.

Fieberling arrived at Pearl Harbor on 27 June 1944 for escort duty to Eniwetok, making three such voyages to the staging ground for the operation until 3 September. Five days later she sailed for Manus Island, arriving 27 September. Until 15 December, she sailed out of Port Purvis on Florida Island in the Solomons on escort and air-sea rescue duty, then served as station ship at Funafuti until 17 February 1945.

After amphibious landing rehearsals at Guadalcanal, Fieberling arrived at Ulithi on 21 March 1945 to load stores and ammunition for the assault on Okinawa. She arrived off the island on 31 March, covered the landings the next day, and then served on anti-submarine patrol off the island, receiving damage from a near miss in the massive kamikaze raids of 6 April. After escorting a convoy of unloaded assault ships to Saipan between 9 and 29 April, Fieberling returned to Okinawa for patrol, escort, and radar picket duty until 28 June.

Fieberling operated on escort duty between Okinawa and Guam and Saipan until 22 October 1945, when she sailed to escort a transport from Saipan to Japan. In a near collision she was struck by the anchor of one of her escorted ships damaging one of her depth charge racks causing the charges to fall onto the deck. The quick thinking crew began stuffing the fuse breaches with wet rags to prevent any accidental discharge while securing them. They discovered that one had mistakenly never had its fuse removed. She returned to Portland, Oregon, on 22 November, and after overhaul, sailed from San Diego, California on 15 March 1946 for occupation duty off the Chinese coast. Gunners Mate Roy Bronson and another sentry watch investigated a noise coming from the forecastle. Upon discovering a civilian junk boat was attempting to steal one of their anchors the sentry retrieved a Thompson. Not wanting to kill the man he shot holes in his boat; sinking it. After bringing him aboard they returned him to shore. While on liberty in port GM Bronson witnessed a policeman shoot a man in the back of the head and walk away. "Had the policeman touched the body he would have been required to dig the hole to bury it. They'd simply leave them laying around. It was not uncommon to see dead bodies this way. Seeing them floating past the ship was an almost daily occurrence." Back in San Diego on 13 August, she operated along the west coast and in the Hawaiian Islands, testing experimental equipment, until decommissioned on 13 March 1948 and placed in reserve at San Diego.

Stricken from the Naval Vessel Register on 1 March 1972, Fieberling was sold for scrap on 20 November of that same year.

== Awards ==
Fieberling received one battle star for World War II service.
