= VT-8 =

Torpedo Squadron 8
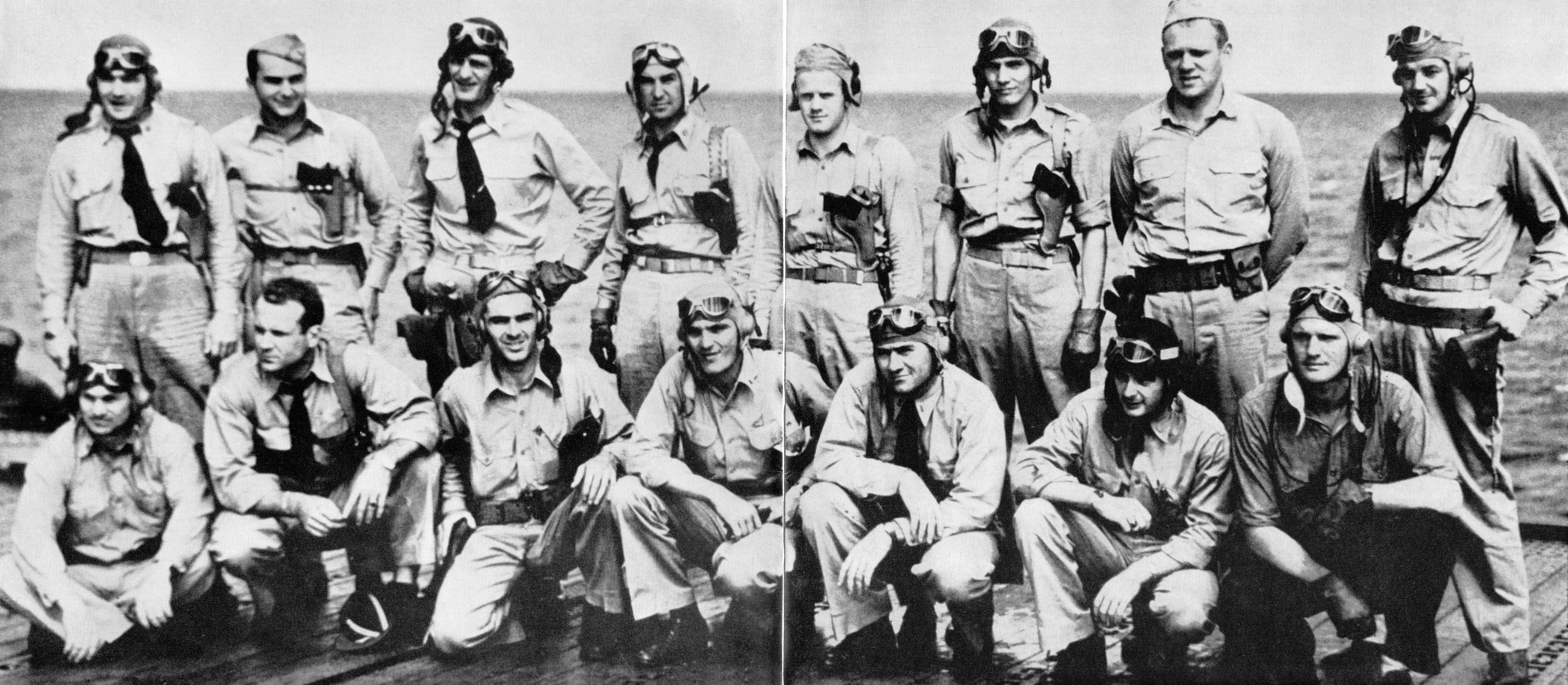
- Lieutenant Commander John C. Waldron's Douglas TBD Devastator pilots on USS Hornet in May 1942. Standing (L-R): Owens, Fayle (transferred), Waldron, R. A. Moore, U. M. Moore, Evans, Teats, Campbell. Kneeling (L-R): Ellison, Kenyon, Gray, Gay, Woodson, Creamer, Miles.
- Active: 1942–1945
- Country: United States
- Branch: United States Navy
- Type: Attack
- Role: Close air support Air interdiction
- Part of: Hornet Air Group, later Carrier Air Group 8
- Engagements: World War II: Battle of Midway; Battle of Guadalcanal
- Decorations: Presidential Unit Citation

Commanders
- Notable commanders: John C. Waldron; Harold H. Larsen

Aircraft flown
- Attack: Douglas TBD Devastator; Grumman TBM Avenger

Torpedo Squadron 8 (VT-8) was a United States Navy squadron of World War II torpedo bombers. VT-8 was assigned initially to the air group of the aircraft carrier USS Hornet, joining the ship shortly after her commissioning in October 1941.

After heavy losses in the Battle of Midway, VT-8 was assigned to USS Saratoga. When Saratoga was disabled on 31 August, VT-8 was transferred to Henderson Field on Guadalcanal, operating there until November 1942. Due to heavy cumulative losses on Guadalcanal, VT-8 was then withdrawn and disbanded.

A second VT-8 was established in 1943, and served on USS Bunker Hill until the end of the war.

== Midway ==
Torpedo Squadron 8, a 1942 film by John Ford

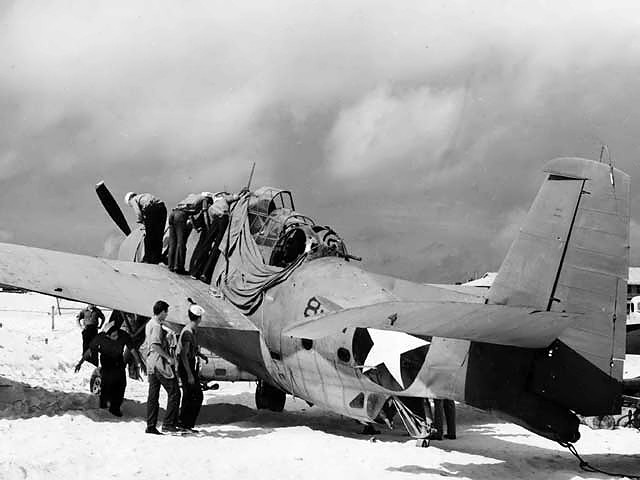
The damaged Grumman TBF Avenger piloted by Bert Earnest, photographed at Midway on June 24, 1942

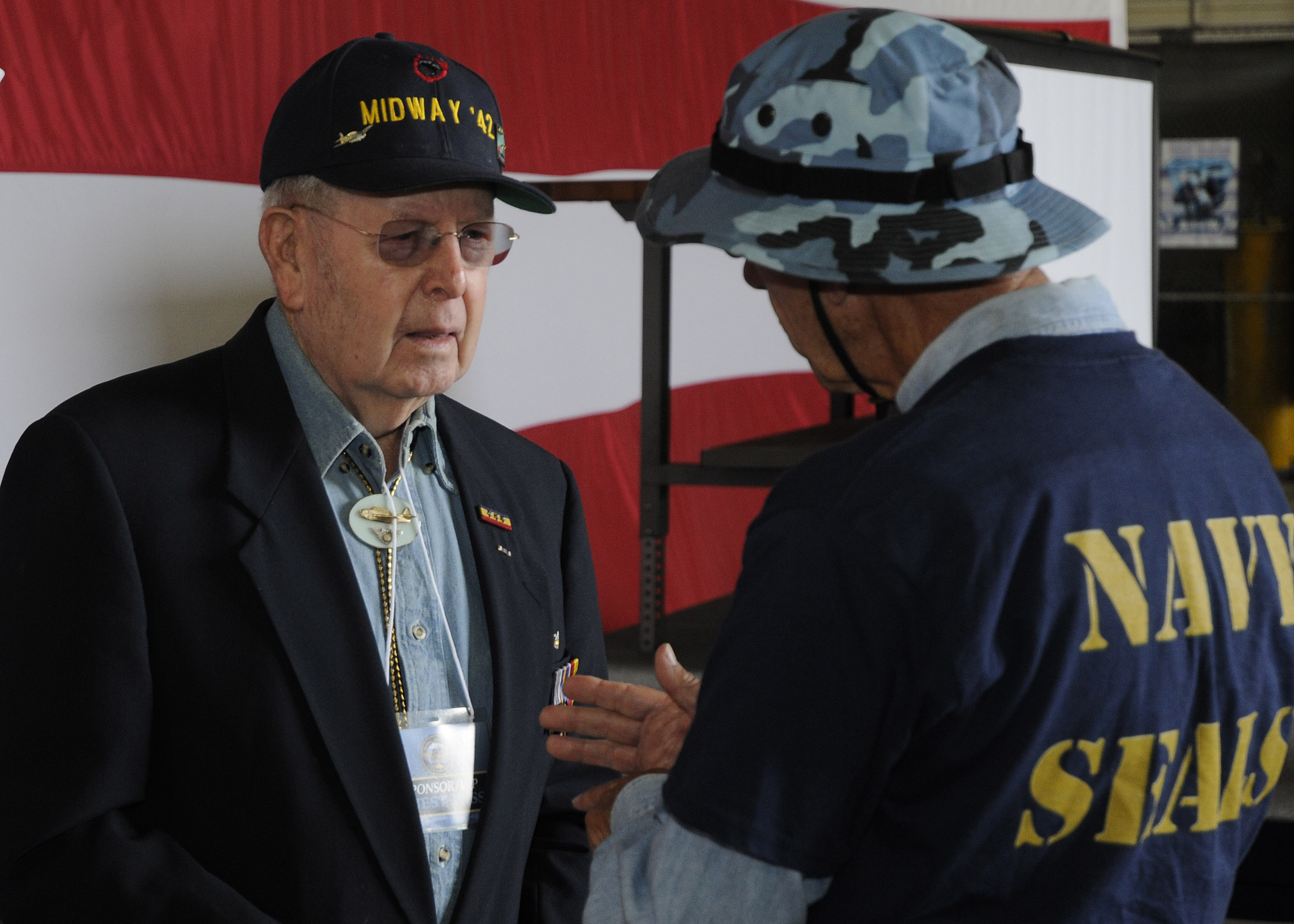
Radioman 2nd Class Harry Ferrier (1925–2016), one of the three VT-8 survivors of the Battle of Midway, talks with an audience member during the Centennial of Naval Aviation celebration at Naval Air Station Whidbey Island in 2011

VT-8's first and best-known combat mission came during the Battle of Midway on 4 June 1942. All 15 of Lieutenant Commander John C. Waldron's obsolete Douglas TBD Devastators were shot down during their unescorted torpedo attack on Imperial Japanese Navy aircraft carriers. The squadron failed to damage any Japanese carriers or destroy enemy aircraft. Only one member of VT-8 who flew from Hornet on that day survived in the action: Ensign George Gay, who was rescued the day following the battle.

Just prior to the Battle of Midway, the reconstituted VT-8 was the first squadron equipped with the new Grumman TBF-1 Avenger, a bigger, faster, longer-ranged replacement for the TBD. When Hornet sailed to the Pacific, a detachment of the squadron under the command of Lieutenant Harold "Swede" Larsen remained in Norfolk, Virginia to receive the first shipment of the new aircraft. Larsen's detachment arrived at Pearl Harbor the day after Hornet sailed for Midway Island. Six of the squadron's Avengers were flown to Midway under the command of Lieutenant Langdon K. Fieberling to participate in the battle. Flying with LT Fieberling were his navigator, Ens Jack Wilke, and gunner, RM2 Ray Osborn. These planes were the first Navy aircraft to attack the Japanese fleet that day. They attacked without fighter cover, and five of six the Avengers were shot down. Only Ensign Albert K. Earnest and Radioman 2nd Class Harry Ferrier survived, on a badly shot-up plane with damaged controls and landing gear, and a dead rear-gunner.

VT-8's losses have been attributed to several causes. Hornet's CAG, Commander Stanhope C. Ring, kept the group's fighter escort at high altitude in order to cover the dive bombers and to give the Wildcats an altitude advantage. This decision was supported by future Admiral Marc Mitscher, then commanding officer of Hornet. The Wildcats' deployment was ultimately of no consequence, however, as Ring led the group on an incorrect heading, so the dive bombers never made contact with the Japanese fleet. Lieutenant Commander Waldron made repeated attempts to take over the formation by radio before leading VT-8 off on his own. Waldron's initiative coupled with Ring's faulty tactics led to VT-8 attacking the Japanese force without fighter or dive bomber support. All of the US carrier-based torpedo squadrons suffered heavily in the battle, including VT-3, which attacked with fighter escort. Although scoring no hits, VT-8 still played a pivotal role as their attack had forced the Japanese carriers to maneuver radically, delaying the launching of the planned strike against the American carriers. After further separate attacks by the remaining two torpedo squadrons over the next hour, Japanese fighter cover and air defense coordination had become focused on low-altitude defense. This left the Japanese carriers exposed to the late-arriving SBD Dauntless dive bombers from Yorktown and Enterprise, which attacked from high altitude. The dive bombers fatally damaged three of the four Japanese carriers, changing the course of the battle.

Larsen's detachment of VT-8 that remained at Pearl Harbor was loaded aboard USS Saratoga when she was sent to reinforce the forces at Midway. They were later transferred to Hornet where they learned of the loss of their comrades. VT-8 was reconstituted with this detachment as nucleus and was reassigned to Saratoga.

== South Pacific ==
VT-8 flew from Saratoga during the initial stages of the Guadalcanal campaign. In the Battle of the Eastern Solomons, VT-8 assisted in sinking the light carrier Ryūjō. When Saratoga was torpedoed by a Japanese submarine, the squadron was assigned to Henderson Field on Guadalcanal, where it served as part of the Cactus Air Force. VTR-8 fought there to the point where all aircraft were disabled, and then operated as a single-aircraft unit, as one plane at a time was put back into service by salvaging parts (often themselves damaged) from other planes. VT-8 pilots and air crew also participated in the ground defense of Henderson Field, assisting to fend off Japanese infantry attacks on 24–26 October 1942. VT-8's last official mission was flown on 15 November 1942, against damaged transports from the last major Japanese convoy to the island. After leaving Guadalcanal and returning to the United States, the squadron was disbanded.

== Central Pacific ==
A new Torpedo Squadron 8 was established in 1943 as part of the new Carrier Air Group 8 (CVG-8). It was assigned to the newly commissioned aircraft carrier Intrepid at Norfolk in November 1943. After training in the Caribbean Sea, VT-8 left Intrepid at Pearl Harbor in January 1944. Here, VT-8 was assigned to USS Bunker Hill, in March 1944. VT-8 attacked Palau, Yap, Ulithi, and Woleai on 30 March and 1 April 1944. Truk, Satawan, Ponape, and Hollandia on New Guinea were attacked a month later. CVG-8 then took part in the Marianas Campaign between 12 June and 10 August 1944. VT-8 flew sorties in the Battle of the Philippine Sea and the Battle of Leyte Gulf. The Western Carolines were attacked in September, Okinawa, Luzon, and Formosa were attacked in October and November 1944. For this deployment on Bunker Hill, CVG-8 was awarded a Presidential Unit Citation.

In June 1945, VT-8 trained with USS Saratoga, but they did not deploy. CVG-8 (including VT-8) was disestablished after the end of the war.

== Awards ==
Torpedo Eight earned two Presidential Unit Citations: one for Midway and one for Guadalcanal. Its members also earned more than fifty medals for valor in combat.

== Gallery ==
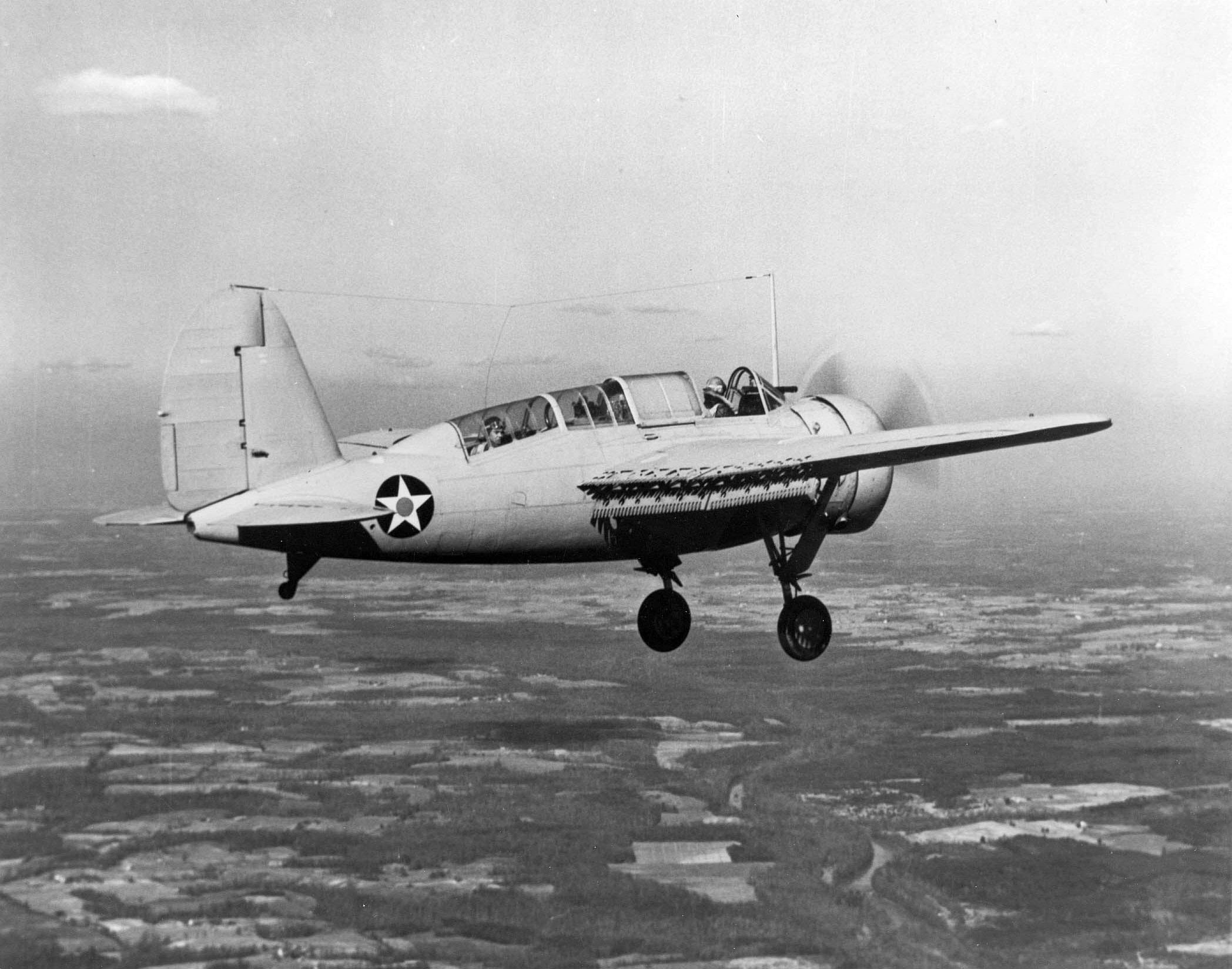
A VT-8 SBN-1 trainer, 1941

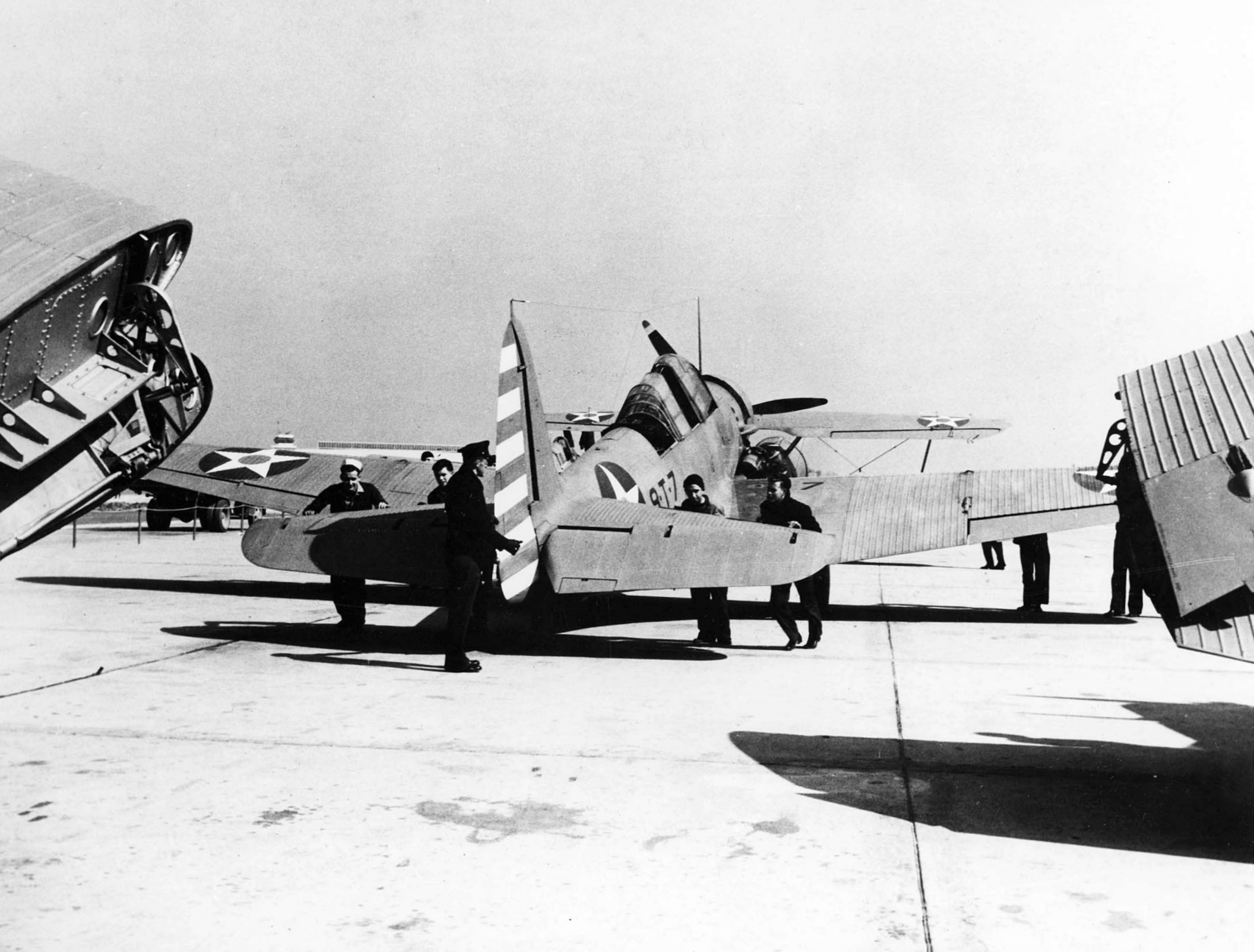
"8-T-7" at NAS Norfolk in March 1942

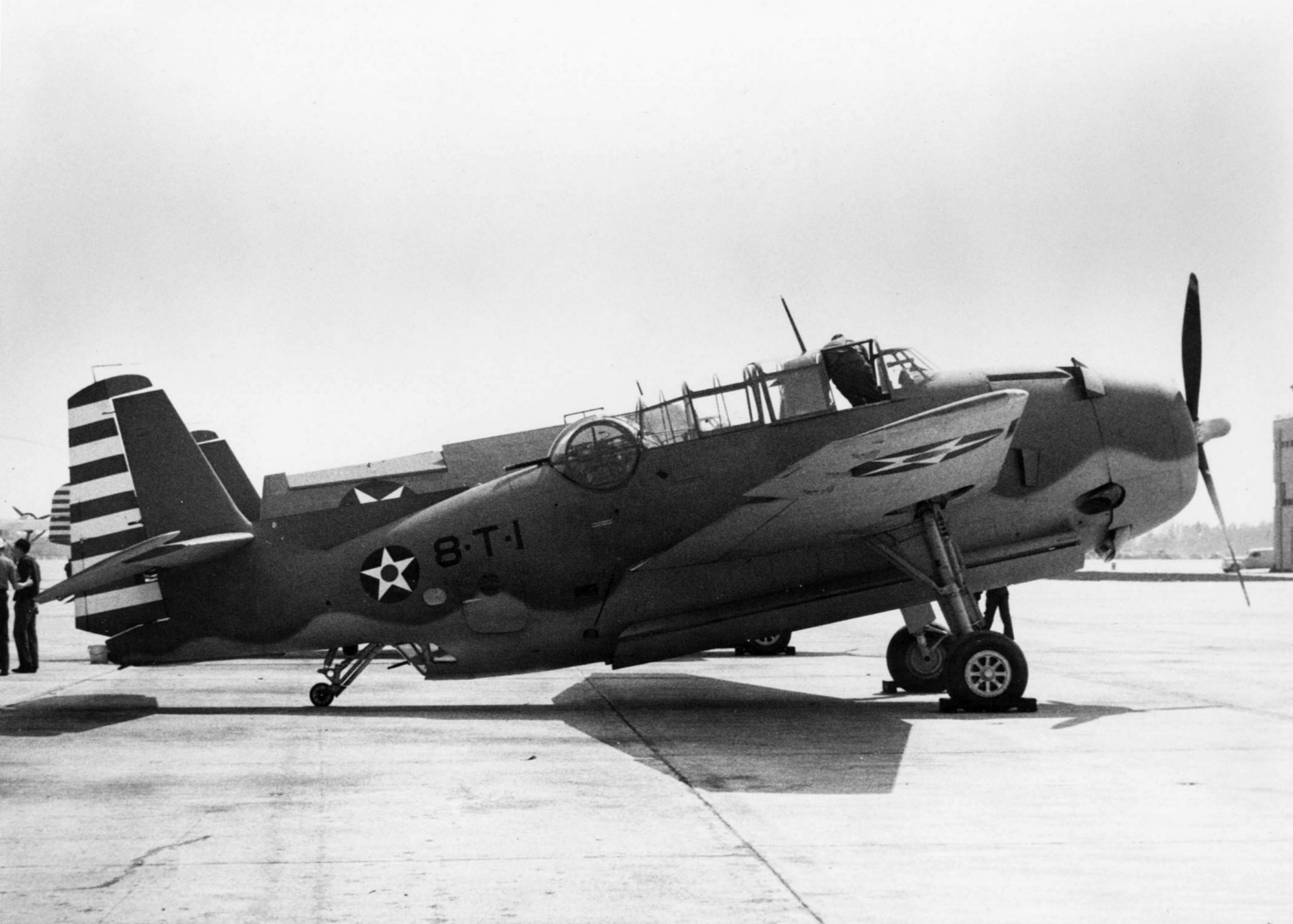
VT-8 was the first squadron equipped with the new TBF-1

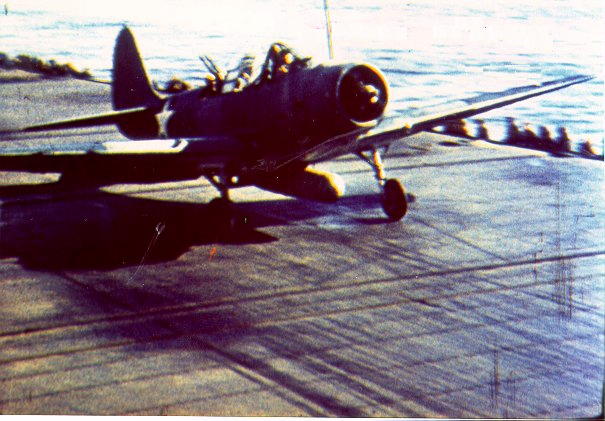
VT-8 CO LCdr. Waldron taking off

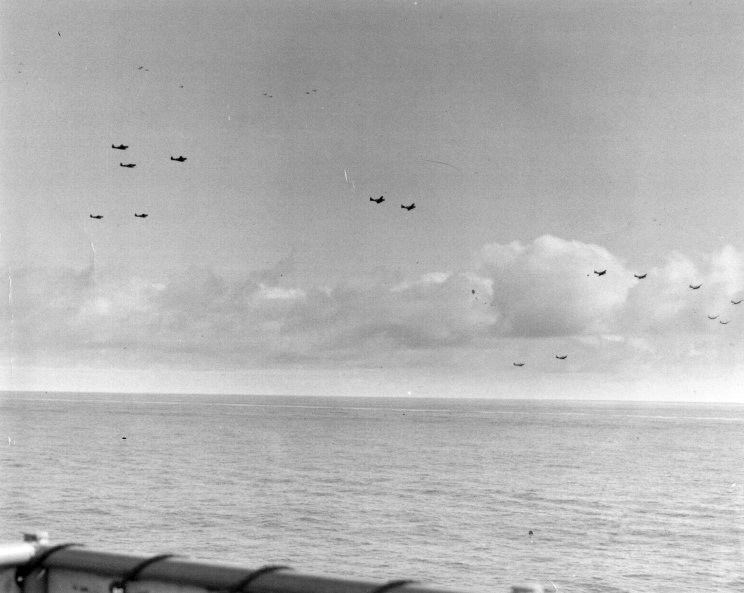
VT-8 in flight

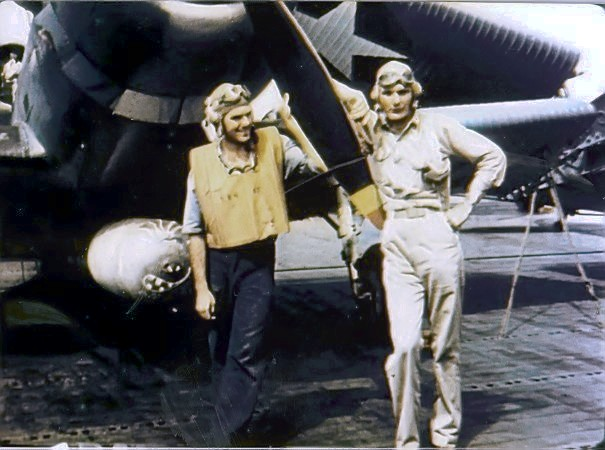
Ens. Gay (right), sole survivor of Devastator attack at Midway

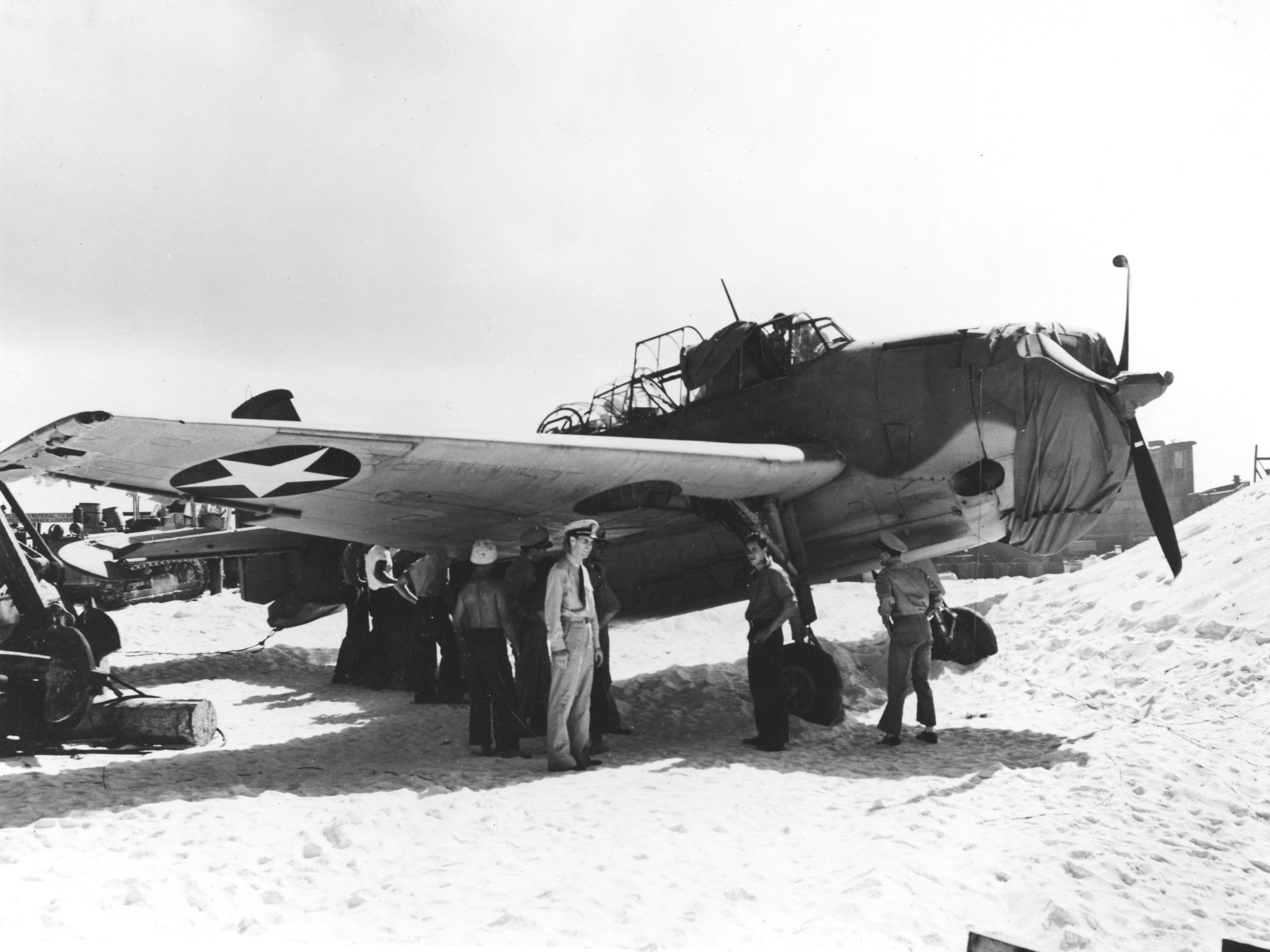
8-T-1, the only VT-8 TBF to return to Midway

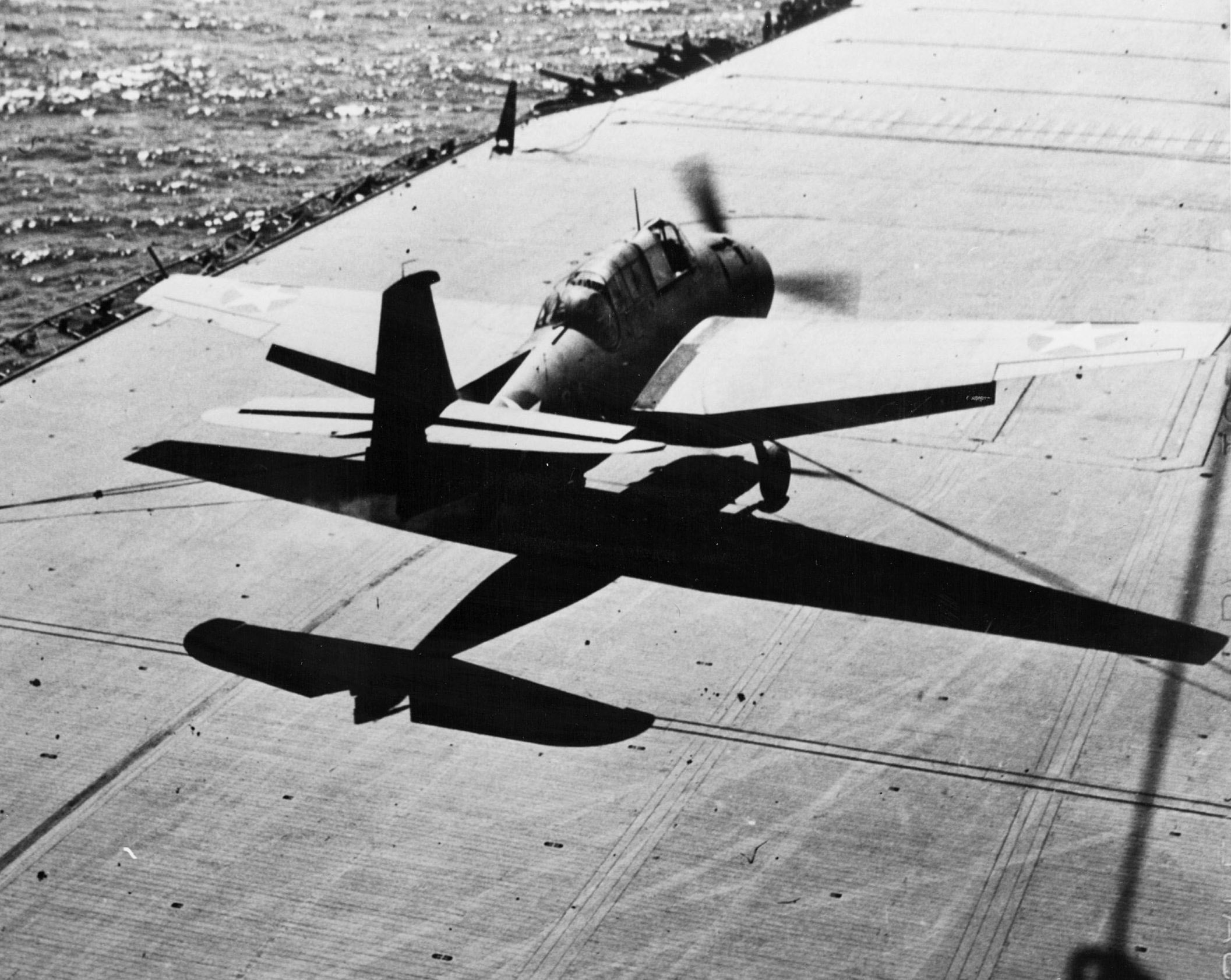
A VT-8 TBF landing on USS Saratoga off Guadalcanal, August 1942

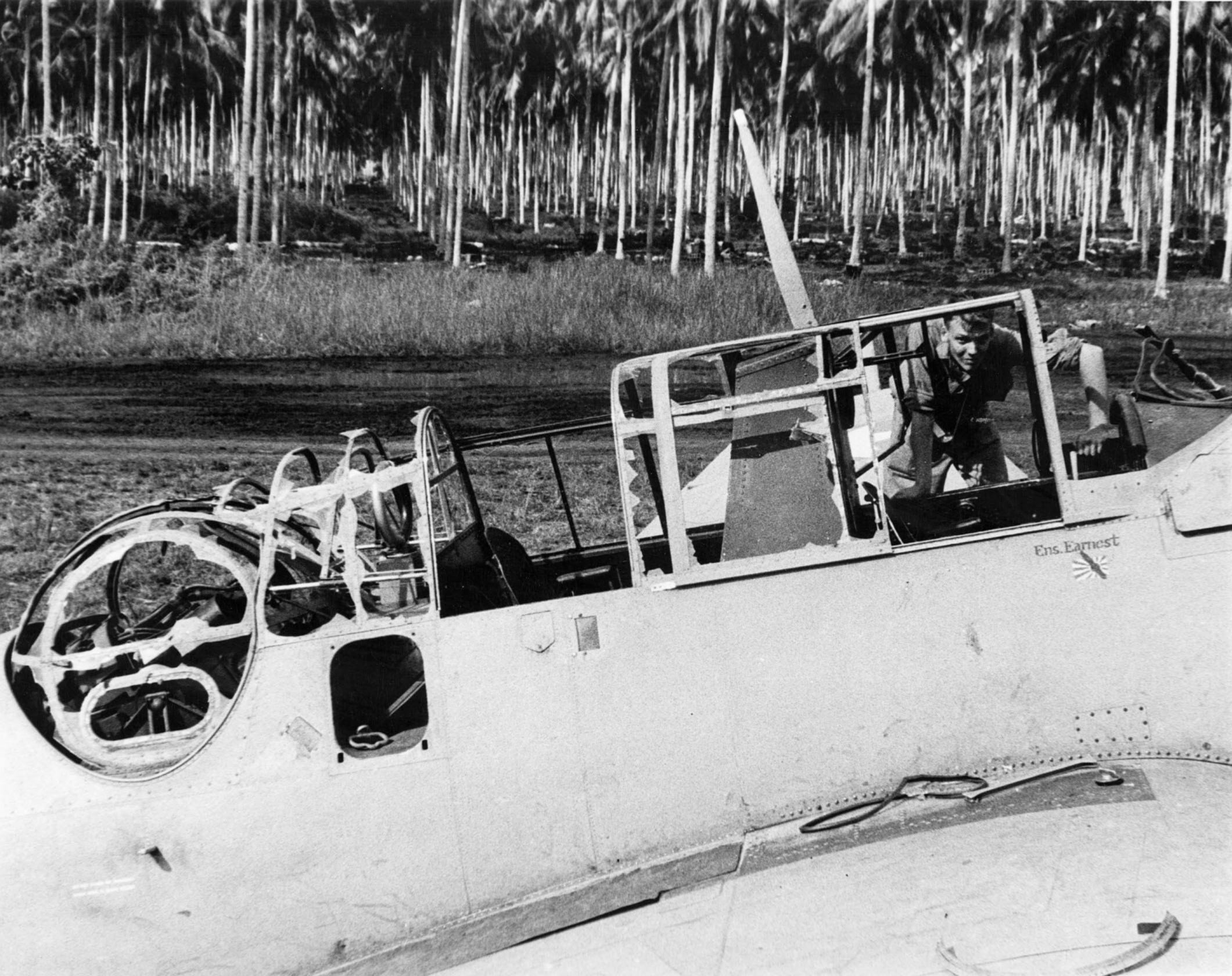
The wrecked TBF of Ens. Earnest on Guadalcanal, November 1942

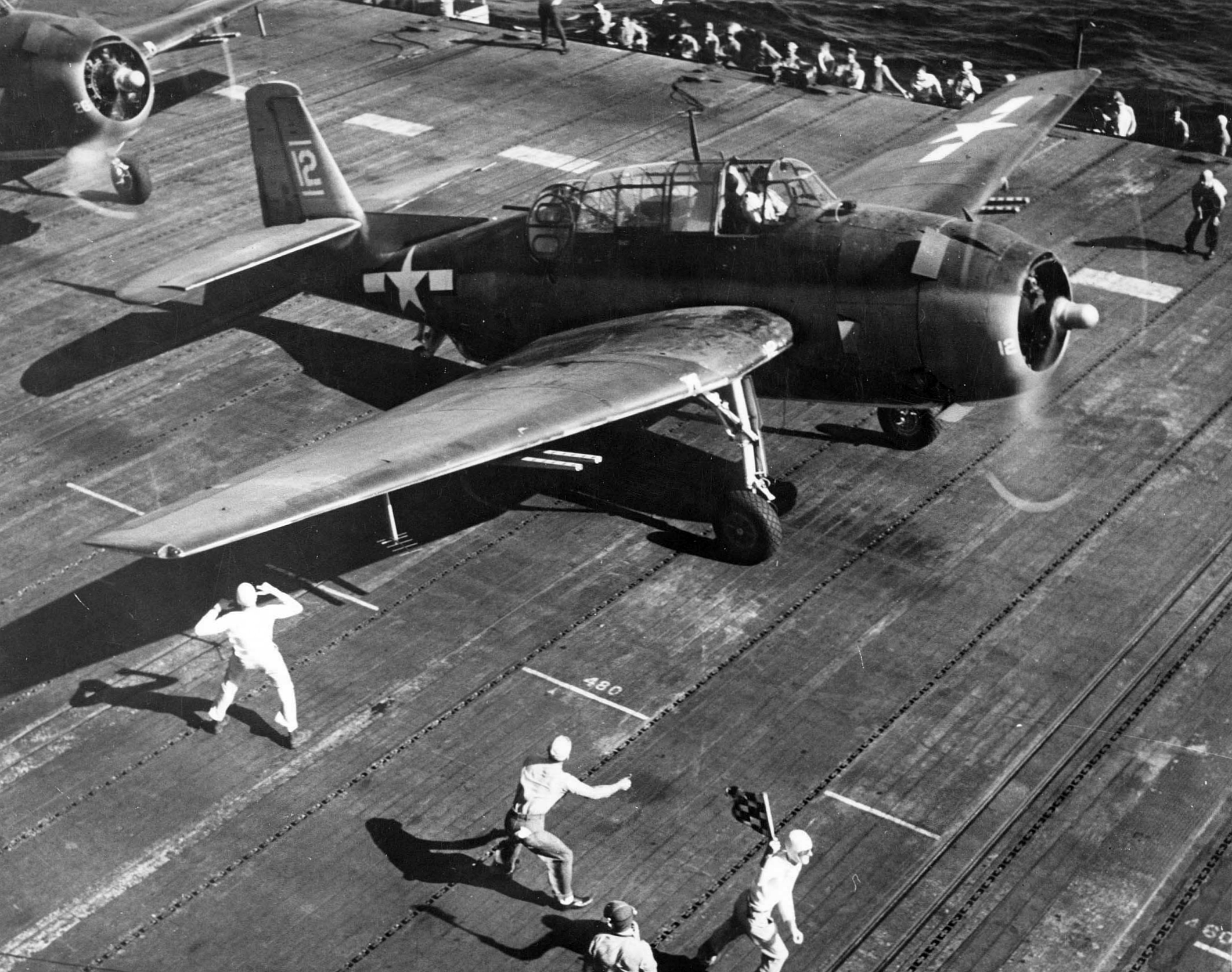
A VT-8 Avenger on USS Bunker Hill off Saipan, June 1944

== Literature ==
Herman Wouk's novel War and Remembrance pays tribute to Torpedo 8, whose pilots he called "the soul of America in action."

Robert J Mrazek's book "A Dawn Like Thunder: The True Story of Torpedo Squadron Eight" tells the story of VT-8 through interviews with surviving members, the official war record of the squadron and excerpts from letters written home by those who didn't make it.
