= George H. Gay Jr. =

United States Navy officer (1917–1994)

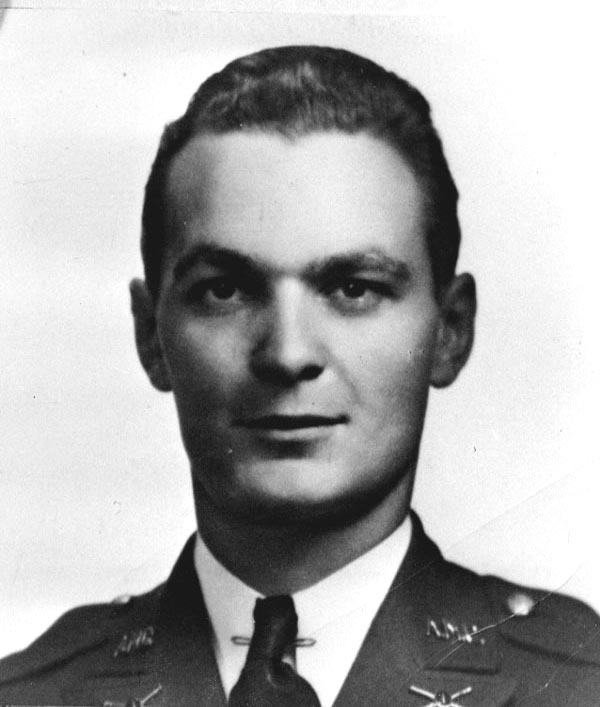
- George H. Gay circa 1936–1938
- Born: March 8, 1917; Waco, Texas, U.S.
- Died: October 21, 1994 (aged 77); Marietta, Georgia, U.S.
- Military career
- Allegiance: United States of America
- Branch: U.S. Navy
- Service years: 1941–1945
- Rank: Lieutenant commander
- Units: Torpedo Squadron 8
- Conflicts: World War II: Battle of Midway; Guadalcanal campaign
- Awards: Navy Cross; Purple Heart

Ensign (later Lieutenant Commander) George Henry Gay Jr. (March 8, 1917 – October 21, 1994) was a Douglas TBD Devastator pilot in United States Navy (USN) Torpedo Squadron 8 operating from the aircraft carrier USS Hornet in the Pacific Theater of Operations during World War II. Of the 30 VT-8 aircrew from Hornet that participated in the pivotal Battle of Midway, Gay was the sole survivor, though the squadron's attack on the Imperial Japanese Navy (IJN) carriers delayed the launching of a planned strike against the American carriers, enabling other USN planes to sink four of the IJN's seven fleet carriers then in service.

== Early years ==
Gay was born on March 8, 1917, in Waco, Texas. He attended school in both Austin and Houston before enrolling at the Agricultural and Mechanical College of Texas (now Texas A&M University).

== World War II ==
Like millions of Americans at the time, Gay chose to sign up for the coming war, leaving school. He tried to join the Army Air Corps as a pilot but was rejected for medical reasons. He then tried the United States Navy in early 1941. Gay completed flight training and was commissioned as an ensign in September 1941.

He joined the newly formed Torpedo Squadron 8 under Lieutenant Commander John Charles Waldron. He and his unit were aboard the aircraft carrier USS Hornet in April 1942 when Lieutenant Colonel Jimmy Doolittle launched his raid on Tokyo. One week later, Hornet arrived at Pearl Harbor to join USS Enterprise as part of Task Force 16 during the Battle of Midway.

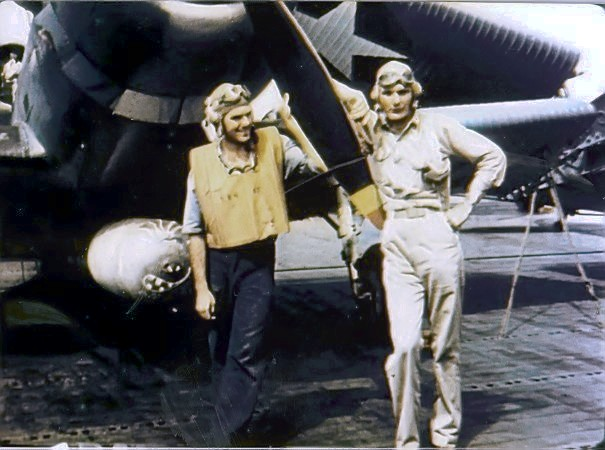
Ensign George H. Gay Jr. (right), sole survivor of VT-8's TBD Devastator group at June 1942 Battle of Midway, in front of his aircraft with his rear gunner, ARM3c George Arthur Field, while Hornet was in the Coral Sea, c. May 1942.

During the Battle of Midway, Gay was the first of his squadron to take off from Hornet on June 4, 1942. Gay's squadron found the Japanese fleet and launched an attack without any fighter plane support. Although he was wounded and his radioman/gunner, Robert K. Huntington, was dying, Gay completed his torpedo attack on the Japanese aircraft carrier Sōryū, but Sōryū evaded his torpedo. Rather than banking away from the ship and presenting a larger target to its anti-aircraft gunners, Gay continued in toward the carrier at low altitude. He then brought his Devastator into a tight turn as he approached the carrier's island, and flew aft along the flight deck's length, thus evading anti-aircraft fire. He later stated he had a "split second" thought of crashing into the Japanese aircraft he saw being serviced on the flight deck.

It's when a fellow is just gone and knows it, it is just crash into the ship or crash into the sea, and you have enough control to do a little bit more damage, why you crash into the ship.

— George H. Gay

With his aircraft still in relatively good condition, he decided to make for Hornet after clearing the Japanese carrier. However, five Mitsubishi A6M Zeros brought his aircraft down in a hail of machine-gun and cannon fire, killing his rear gunner.

Exiting his aircraft, and floating in the ocean, he hid under his seat cushion for hours to avoid Japanese strafing attacks and witnessed the subsequent dive bombing attacks and sinking of three of the four Japanese aircraft carriers.

After dark, Gay felt it was safe to inflate his life raft. He was rescued by a Navy Consolidated PBY Catalina after spending over 30 hours in the water. Gay was later flown to USS Vincennes (arriving June 28, 1942), before being transferred home. Of the squadron's thirty pilots and radiomen, Gay was the only survivor.

Gay later met with Admiral Nimitz and confirmed the destruction of three Japanese carriers he had witnessed – Akagi, Kaga and Sōryū. He was featured in the August 31, 1942, issue of Life magazine.

Following Midway, Gay took part in the Guadalcanal campaign with Torpedo Squadron 11, and later became a Navy flight instructor.

He was awarded the Navy Cross and Purple Heart for his actions in combat at Midway and was later awarded an Air Medal.

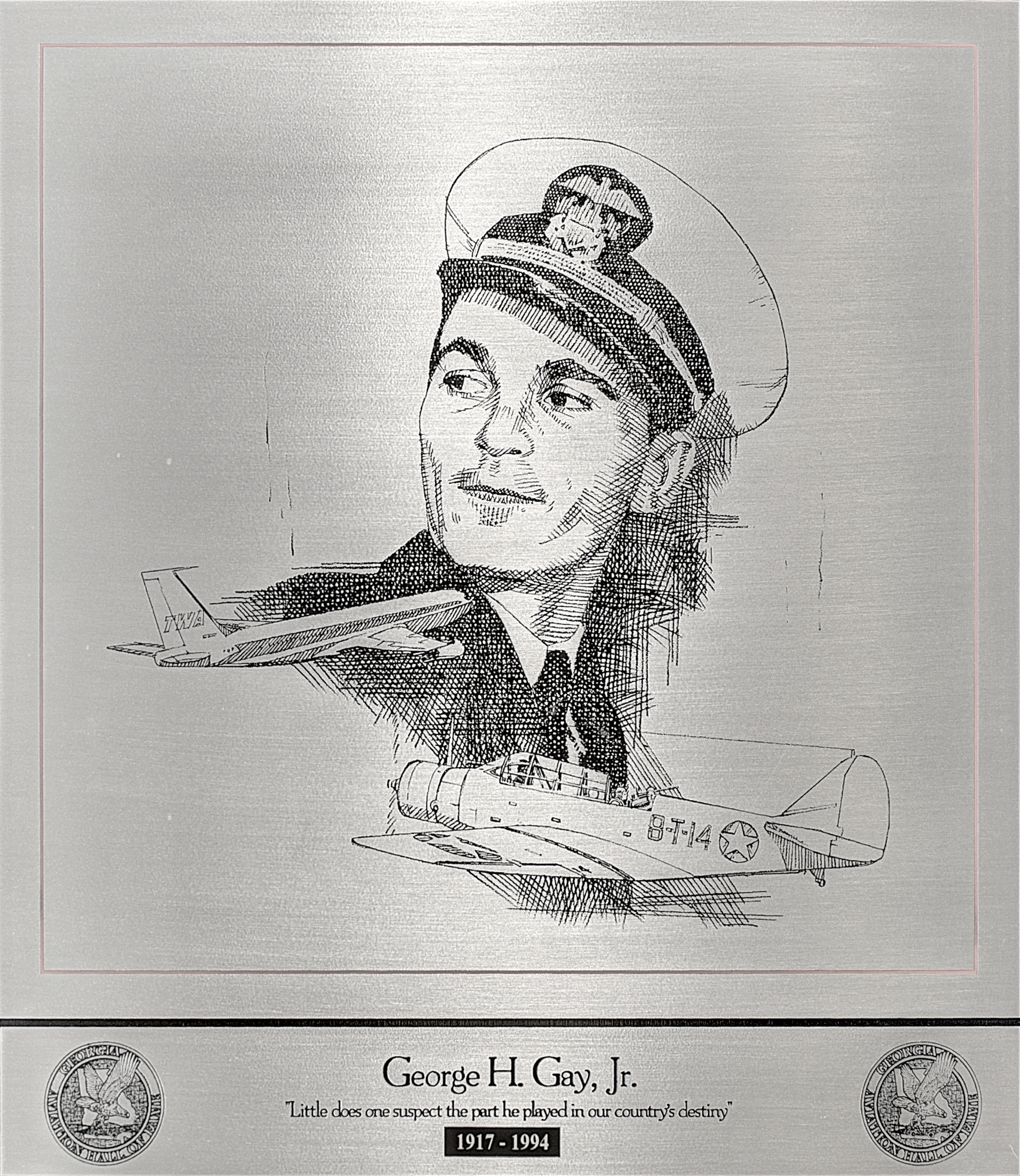
Plaque of Gay at the Georgia Aviation Hall of Fame

== Later years ==
After World War II, Gay spent over 30 years as a pilot for Trans World Airlines. He often lectured on his Midway experiences, and authored the book Sole Survivor. In 1975, he served as a consultant on the set for the movie Midway, in which Kevin Dobson played Gay. In the 2019 film Midway, he was portrayed by Brandon Sklenar.

He attended the decommissioning ceremony of USS Midway on April 11, 1992.

In May 1994 Gay was named to the Georgia Aviation Hall of Fame.

On October 21, 1994, Gay died of a heart attack at a hospital in Marietta, Georgia. His body was cremated and his ashes spread at the place where Torpedo Squadron 8 had launched its ill-fated attack.

== Awards ==
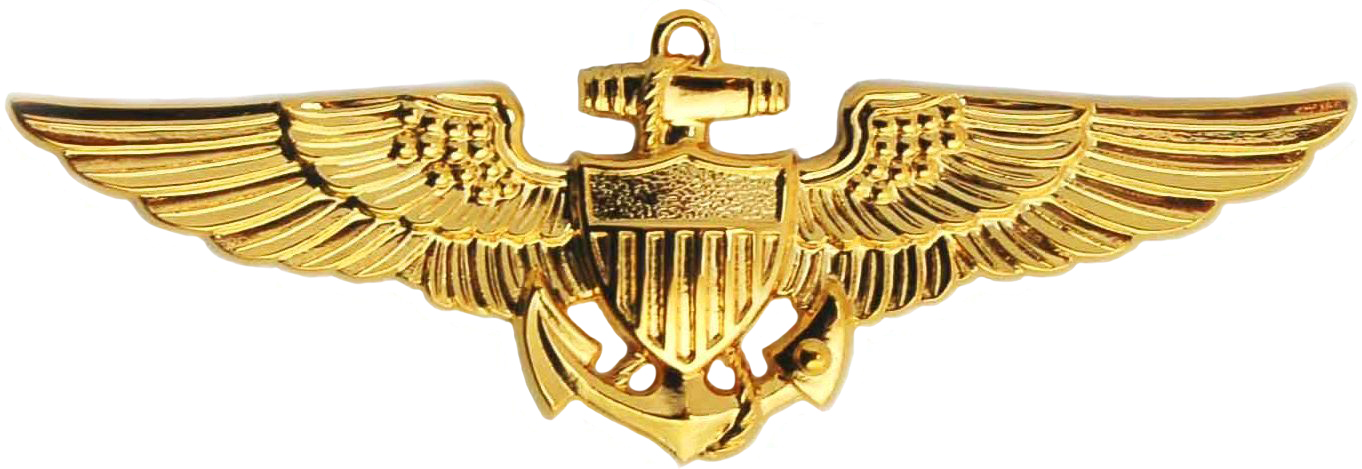

Naval Aviator Badge
Navy Cross
Purple Heart	Air Medal	Combat Action Ribbon
Navy Presidential Unit Citation	American Defense Service Medal w/ one 3/16" bronze star	American Campaign Medal
Asiatic–Pacific Campaign Medal w/ three 3/16" bronze stars	World War II Victory Medal	Armed Forces Reserve Medal

=== Navy Cross citation ===

Ensign George Henry Gay, Jr
U.S. Navy
Date Of Action: June 4, 1942

The President of the United States of America takes pleasure in presenting the Navy Cross to Ensign George Henry Gay, Jr., United States Naval Reserve, for extraordinary heroism in operations against the enemy while serving as Pilot of a carrier-based Navy Torpedo Plane of Torpedo Squadron EIGHT (VT-8), attached to the U.S.S. HORNET (CV-8), during the "Air Battle of Midway," against enemy Japanese forces on 4 June 1942. Grimly aware of the hazardous consequences of flying without fighter protection, and with insufficient fuel to return to his carrier, Ensign Gay, resolutely, and with no thought of his own life, delivered an effective torpedo attached against violent assaults of enemy Japanese aircraft and against an almost solid barrage of anti-aircraft fire. His courageous action, carried out with a gallant spirit of self-sacrifice and a conscientious devotion to the fulfillment of his mission, was a determining factor in the defeat of the enemy forces and was in keeping with the highest traditions of the United States Naval Service.
