= John C. Waldron =

United States Navy officer (1900–1942)

John Charles Waldron
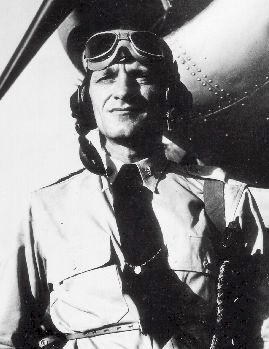
- LCDR John C. Waldron
- Born: August 24, 1900; Fort Pierre, South Dakota, U.S.
- Died: June 4, 1942 (aged 41) near Midway Atoll
- Military career
- Allegiance: United States of America
- Branch: United States Navy
- Service years: 1924–1942
- Rank: Lieutenant commander
- Commands: Torpedo Squadron 8
- Conflicts: World War II: Battle of Midway
- Awards: Navy Cross; Presidential Unit Citation (US); Purple Heart

John Charles Waldron (August 24, 1900 – June 4, 1942) was a United States Navy (USN) aviator who led a squadron of torpedo bombers, Torpedo Squadron 8 aboard USS Hornet, in World War II. While he was among the 29 men of the 30-man squadron who perished in the Battle of Midway, his decision to attack the Imperial Japanese Navy (IJN) carriers delayed the launching of a planned strike against the American carriers, enabling other USN planes to sink four of the IJN's seven fleet carriers then in service.

== Birth and early life ==
Waldron was born on August 24, 1900 at Fort Pierre, South Dakota, son of rancher Charles Westbrook Waldron and Jane Van Metre grandson of lawyer and probate Judge George Prentiss Waldron, and a sixth great nephew of Richard Waldron. He was of colonial New Hampshire families on his father's side, and of Oglala Lakota and Southerner background on his mother's side. His family immigrated to Canada when he was a child and homesteaded near Lashburn, Saskatchewan, where he spent his youth before returning to the USA. In the midst of his armed forces career he married Adelaide Wentworth and had two daughters. He studied law and was admitted to the bar, but never practiced. World War II Navy Commander George Philip Jr., a Navy Cross recipient and namesake of USS George Philip (FFG-12), was the son of Waldron's sister Alice Island Waldron.

== Naval aviation training and shore duty ==
He received an appointment as midshipman from his home state on June 16, 1920, and graduated with the United States Naval Academy Class of 1924. Following his initial sea duty aboard Seattle (CA-11), Waldron went to Naval Air Station Pensacola, Florida, where he received his wings in the summer of 1927. Over the ensuing months, Waldron flew with torpedo squadrons (VT-1S and VT-9S and received his promotion to lieutenant, junior grade, on February 16, 1928. He served at the Naval Academy from May 24 to September 13, 1929, where he instructed midshipmen in the field of aviation. Then, after duty as an instructor at the NAS Pensacola, between October 1929 and June 1931, Waldron went to sea again, this time with Scouting Squadron 3B (VS-3B), based aboard Lexington (CV-2), reporting for duty on July 1, 1931.

Waldron flew observation aircraft off Colorado (BB-45), before he joined Patrol Squadron 1B (VP-1B), Battle Force, for a brief period in late 1936. Subsequently flying from Saratoga (CV-3) with Fighting Squadron 3 (VF-3) until the early summer of 1939, he reported back to NAS Pensacola, for further instructor's duty on June 27, 1939. Waldron then served three successive tours of shore duty, all involving flying, at the Naval Proving Ground, Dahlgren, Va.; the Bureau of Ordnance, Washington, D.C.; and finally the 3rd Naval District, where he was appointed naval inspector of ordnance at the plant of Carl L. Norden, Inc., in New York City—makers of the famed Norden bombsight. Detached from that duty in the summer of 1941, Lieutenant Commander Waldron took command of the newly formed Torpedo Squadron 8 (VT-8), part of the embryonic air group being assembled for the new fleet carrier Hornet (CV-8) at Newport News, Virginia. The Pearl Harbor attack, though, meant that his training of his men had to be intensive.

== At Midway ==
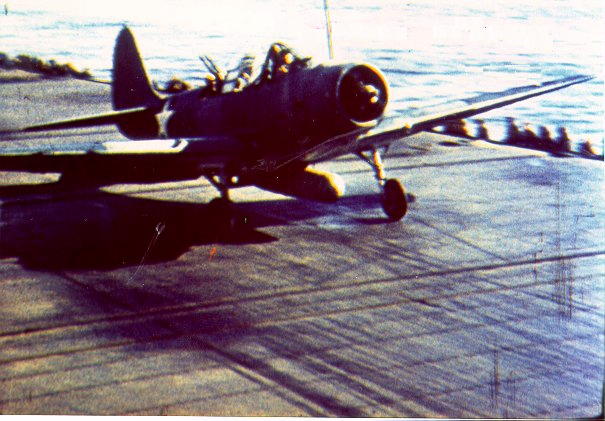
Waldron's TBD Devastator taking off from USS Hornet on 4 June 1942. He and his gunner, Chief Radioman Horace F. Dobbs, were killed that day

"Torpedo 8" did not engage in combat, however, until nearly 10 months after it had been commissioned at Norfolk. Too late to take part in the Battle of the Coral Sea, VT-8 would engage at the turning point of the Pacific War—the Battle of Midway. In the first few days of June 1942, preceding that battle, VT-8 was on board the carrier as she steamed from Pearl Harbor toward the American carrier assembly point northeast of Midway known as "Point Luck." On the eve of the battle, Commander Waldron called his men together and distributed a mimeographed plan of attack. He concluded by saying that if worst came to worst, he wanted each man to do his utmost to destroy the enemy. "If there is only one plane left to make a final run-in," he told his men, "I want that man to go in and get a hit. May God be with us all. Good luck, happy landings, and give 'em hell."

The next day, June 4, the 15 Douglas TBD-1 Devastators of VT-8 launched from Hornet's flight deck in search of the enemy. Before takeoff, LCDR Waldron had a dispute with the Hornet's Commander, Air Group, Stanhope C. Ring, and Hornet CO Marc Mitscher about where the Japanese carriers would be found. Despite having a contact report showing the Japanese southwest of Hornet, Mitscher and Ring ordered the flight to take a course due west, in the hopes of spotting a possible trailing group of carriers. Waldron argued for a course based on the contact report, but was overruled. Once in the air, Waldron attempted to take control of the Hornet strike group by radio. Failing that, he soon split his squadron off and led his unit directly to the Japanese carrier group. Waldron, leading the first carrier planes to approach the Japanese carriers (somewhat after 9:00AM local time, over an hour before the American dive bombers would arrive), was aware of the lack of fighter protection, but nevertheless committed Torpedo 8 to battle. Without fighter escort, underpowered, with limited defensive armament, and forced by the unreliability of their own torpedoes to fly low and slow directly at their targets, the Hornet torpedo planes received the undivided attention of the enemy's combat air patrol of Mitsubishi Zero fighters. All 15 planes were shot down. Of the 30 men who set out that morning, only one—Ensign George H. Gay, Jr., USNR—survived. However, Torpedo 8's attack had forced the Japanese carriers to maneuver radically, delaying the launching of the planned strike against the American carriers. After further separate attacks by the remaining two torpedo squadrons over the next hour, Japanese fighter cover and air defense coordination had become focused on low-altitude defense. This left the Japanese carriers exposed to the late-arriving SBD Dauntless dive bombers from Yorktown and Enterprise, which attacked from high altitude. The dive bombers fatally damaged three of the four Japanese carriers, changing the course of the battle.

=== Legacy ===
On March 5, 1943, NOLF Waldron was named after LCDR Waldron in his honor. Additionally, an Allen M. Sumner-class destroyer was named after him, known as USS Waldron.

Torpedo 8 earned the Presidential Unit Citation. Lieutenant Commander Waldron received the Navy Cross posthumously, as well as a share of the unit citation. Waldron was portrayed by actor Glenn Corbett in the 1976 film Midway.

== Awards and honors ==
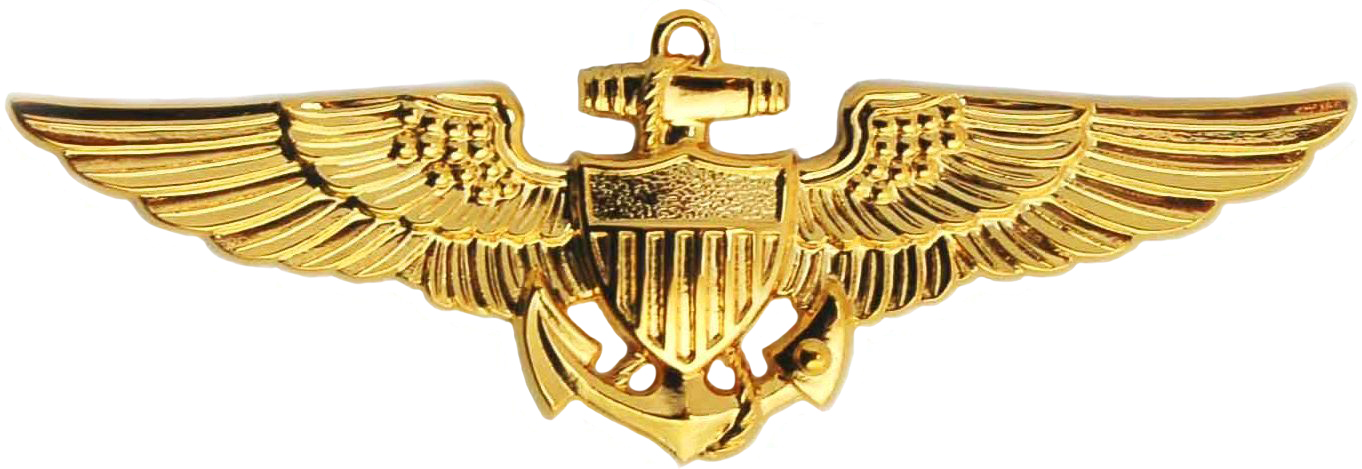

Naval Aviator Badge
Navy Cross
Purple Heart	Navy Presidential Unit Citation	American Defense Service Medal w/ one 3/16" bronze star
American Campaign Medal	Asiatic–Pacific Campaign Medal w/ 3/16" bronze star	World War II Victory Medal

=== Navy Cross citation ===

Lieutenant Commander John Charles Waldron
U.S. Navy
Date Of Action: June 4, 1942

The President of the United States of America takes pride in presenting the Navy Cross (Posthumously) to Lieutenant Commander John Charles Waldron, United States Navy, for extraordinary heroism in operations against the enemy while serving as Pilot of a carrier-based Navy Torpedo Plane and Commanding Officer of Torpedo Squadron EIGHT (VT-8), attached to the USS Hornet (CV-8), during the "Air Battle of Midway," against enemy Japanese forces on 4 June 1942. Grimly aware of the hazardous consequences of flying without fighter protection, and with insufficient fuel to return to his carrier, Lieutenant Commander Waldron resolutely, and with no thought of his own life, led his squadron in an effective torpedo attack against violent assaults of enemy Japanese aircraft fire. His courageous action, carried out with a gallant spirit of self-sacrifice and a conscientious devotion to the fulfillment of his mission, was a determining factor in the defeat of the enemy forces and was in keeping with the highest traditions of the United States Naval Service. He gallantly gave his life for his country.

=== Namesake ===
The USS Waldron (DD-699), an Allen M. Sumner-class destroyer, was named in his honor.

Naval Auxiliary Air Station Waldron Field, part of the NAS Corpus Christi, Texas complex, was named in his honor. Closed in the 1950s, NAAS Waldron Field was later reactivated in the early 1960s as an outlying field renamed OLF Waldron Field in support of student naval aviator primary flight training operations at NAS Corpus Christi, a role it continues to perform today.

Camp Waldron of the Farragut Naval Training Station on Lake Pend Oreille in northern Idaho was named in honor of LtCdr Waldron. The camp, designed to house and train 5,000 naval recruits at a time, opened on 8 November 1942.

The very popular "Waldron Deck" parking structure, named in the lieutenant commander's honor, set just south of Soldier Field in Chicago, is the premier location for Bears fans to gather for tailgating on game day. The John C. Waldron Bridge (renamed in his honor in 2002) spanned the Missouri River between Pierre and Fort Pierre, South Dakota until being demolished in March 2025.

== Ancestry ==
Ancestors of John C. Waldron

16. Col. John Waldron
8. Jeremiah Waldron
17. Joanna Shepherd
4. George Prentiss Waldron
18.
9. Mary Scott
19.
2. Charles Westbrook Waldron
20.
10. Elijah Jones
21.
5. Lydia E. Jones
22.
11. Alary Roberts
23.
1. John C. Waldron
24.
12.
25.
6.
26.
13.
27.
3. Jane Van Metre
28.
14.
29.
7.
30.
15.
31.
