= Kiichi Hasegawa =

Imperial Japanede Navy admiral (1894–1944)

- 長谷川 喜一
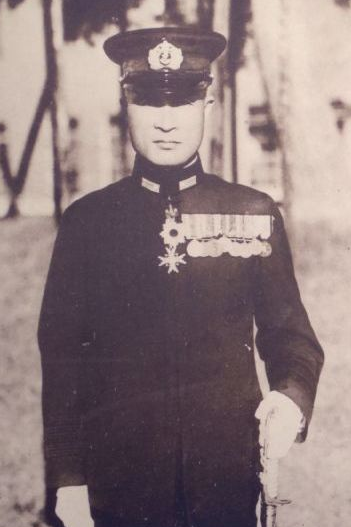
- Born: April 15, 1894; Saitama Prefecture, Japan
- Died: 29 March 1944 (aged 49)
- Military career
- Allegiance: Empire of Japan
- Branch: Imperial Japanese Navy
- Service years: 1914–1944
- Rank: Vice Admiral (posthumous)
- Commands: Aircraft carrier Ryūjō, Akagi, 21st Air Group, 12th Air Group, Kure Naval Air Group, Tsuchiura Naval Air Group, 50th Carrier Division, 22nd Air Flotilla
- Conflicts: World War II; Attack on Pearl Harbor; Invasion of Rabaul; Attack on Darwin; Dutch East Indies campaign; Indian Ocean raid

Kiichi Hasegawa (長谷川 喜一, Hasegawa Kiichi; 15 April 1894 – 29 March 1944) was an admiral in the Imperial Japanese Navy during World War II.

== Biography ==
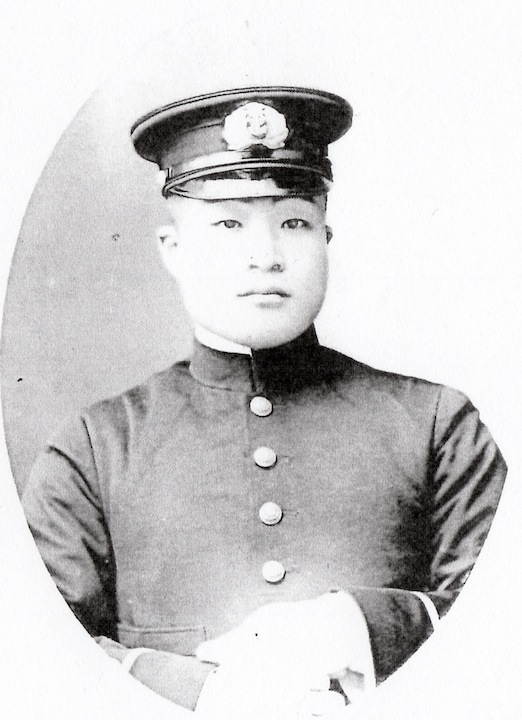
Hasegawa as an officer cadet

Hasegawa was born in Saitama prefecture. He graduated from the 42nd class of the Imperial Japanese Navy Academy in 1914, ranked 27th out of 117 cadets. As a midshipman, he served on the cruisers Soya and Tokiwa, and the battlecruiser Ibuki. After his promotion to ensign, he was assigned to the cruiser Nisshin.

After attending torpedo school and naval artillery school, he was promoted to sub-lieutenant and served on the battleship Hiei, cruiser Tsushima and destroyer Ninohi. Hasegawa was promoted to lieutenant in 1920, and attended advanced studies in torpedo warfare from 1920–1921, after which he was assigned to the cruiser Tenryū.

From 1922–1923, he attended pilot training at Yokosuka and was assigned to a naval fighter squadron based at Kasumigaura. From 1924–1925, he was assigned to the seaplane carrier Wakamiya. Serving a number of staff assignments at the Yokosuka Naval District and Naval Air Command from 1925–1932, he was promoted to lieutenant commander in 1926 and to commander in 1931. In 1933, he was sent as a naval attaché to the United States and Europe. On his return, he became the executive officer on the aircraft carrier Ryūjō. Promoted to captain in 1936, he was subsequently assigned command of a number of fighter squadrons until given command of Ryūjō in 1939.

On 25 March 1941, he took command of the aircraft carrier Akagi, which became flagship for Admiral Chuichi Nagumo during the attack on Pearl Harbor. While on Akagi, Hasegawa participated in the invasion of Rabaul in January 1942, the air strikes against Darwin, Australia in February, the invasion of Java in the Dutch East Indies in March, and the Indian Ocean raid in April. Just prior to the sortie of Akagi and Kido Butai for the Battle of Midway, he yielded his command to Captain Taijiro Aoki. Hasegawa was promoted to rear admiral on 1 November 1942.

After participating in many carrier battles in the Pacific War Hasegawa was killed in action on 29 March 1944. He was posthumously promoted to the rank of vice admiral.
