= Richard Halsey Best =

United States Naval Aviator

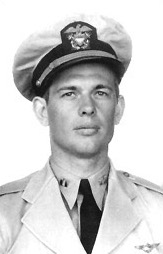
- Born: March 24, 1910; Bayonne, New Jersey, US
- Died: October 28, 2001 (aged 91); Santa Monica, California, US
- Burial place: Arlington National Cemetery
- Military career
- Allegiance: United States
- Branch: United States Navy
- Service years: 1932–1944
- Rank: Lieutenant commander
- Nickname: Dick
- Conflicts: World War II: Pacific War; Battle of Midway
- Awards: Navy Cross; Distinguished Flying Cross

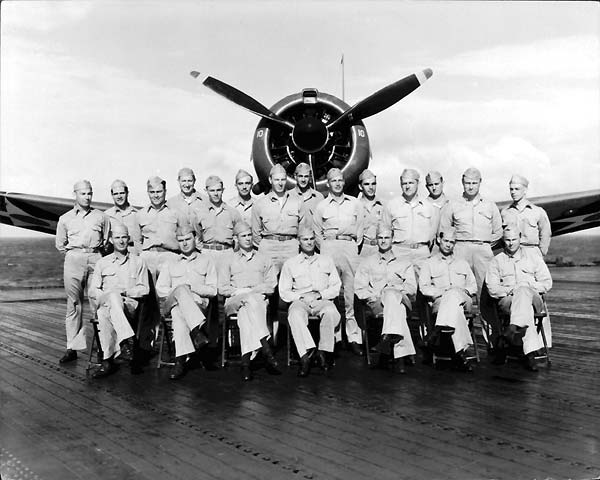
VB-6 pilots in January 1942: Best is seated 3rd from the left.

Richard Halsey Best (March 24, 1910 – October 28, 2001) was a dive bomber pilot and squadron commander in the United States Navy during World War II. Stationed on the aircraft carrier USS Enterprise, Best led his dive bomber squadron at the 1942 Battle of Midway, sinking two Japanese aircraft carriers in one day. His lungs were damaged by caustic soda fumes during the fight, leading to his medical retirement several months later.

== Early life ==
His grandfather Edward Best emigrated to the United States from England in the 1800s, living first in Wisconsin where he mustered into "F" Company of the 13th Wisconsin Infantry during the American Civil War, and later moving to California and then Oregon in his old age. Edward's son Burt Best, born in California in 1878, would later be the father of Richard H. Best. Richard H. Best was born in New Jersey in 1910. Richard married Doris Avis Albro (November 21, 1914 – December 6, 1968) on June 24, 1932, in Washington, D.C., and they divorced on January 24, 1966.

== Early career (1928–1941) ==
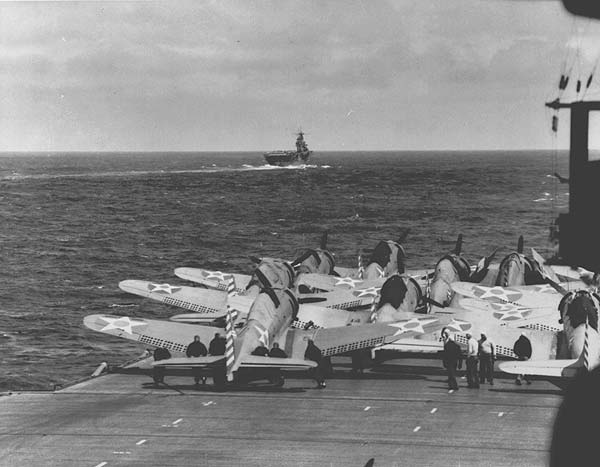
SBD-2s on Enterprise, April, 1942, Hornet in the background

Richard H. Best was appointed to the United States Naval Academy (USNA) in 1928, graduating with honors in 1932. His classmates included Bruce McCandless, Henry Munson, Lloyd Mustin, and William Raborn. He served for two years aboard the light cruiser USS Richmond. In 1934 he was transferred to the Naval Air Station Pensacola, Florida, as a naval aviation student. He completed his flight training in December 1935. His first assignment was Fighting Squadron Two (VF-2B) aboard the aircraft carrier USS Lexington, flying the Grumman F2F.

In June 1938, Best was given the choice to either join a patrol squadron at Panama or Hawaii, or become a flight instructor at Pensacola; he chose Pensacola, and was assigned to instruct Training Squadron Five. Anticipating what was probably coming, after a year and some months of instructing, Best decided that he could be of most use as a dive bomber pilot. He put in a request for a transfer to the Pacific Fleet in that capacity.

On May 31, 1940, Best received orders to join Bombing Squadron Six (VB-6), which was assigned to the aircraft carrier USS Enterprise. Upon arrival at the squadron's base on land, Naval Air Station North Island, California, on June 10, Best was made flight officer (operations officer) of the squadron, the third-in-command. By early 1942, after the war in the Pacific had begun, he had advanced to executive officer (XO), a standard navy term for second-in-command, under his close friend and USNA classmate, William Hollingsworth, known as "Holly," as commander. Best subsequently became squadron commander in time for the Battle of Midway.

== War in the Pacific (1941–1944) ==
On December 7, 1941, Best was aboard Enterprise awaiting her return to port when he learned (along with most of VB-6) that several of his squadmates on morning search had flown into the Japanese attack on Pearl Harbor. That evening, he flew in the first Enterprise strike of the war as one of six SBDs carrying smoke generators. His group was tasked with providing cover for Lieutenant Eugene E. Lindsey's torpedo bombers should they find the Japanese carriers. However, the strike found nothing, and Best's group returned to Enterprise without incident, although he later called the resulting night landing "the worst...of [his] 330 carrier landings."

Best saw his first real combat on February 1, 1942, flying in two strikes against the Marshall Islands. At dawn, he led VB-6's second division as part of a full-scale strike against Japanese shipping off Kwajalein. Before noon, he led eight SBDs from VB-6 and one from VS-6 to attack Taroa Island, Maloelap Atoll, a mission that would cost him one plane. On February 24, 1942, Best took part in the attack of Wake Island by the Enterprise Air Group, and on March 4 Marcus Island was attacked. After these raids Enterprise returned to Pearl Harbor and accompanied USS Hornet during the Doolittle Raid in mid-April. Both carriers then sped to the south, but were too late to take part in the Battle of the Coral Sea. Both carriers and their sister ship USS Yorktown were then recalled to participate in what was to be the Battle of Midway.

=== Battle of Midway ===
After contact reports from Midway-based PBY Catalina patrol aircraft on the morning of June 4, 1942, Enterprise started to launch her air group at 7:06 a.m. Air group commander Lt. Cdr. Wade McClusky led a force of 14 TBD-1 Devastator torpedo bombers of Torpedo Squadron 6 (VT-6), 34 SBDs of VB-6 and VS-6, and ten F4F-4 Wildcat fighters of Fighting Squadron 6 (VF-6). The squadrons became separated and reached the Japanese independently. Only the dive bombers stayed together; they reached the Japanese by 9:55. About 10:22, the Enterprise dive bombers (minus three that had dropped out with engine trouble) started to attack the two nearest Japanese carriers, Kaga and Akagi.

==== Sinking of Akagi ====
The attack became confused. All 31 remaining Dauntlesses moved to attack Kaga. Best expected to attack according to U.S. dive bomber doctrine, which stated that the trailing squadron (VB-6) would attack the nearer target (in this case Kaga), while the leading squadron (VS-6) would take the farther of the two (here Akagi). Best made a last-second decision to attack the Akagi after noticing that the other planes were focused on Kaga.

Within minutes, three of the four Japanese carriers had been turned into burning hulks.

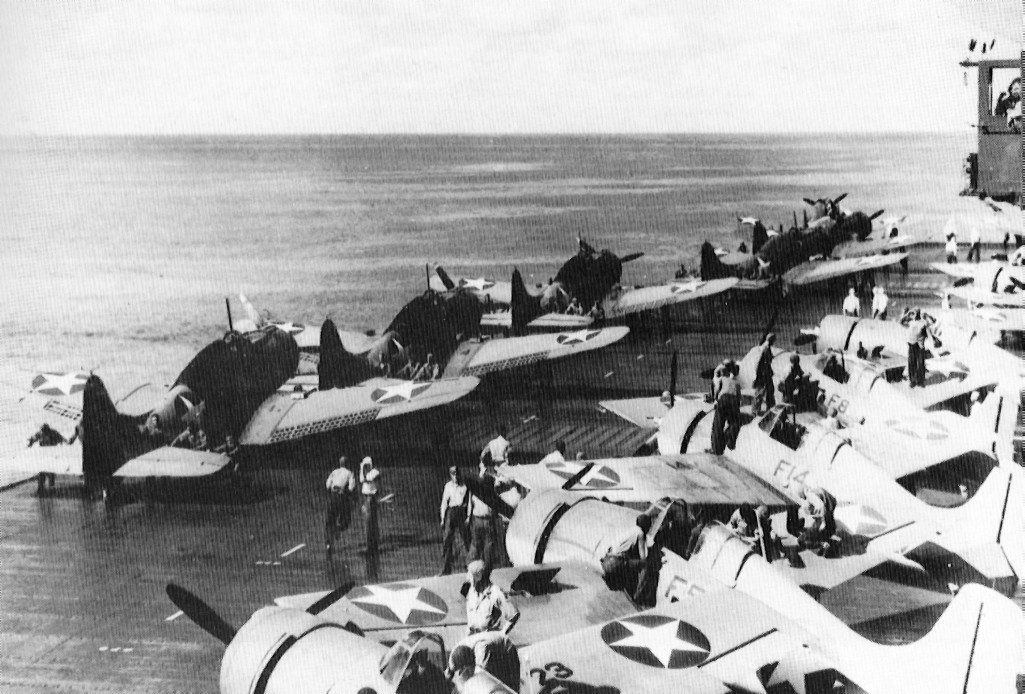
The flight deck of USS Enterprise on May 15, 1942: The first SBD is either Best's ("B-1") or that of the CO of VS-6 ("S-1").

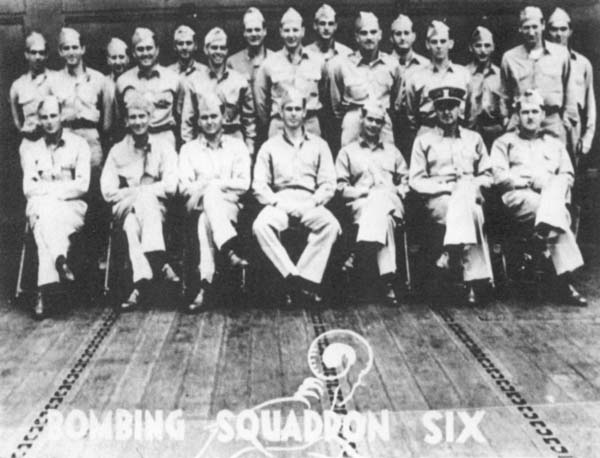
A group photo of the American dive bomber pilots of VB-6 from Enterprise, three of whom fatally damaged Akagi. Best is sitting in the center of the front row. The other two who attacked Akagi with Best were Edwin J. Kroeger (standing, eighth from the left) and Frederick T. Weber (standing, sixth from the right).

Best's three SBDs launched their attack at 10:26 a.m. The first bomb, likely dropped by Lieutenant(jg) Edwin John Kroeger, hit the water opposite the Akagi's bridge. The second bomb, likely dropped by Best, penetrated the flight deck and exploded in the upper hangar amonga B5N2 aircraft. The third bomb, likely dropped by Ensign Frederick Thomas Weber, exploded in the water near the stern, jamming Akagi's rudder. Although only Best's bomb struck Akagi, secondary fuel- and ordnance-induced explosions in the confined hangar deck were enough to doom the carrier.

==== Sinking of Hiryū ====
Later that day, Best participated in the attack on the last remaining Japanese carrier, Hiryū, possibly scoring one of the four hits that sank her. Best's gunner, James Francis Murray, believed that he "saw the flash of [Best's] bomb through the smoke as it struck [Hiryū] amidships forward of the island." After the battle, Best was awarded the Navy Cross and the Distinguished Flying Cross. The citation said "Defying extreme danger from concentrated anti-aircraft barrage and powerful fighter opposition, Lieutenant Commander Best, with bold determination and courageous zeal, led his squadron in dive-bombing assaults against Japanese naval units. Flying at a distance from his own forces which rendered return unlikely because of probable fuel exhaustion, he pressed home his attacks with extreme disregard for his own personal safety. His gallant intrepidity and loyal devotion to duty contributed greatly to the success of our forces and were in keeping with the highest traditions of the United States Naval Service". According to Stephen L. Moore, Best may have been "the first pilot to successfully bomb two Japanese carriers in one day". Considering this unique accomplishment, Admiral Thomas Moorer and Vice Admiral William D. Houser made a serious but unsuccessful effort to recommend Best for the Medal of Honor after Best's death in 2001.

=== Medical retirement ===
Best never flew for the U.S. Navy again. Just after he landed on Enterprise, he began to cough up blood. Over the next 24 hours, his hemoptysis (coughing up blood) continued. He became acutely ill with a temperature of 103 °F (39 °C). Ultimately, he was admitted to Pearl Harbor Hospital, where he was examined by the flight surgeon.

During the morning flight on June 4 flying at 20,000 ft (6,100 m), several VB-6 pilots had encountered difficulties with the oxygen supply, so Best gave the order to reduce the altitude to 15,000 ft (4,600 m). The oxygen rebreather of Best's SBD had become heated during the unusually long search on the morning mission on June 4. The material used in the rebreather to remove exhaled carbon dioxide was sodium hydroxide. If the device containing this material were abnormally heated, it could release caustic soda fumes through the pilot's oxygen mask; consequently, Best had inhaled caustic fumes. Sometime in the past, Best had contracted latent tuberculosis, which remained in his lungs in an inactive state for years. The inhaled caustic fumes caused a chemical pneumonitis and eroded away a tuberculosis granuloma, transforming the inactive form of the organism into an active form, resulting in the progression from latent TB infection to TB disease.

Best was transferred from Pearl Harbor Hospital to Fitzsimons General Hospital in Aurora, Colorado, where he received proper treatment for his tuberculosis. Best was hospitalized in Fitzsimons Hospital until September 1943. He retired from the U.S. Navy in 1944 with a 100% disability.

== Civilian life (1944–2001) ==
External videos
- Richard Best's interview about his recollections of the Battle of Midway, YouTube

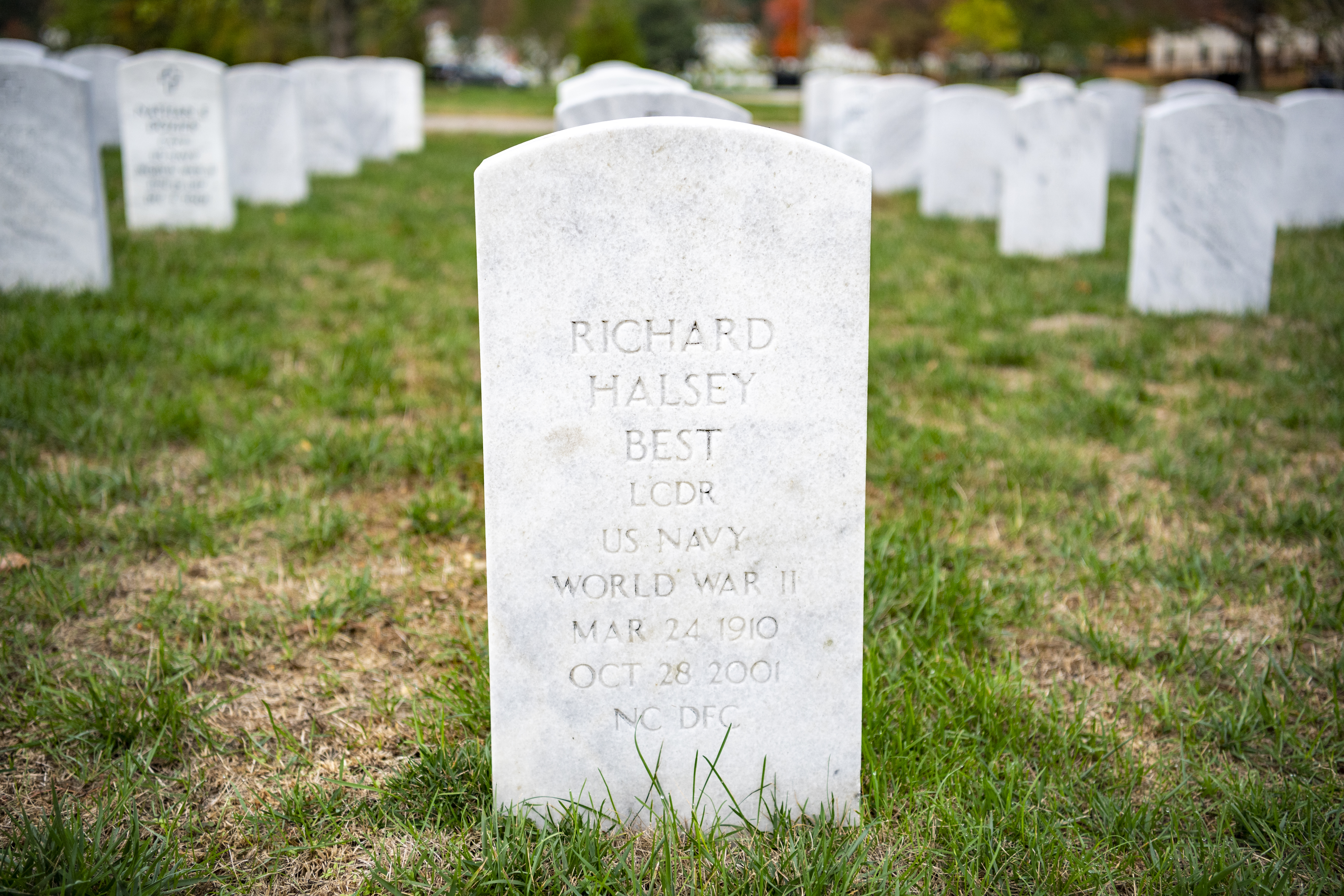
Grave at Arlington National Cemetery

After his retirement from the Navy, Best moved to Santa Monica, California, where he lived for the rest of his life. After discharge from the hospital, Best worked in a small research division of the Douglas Aircraft Corporation. This division became part of the Rand Corporation in December 1948, where Best headed the security department until his retirement in March 1975. Best wrote the preface to the manual of Battlehawks 1942, a flight simulation video game released in 1988 by LucasFilm Games.

He died on October 28, 2001, at the age of 91, and was buried at Arlington National Cemetery.

Best was married to Doris Avis (Albrio) (1914–1968) and had a daughter, a son, a grandson, and a step-daughter.

== Portrayals in film ==
Best and Joseph Rochefort served as consultants on the 1976 film Midway alongside George Gay, the only survivor of Torpedo Squadron 8. Best also serves as one of the protagonists of the 2019 film Midway, portrayed by Ed Skrein.

== Awards and honors ==
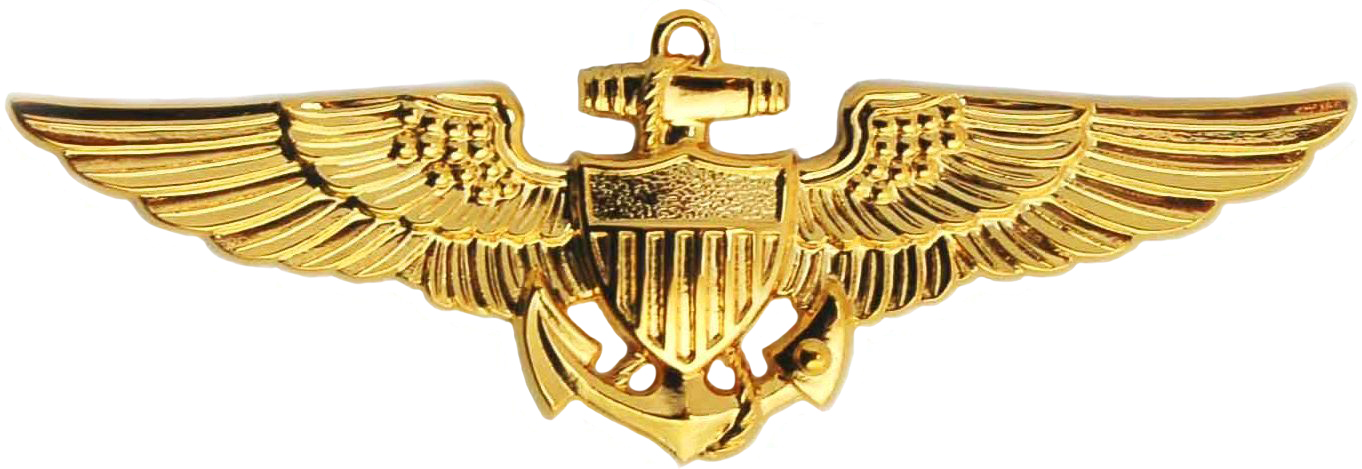

Naval Aviator Badge
Navy Cross	Distinguished Flying Cross	Combat Action Ribbon
Navy Presidential Unit Citation	American Defense Service Medal w/ Fleet clasp	American Campaign Medal
Asiatic-Pacific Campaign Medal w/ three 3/16" bronze stars	World War II Victory Medal	Navy Distinguished Marksman Ribbon

=== Navy Cross citation ===

Lieutenant Commander Richard Halsey Best
U.S. Navy
Date Of Action: June 4, 1942 to June 6, 1942

The President of the United States of America takes pleasure in presenting the Navy Cross to Lieutenant Commander Richard Halsey Best (NSN: 0-71601), United States Navy, for extraordinary heroism in operations against the enemy while serving as Pilot of a carrier-based Navy Dive Bomber and Squadron Commander in Bombing Squadron SIX (VB-6), attached to the USS. Enterprise (CV-6), during the "Air Battle of Midway," against enemy Japanese forces on 4–6 June 1942. Defying extreme danger from concentrated anti-aircraft barrage and powerful fighter opposition, Lieutenant Commander Best, with bold determination and courageous zeal, led his squadron in dive-bombing assaults against Japanese naval units. Flying at a distance from his own forces which rendered return unlikely because of probable fuel exhaustion, he pressed home his attacks with extreme disregard for his own personal safety. His gallant intrepidity and loyal devotion to duty contributed greatly to the success of our forces and were in keeping with the highest traditions of the United States Naval Service.

== Bibliography ==
- Cressman, Robert J., and Wenger, J. Michael, Steady Nerves and Stout Hearts: The Enterprise (CV-6) Air Group and Pearl Harbor, 7 December 1941. Pictorial Histories Publishing Co., Missoula 1990. ISBN 0929521250
- Moore, Stephen L. (2014). Pacific Payback: The Carrier Aviators Who Avenged Pearl Harbor at the Battle of Midway. New York: Penguin Group.
