= USS Weber =

Buckley-class destroyer escort

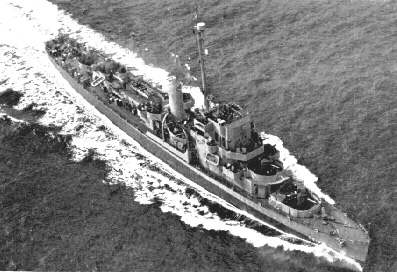
- USS Weber, September 1943, before conversion to a high speed transport (APD-75).

History

United States
- Laid down: 22 February 1943
- Launched: 1 May 1943
- Commissioned: 30 June 1943
- Reclassified: 15 December 1944, to APD-75
- Decommissioned: January 1947
- Stricken: 1 June 1960
- Fate: Sunk as a target, 15 July 1962

General characteristics
- Displacement: 1,740 tons full; 1,400 tons, standard
- Length: 306 ft 0 in (93.27 m)
- Beam: 36 ft 9 in (11.20 m)
- Draft: 13 ft 6 in (4.11 m)
- Propulsion: GE turbo-electric drive, 12,000 shp (8.9 MW); two propellers
- Speed: 24 knots (44 km/h)
- Range: 4,940 nautical miles (9,150 km) at 12 knots (22 km/h)
- Complement: 15 officers, 198 men
- Armament: (as DE-675); 3 × 3 in (76 mm) DP guns, 3 × 21 in (53 cm) torpedo tubes, 1 × 1.1 in (28 mm) quad AA gun, 8 × 20 mm cannon, 1 × hedgehog projector, 2 × depth charge tracks, 8 × K-gun depth charge projectors

USS Weber (DE-675/APD-75) was a Buckley-class destroyer escort of the United States Navy, named in honor of Ensign Frederick T. Weber (1916–1942), a naval aviator who was posthumously awarded the Navy Cross for heroism during the Battle of Midway.

Weber was laid down on 22 February 1943 at Quincy, Massachusetts, by the Bethlehem Shipbuilding Company's Fore River Shipyard; launched on 1 May 1943; sponsored by Mrs. Matt A. Walsh; and commissioned on 30 June 1943.

== World War II ==
The destroyer escort completed fitting out and then departed Provincetown, Massachusetts, on 23 July for Bermuda. At the conclusion of shakedown training in waters surrounding those islands, she returned north and arrived in Boston, Massachusetts, on 21 August. Following post-shakedown availability, the new warship left Boston for several days of additional training—in antisubmarine warfare (ASW) tactics – out of New London, Connecticut. Upon completing that assignment, Weber entered New York Harbor to prepare for her first combat duty.

=== Atlantic service as DE-675 ===
On 5 September, the warship stood out of New York in the screen of a transatlantic convoy. Following a relatively uneventful voyage, she and her charges entered port at Derry, Northern Ireland, on the 16th. There, she remained until the 21st, when she headed back across the Atlantic with a return convoy. She ended that voyage at St. John's, Newfoundland and Labrador, on 1 October but, soon thereafter, moved to New York for a 10-day availability at the Brooklyn Navy Yard.

In mid-October, Weber escorted a convoy from New York to the Dutch island of Curaçao, off the coast of Venezuela. She arrived in Willemstad on 24 October and remained there five days awaiting the formation of a transatlantic convoy. This group of Allied ships departed Curaçao on 29 October and set a course for the British Isles and arrived in Derry on Armistice Day 1943.

At that point, Weber settled into a routine of escorting convoys between Derry and New York which lasted until August 1944. By that time, she had made six more round-trip voyages between those ports. On many occasions during the period, she and her consorts in the screen made sonar and radar contacts on unidentified ships. While on such occasions they frequently attacked the strangers with depth charges, Weber and her sister escorts directed their greatest efforts to diverting their transports and cargo ships from the paths of U-boats. When doing so, they informed nearby hunter-killer groups of the location of the contacts and delegated to them primary responsibility for offensive antisubmarine warfare. As a result, confirmed U-boat kills eluded Weber; but she and the other escorts in the screens accomplished their primary mission of shepherding the convoys safely across the ocean.

On 7 August, she departed Derry for the last time. Her convoy arrived safely in New York on the 20th and, after voyage repairs, the warship began preparations to embark upon a new but brief phase in her wartime career. After the Allied forces which invaded Europe in June established control over the coast of France, convoys no longer needed to travel the long northern route around Ireland to avoid enemy aircraft and submarines based on that coast. Instead, they now could use the shorter and more economical route around the southern coast of England directly to the French channel ports, primary among which was Cherbourg. In September, Weber made one round-trip voyage to Cherbourg; then returned to the United States via that route and arrived back at New York near the end of the month.

After a 10-day availability and four days of exercises, the ship proceeded to Norfolk, Virginia to join a convoy bound for North Africa and the Mediterranean Sea. She departed Norfolk with the convoy on 21 October. En route to Gibraltar, she rescued the crew of a Portuguese fishing vessel damaged badly in a collision with Weber during an investigation of the then-unidentified vessel. Soon after the rescue, the Portuguese vessel sank. After landing the fishermen at Gibraltar, Weber continued on to Bizerte, Tunisia, where she stopped on 12 November, and thence proceeded to Palermo, Sicily, for repairs to damage sustained in the collision with the Portuguese trawler. She rejoined her escort group at Oran, Algeria, and embarked upon the return voyage on 23 November. Weber escorted one section of the attached convoy into Philadelphia, Pennsylvania on 10 December.

=== Pacific service as APD-75 ===
Five days after her arrival in Philadelphia, Weber was redesignated a high-speed transport and received a new hull number, APD-75. Conversion work on her began immediately. During the following three months, she exchanged her 3-inch battery for a new 5-inch, dual-purpose gun which had proven highly effective both for antiaircraft defense and for bombardment work. In addition, her relatively weak antiaircraft battery was beefed up substantially. Her spaces were modified to provide a place for underwater demolition teams (UDT) and their equipment. Her conversion indicated an impending reassignment to the Pacific theater where the UDT men played an important role in the initial stages of amphibious operations. She completed her conversion in mid-March 1945.

During the latter part of the month, she moved to Norfolk where she practiced shore bombardments and antiaircraft defense. On 14 April, she departed Norfolk. Arriving at Panama on the 19th, she transited the Panama Canal the following day and reported for duty with the Pacific Fleet. Continuing her voyage, the warship stopped briefly at San Diego, California and then headed for the Hawaiian Islands. She arrived in Pearl Harbor on 8 May and underwent a brief period of voyage repairs. During the middle part of May, she conducted reconnaissance and demolition exercises at Kahoolawe, Maui, with members of UDT 23. After a short series of refresher training and antisubmarine warfare exercises, she departed Oahu on the 24th for the western Pacific. She entered the lagoon at Eniwetok on 1 June, remained for a day due to a fueling delay, and then continued on to Ulithi where she arrived on 6 June.

On 13 June, Weber departed Ulithi to escort California to Okinawa where the battleship was needed to render gunfire support to American forces subduing the defenders on the southern portion of the island. The task unit arrived off the island four days later. Following a short time at Hagushi anchorage, Weber put into the roadstead at Kerama Retto for fuel. On 25 June, she was assigned to a surface force built around battleships California and West Virginia, and cruisers Wichita, Tuscaloosa, San Francisco, St. Louis, and Chester. Serving as antisubmarine and mine escort for that unit, she patrolled the waters around Okinawa until 1 July, protecting communications and supply lines. She returned to Hagushi for a week on 1 July and departed the Ryūkyūs on the 8th in the screen of a convoy bound for the Marianas. Delivering her charges safely at Saipan on 12 July, she continued her voyage the following day and arrived at San Pedro Bay, Leyte, on the 17th. She spent the remaining weeks of World War II at Leyte engaged in training exercises in preparation for the expected invasion of the Japanese home islands. Fortunately, the Japanese agreed to surrender terms on 15 August, making that operation unnecessary.

== Post-war service ==
Soon after the cessation of hostilities, Weber returned to Okinawa to prepare for the occupation of Japanese territory. She arrived back in the Ryukyus on 21 August and reported for duty with Task Force 95 (TF 95). She trained briefly with that task organization at Okinawa until 7 September when she reported for duty with TF 55. On 10 September, she departed the Ryukyus with Task Unit 55.7.1 (TU 55.7.1) bound for Japan. She and her colleagues arrived at Nagasaki the following day and began two weeks of service evacuating and caring for former Allied prisoners of war held in Japan. She completed that assignment on 23 September and returned to Okinawa on the 25th. On 7 October, the warship put to sea once more, this time bound for Qingdao and Taku in northern China with a convoy carrying marines for duty ashore there. Typhoon Louise – a severe storm which devastated Allied forces at Okinawa – scattered the little flotilla and damaged some of the ships, forcing Weber to return to Okinawa as an escort for the more severely damaged ones. She rejoined the remainder of the convoy just before mid-month and escorted a portion of it into Taku on 16 October. The next day, she got underway for the Philippines with two American merchant ships which she saw safely to Okinawa before breaking off and continuing on to Luzon. The ship arrived in Manila on 23 October and, after discharging about 100 passengers, headed back to China. During the month of November, she shuttled Nationalist Chinese troops from Hong Kong to strife-torn northern China.

She concluded that duty at Qingdao on 25 November and sailed for the East Coast of the United States that same day. Steaming via Okinawa, Guam, and Eniwetok, she arrived in Pearl Harbor on 13 December. On the 16th, she resumed her voyage home and arrived in San Diego on the 22d. Following a week's layover, she left San Diego and set course for the Panama Canal. The warship transited the canal between 7 and 9 January 1946 and headed for New York on the latter date. She entered the New York Naval Shipyard on 15 January, discharged passengers, and began her preinactivation overhaul. On 18 February, she departed New York and, after a two-day stop at Norfolk, Virginia, arrived in Green Cove Springs, Florida, on the 23d. There, she reported to the Atlantic Reserve Fleet for layup. Placed out of commission by directive in January 1947, Weber remained inactive for more than 15 years. Her name was struck from the Navy List on 1 June 1960; and, a little over two years later, she was sunk as a target on 15 July 1962, by AGM-12 "Bullpup" air-to-surface (ASM) missiles.

Weber earned one battle star during World War II.
