= Frederick T. Weber =

United States Navy aviator (1916–1942)

Frederick Thomas Weber
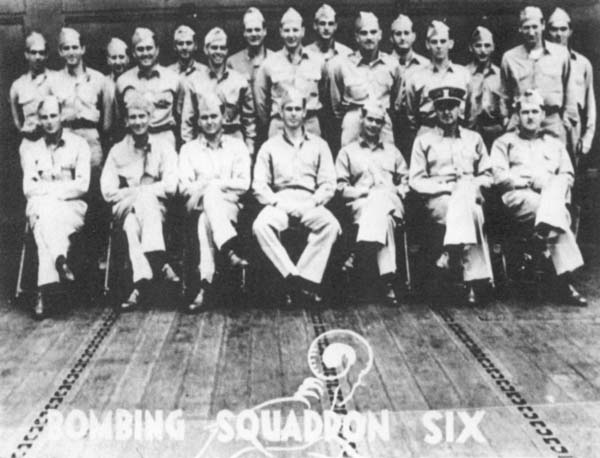
- Lt. j.g. Weber is standing, 6th from the right.
- Born: February 4, 1916; Des Moines, Iowa
- Died: June 4, 1942 (aged 26) vicinity of Midway Atoll
- Military career
- Allegiance: United States of America
- Branch: United States Naval Reserve
- Service years: 1938–42
- Rank: Lieutenant (j.g.)
- Unit: Bombing Squadron 6 (VB-6)
- Conflicts: World War II; *Battle of Midway
- Awards: Navy Cross; Purple Heart

Frederick Thomas Weber (4 February 1916 – 4 June 1942) was a naval aviator in the United States Navy during World War II.

== Early life ==
Weber was born on 4 February 1916 at Des Moines, Iowa. He attended college at Knox College in Galesburg, Illinois, in 1933 and 1934 before transferring to Drake University in Des Moines in 1935. He graduated from the latter school during the summer of 1938 and enlisted in the United States Naval Reserve on 30 August of that year.

== Military career ==
During the ensuing winter, Seaman 2d Class Weber successfully completed elimination flight training at the Naval Reserve Aviation Base, Kansas City, Kansas; and, on 27 July 1939, he was appointed an aviation cadet in the Naval Reserve. After 10 months of training at the Naval Air Station, Pensacola, Fla., Weber was appointed a naval aviator on 10 May 1940. A little over a month later, he concluded his training and, on 12 June 1940, received his commission as an ensign in the Naval Reserve. That same day, he received orders to report for duty with Bombing Squadron 6 (VB-6) attached to the aircraft carrier Enterprise (CV-6).

Enterprise and VB-6 proved to be Ens. Weber's only assignment during his brief naval career. During the remainder of 1940 and for 11 of the 12 months of 1941, he served with his ship and squadron operating out of San Diego, Calif., and later out of Pearl Harbor. His duties consisted entirely of training in aerial warfare in preparation for the conflict with Japan expected to erupt at any time.

=== World War II ===
At the end of the first week in December 1941, he was at sea with Enterprise which was returning from Wake Island where she had just delivered Marine Fighting Squadron 211 (VMF-211). On the morning of 7 December, Weber was paired with Ensign Manuel Gonzalez as part of the scheduled morning search flight into Pearl Harbor. The two SBDs encountered Aichi D3A dive bombers from the Japanese attack, and Weber was separated from Gonzalez, who was shot down. After evading the Japanese, he joined the surviving Enterprise searchers at Ford Island, and later took off again as part of an unsuccessful attempt to find the Japanese carriers. On 8 December, Enterprise arrived at Pearl and Weber rejoined his ship.

In January 1942, Weber's ship guarded reinforcement convoys on their way to the southern Pacific. In February, he participated in the carrier raids on Japanese-held islands in the Central Pacific. In April, his ship served as an escort for Hornet (CV-8) during the Halsey–Doolittle bomber raid on Tokyo and returned to Oahu on 25 April. Dispatched too late to join in the Battle of the Coral Sea, his ship returned to Pearl Harbor on 26 May to prepare for what would be an even more important strategic battle — the first real defeat of Japanese naval airpower during the struggle over Midway Island.

==== The Battle of Midway ====
On 28 May, Enterprise steamed out of Pearl Harbor, accompanied by Hornet and the cruisers and destroyers of Task Force 16 (TF 16), to lie in ambush north of Midway. Partially repaired, Yorktown (CV-5) followed two days later. On the morning of 4 June, land-based patrol planes from Midway made contact with the advancing Japanese force spearheaded by four of the six carriers that had attacked Pearl Harbor. While Midway defended itself against enemy air attacks and land-based air unsuccessfully tried to pierce the Japanese defenses, Weber and his comrades in VB-6 took to the air to begin a long grueling search. By 07:30, the entire attack group was aloft and streaking off toward the enemy's reported position. Lieutenant Commander Clarence Wade McClusky, the Enterprise air group commander (CAG), led the squadron himself as the formation winged on toward Vice Admiral Chuichi Nagumo's Carrier Striking Force.

At 09:20, the squadron arrived at the supposed location of the enemy. Gazing down, the aircrewman strained for a glimpse of the threatening carriers but saw only empty seas. At that juncture, the air group commander made a hard decision. His planes had already consumed a great deal of fuel; and, were they to initiate a search, some would surely fail to return as a result. On the other hand, if they returned for fuel, Midway might fall or, even worse, the enemy might find and sink or severely damage one or more of the U.S. Pacific Fleet's three remaining carriers. Therefore, the importance of stopping Nagumo's carriers at almost any cost dictated the course of action. The American pilots ignored their fuel gauges and started hunting for the Japanese.

At 10:05, Weber and his colleagues were rewarded for their perseverance and determination. On the horizon to the northwest loomed a task force composed of three large carriers and numerous escorts. Initially, some Americans believed that they had inadvertently circled back to their ships, but "pagoda" masts and yellow flight decks of the carriers below quickly dispelled that fear.

The original plan of squadron leader Lt. Dick Best had been to attack the closest target, later identified as the Kaga. However, just as he was pushing over, Best saw several grey streaks pass in front of him. Realizing, to his frustration, that Wade McClusky, along with VS-6, was taking his target, he pulled out and attempted to lead VB-6 to the next visible target, the Akagi. Unfortunately, the majority of the squadron, either missing his signal or seeing a lot of near-misses on Kaga, stuck with the original target. That left just three planes - his own, Lt(jg) Edwin Kroger's, and Ens. Weber's—to attack Akagi. Realizing that everything had to count, Best advised his wingmen, "Don't let this carrier escape!"

Ens. Weber, flying the No. 3 position, followed his squadron leader in on Akagi. Of the three bombs released, one—Kroeger's—splashed alongside the carrier's bridge, drenching Nagumo and his staff. Another—Weber's—struck the water near the fantail, close enough to bend the deck upwards and jam the ship's rudder. However, the bomb that counted was that dropped by Best himself. His 1,000lb bomb struck the flight deck and exploded in the upper hangar amongst fueled and armed planes, starting a conflagration that ultimately doomed the ship. The VB-6 Action Report, written on the assumption that the entire first division (5 planes) attacked the target, states that "... at least three 1,000-pound bomb hits were observed on that target and it became a mass of flame and smoke." While somewhat off the mark in terms of the actual results, Weber and his section had nonetheless ensured the destruction of the Akagi.

Pulling out of his dive, Weber formed on his leader for the flight home. Weber would prove to be one of only five VB-6 pilots who returned to Enterprise; the rest had either ditched due to fuel exhaustion, or taken refuge on Enterprise's sister-ship, USS Yorktown. After landing, Weber's leader - Best - reported that one Japanese carrier - later determined to be Hiryū - remained intact, and that a follow-up strike should be launched as soon as possible.

That afternoon, Weber took off from Enterprise with a composite attack group made up of the remnants of the several groups decimated earlier. At about 15:45, six planes from VS-6 and 14 from Yorktown's VB-3 joined with the four operational aircraft remaining to VB-6 and sped off in chase of the remaining carrier. Unfortunately, the American fighters still extant had to remain with the carriers as combat air patrol so the attack group was denuded of fighter cover.

About an hour later, the American hunters found their quarry. The American planes climbed to 19,000 feet (6,000 m) and maneuvered their way up-sun of Hiryū and her escorts. During the jockeying for position, Japanese fighters jumped the unprotected dive bombers. Before reaching the "push over" point, Ens. Weber's plane fell victim to the enemy fighters. He and his gunner, Aviation Ordnanceman 3d Class E. L. Hilbert, spiraled into the sea and to their deaths. For his part in sinking Akagi and for his supreme sacrifice in assisting his colleagues to sink the remaining enemy carrier, Ens. Weber was promoted retroactively to lieutenant (junior grade) and was awarded the Navy Cross posthumously.

== Awards and honors ==
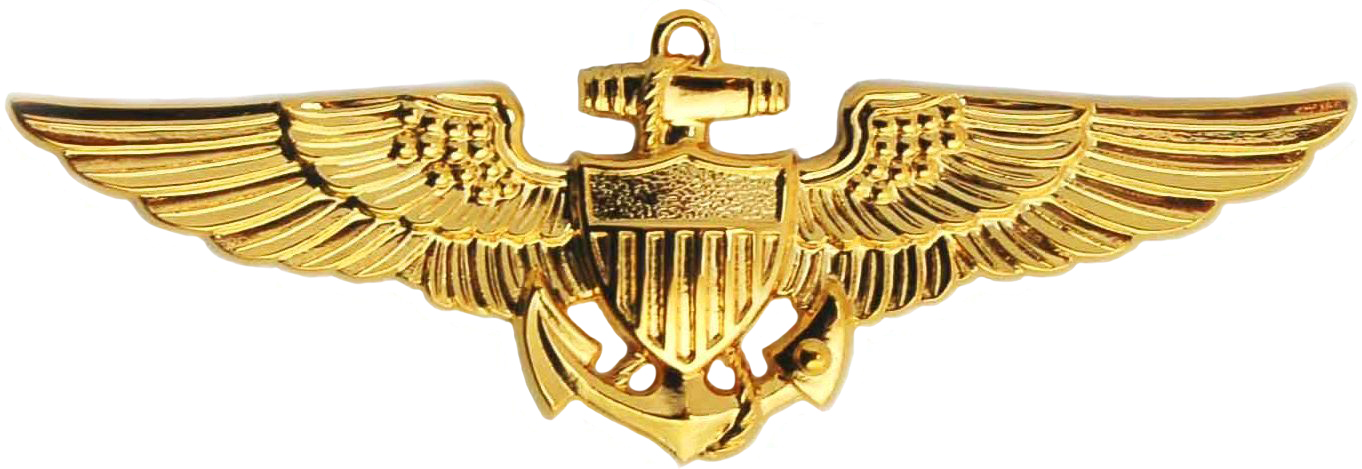

Naval Aviator Badge
Navy Cross
Purple Heart	Navy Presidential Unit Citation	American Defense Service Medal w/ Fleet Clasp (3/16" Bronze Star)
American Campaign Medal	Asiatic–Pacific Campaign Medal w/ three 3/16" bronze stars	World War II Victory Medal

=== Navy Cross citation ===

Ensign Frederick Thomas Weber
U.S. Navy
Date Of Action: June 4, 1942

The President of the United States of America takes pride in presenting the Navy Cross (Posthumously) to Ensign Frederick Thomas Weber, United States Naval Reserve, for extraordinary heroism in operations against the enemy while serving as Pilot of a carrier-based Navy Dive Bomber in Bombing Squadron SIX (VB-6), attached to the U.S.S. Enterprise (CV-6), during the "Air Battle of Midway," against enemy Japanese forces on 4–6 June 1942. Flying at a distance from his own forces which rendered return unlikely because of probable fuel exhaustion, Ensign Weber participated in two dive-bombing attacks against Japanese naval units. In the first, launched in the face of concentrated anti-aircraft fire and overwhelming fighter opposition, he scored a direct hit on an enemy aircraft carrier. In the second, while pressing home a desperate and vigorous counter-attack against Japanese fighters, he was shot down. His unflinching devotion to duty, maintained at great personal risk against tremendous odds, aided greatly in the success of our forces and was in keeping with the highest traditions of the United States Naval Service. He gallantly gave his life for his country.

=== Namesake ===
In 1943, the destroyer escort USS Weber (DE-675) was named in his honor.

== Bibliography ==
- Cressman, Robert J., and Wenger, J. Michael, Steady Nerves and Stout Hearts: The Enterprise (CV-6) Air Group and Pearl Harbor, 7 December 1941. Pictorial Histories Publishing Co., Missoula 1990. ISBN 0929521250
