= Japanese aircraft carrier Akagi =

Aircraft carrier of the Imperial Japanese Navy

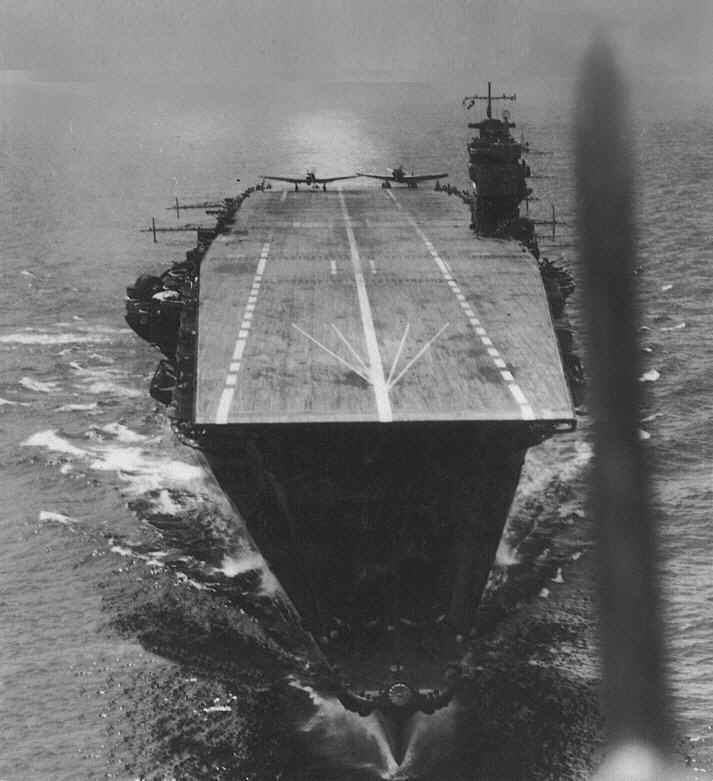
- Akagi conducting flight operations, April 1942

Class overview
- Operators: Imperial Japanese Navy
- Preceded by: Hōshō
- Succeeded by: Kaga
- Built: 1920–1927
- In service: 1927–1942
- In commission: 1927–1942
- Completed: 1
- Lost: 1

History

Empire of Japan
- Name: Akagi
- Namesake: Mount Akagi
- Ordered: 1920
- Builder: Kure Naval Arsenal
- Cost: ¥53 million ($36.45 million)
- Laid down: 6 December 1920
- Launched: 22 April 1925
- Commissioned: 25 March 1927
- Reclassified: 21 November 1923 as an aircraft carrier
- Refit: 24 October 1935 – 31 August 1938
- Stricken: 25 September 1942
- Fate: Damaged by aircraft during the Battle of Midway and scuttled, 5 June 1942

General characteristics (after 1938 modernization)
- Class & type: None
- Type: Aircraft carrier
- Displacement: 36,500 long tons (37,100 t) (standard); 41,300 long tons (42,000 t) (deep load)
- Length: 260.67 m (855 ft 3 in)
- Beam: 31.32 m (102 ft 9 in)
- Draught: 8.71 m (28 ft 7 in)
- Installed power: 19 water-tube boilers; 133,000 shp (99,000 kW)
- Propulsion: 4 shafts; 4 geared steam turbines
- Speed: 31.5 knots (58.3 km/h; 36.2 mph)
- Range: 10,000 nmi (19,000 km; 12,000 mi) at 16 knots (30 km/h; 18 mph)
- Complement: 1,630
- Armament: 6 × single 20 cm (7.9 in) guns; 6 × twin 120 mm (4.7 in) AA guns; 14 × twin 25 mm (1 in) AA guns
- Armor: Belt: 152 mm (6.0 in); Deck: 79 mm (3.1 in)
- Aircraft carried: 66 (+25 reserve); 21 Mitsubishi A6M Zero; 18 Aichi D3A; 27 Nakajima B5N (7 Dec 1941)

Service record
- Part of: First Air Fleet (Kido Butai)
- Commanders: Isoroku Yamamoto (1928–29); Ryūnosuke Kusaka (1939–40); Kiichi Hasegawa (1941–42); Taijiro Aoki (1942)
- Operations: Second Sino-Japanese War; World War II, Pacific War: Attack on Pearl Harbor; Invasion of Rabaul; Bombing of Darwin; Invasion of Java; Indian Ocean raid; Battle of Midway

Akagi (Japanese: 赤城; "Red castle", named after Mount Akagi) was an aircraft carrier built for the Imperial Japanese Navy (IJN). Though she was laid down as an Amagi-class battlecruiser, Akagi was converted to an aircraft carrier while still under construction to comply with the terms of the Washington Naval Treaty. The ship was rebuilt from 1935 to 1938 with her original three flight decks consolidated into a single enlarged flight deck and an island superstructure. The second Japanese aircraft carrier to enter service, and the first large or "fleet" carrier, Akagi and the related Kaga figured prominently in the development of the IJN's new carrier striking force doctrine that grouped carriers together, concentrating their air power. This doctrine enabled Japan to attain its strategic goals during the early stages of the Pacific War from December 1941 until mid-1942.

Akagi's aircraft served in the Second Sino-Japanese War in the late 1930s. Upon the formation of the First Air Fleet or Kido Butai (Striking Force) in early 1941, she became its flagship, and remained so for the duration of her service. With other fleet carriers, she took part in the Attack on Pearl Harbor in December 1941 and the invasion of Rabaul in the Southwest Pacific in January 1942. The following month, her aircraft bombed Darwin, Australia, and assisted in the conquest of the Dutch East Indies. In March and April 1942, Akagi's aircraft helped sink a British heavy cruiser and an Australian destroyer in the Indian Ocean Raid.

After a brief refit, Akagi and three other fleet carriers of the Kido Butai participated in the Battle of Midway in June 1942. After bombarding American forces on the atoll, Akagi and the other carriers were attacked by aircraft from Midway and the carriers Enterprise, Hornet, and Yorktown. A single dive bomber from Enterprise severely damaged Akagi. When it became obvious she could not be saved, she was scuttled by Japanese destroyers to prevent her from falling into enemy hands. The loss of Akagi and three other IJN carriers at Midway was a crucial strategic defeat for Japan and contributed significantly to the Allies' ultimate victory in the Pacific. Her wreck was located in 2019 by the research vessel Petrel.

== Design ==
=== Construction and launch ===
Akagi was laid down as an Amagi-class battlecruiser at Kure, Japan, on 6 December 1920. Construction was halted, however, when Japan signed the Washington Naval Treaty on 6 February 1922. The treaty placed restrictions on the construction of battleships and battlecruisers although it authorized the conversion of two battleship or battlecruiser hulls under construction into aircraft carriers of up to 33,000 long tons (34,000 t) displacement. The IJN had decided, following the launch of its first aircraft carrier, Hōshō, to construct two larger, faster carriers for operations with major fleet units. The incomplete hulls of Amagi and Akagi were thus selected for completion as the two large carriers under the 1924 fleet construction program. ¥24.7 million was originally budgeted to complete Akagi as a battlecruiser and an estimated ¥8 million had been expended when construction stopped in February 1922. Shortly thereafter, the Diet approved an additional ¥90 million to complete Akagi and Amagi as carriers. Her guns were turned over to the Imperial Japanese Army for use as coastal artillery; one of her main-gun turrets was installed on Iki Island in the Strait of Tsushima in 1932. The rest of her guns were placed in reserve and scrapped in 1943.

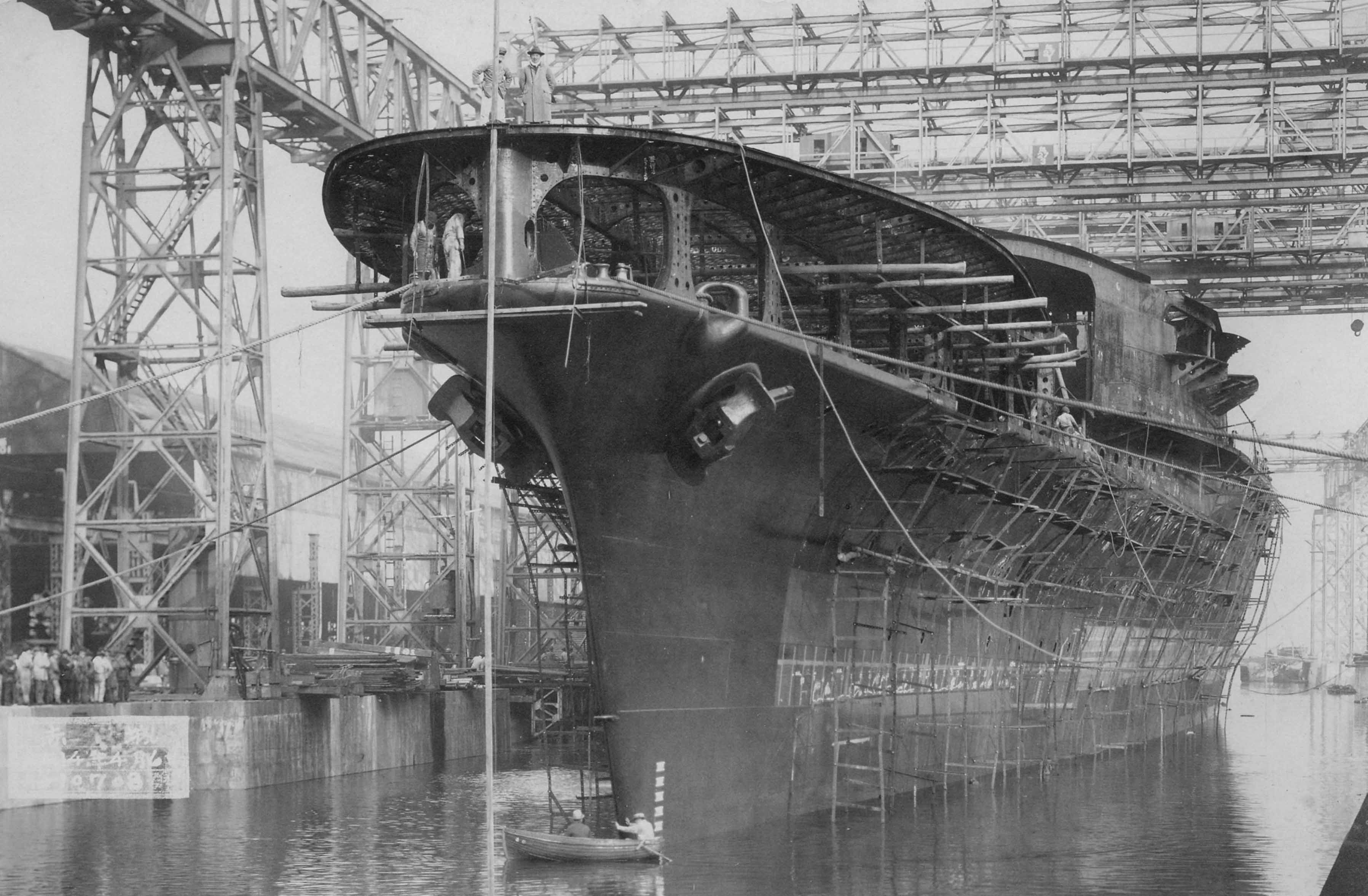
Akagi on 6 April 1925, prior to her launch at Kure

Construction of Akagi as an aircraft carrier began on 19 November 1923. Amagi's hull was damaged beyond economically feasible repair in the Great Kantō earthquake of 1 September 1923 and was broken up and scrapped. Akagi, the only remaining member of her class, was launched as a carrier on 22 April 1925 and commissioned at Kure Naval Arsenal on 25 March 1927, although trials continued through November 1927. She was the second carrier to enter service with the IJN, after Hōshō and before Kaga (which replaced Amagi).

Since Akagi was initially conceived as a battlecruiser, the prevailing ship naming conventions dictated that she (like her sister ships) be named after a mountain. Akagi came from Mount Akagi, a dormant volcano in the Kantō region (the name literally means "red castle"). After she was redesignated as an aircraft carrier, her mountain name remained, in contrast to ships like Sōryū that were originally built as aircraft carriers, which were named after flying creatures. Her name was previously given to the Maya-class gunboat Akagi.

Akagi was completed at a length of 261.21 meters (857 ft) overall. She had a beam of 31 meters (101 ft 8 in) and, at deep load, a draft of 8.08 meters (26 ft 6 in). She displaced 26,900 long tons (27,300 t) at (standard) load, and 34,364 long tons (34,920 t) at full load, nearly 7,000 long tons (7,100 t) less than her designed displacement as a battlecruiser. Her complement totaled 1,600 crewmembers.

=== Flight deck arrangements ===
Akagi and Kaga were completed with three superimposed flight decks, the only carriers ever to be designed so. The British carriers converted from "large light cruisers", Glorious, Courageous, and Furious, each had two flight decks, but there is no evidence that the Japanese copied the British model. It is more likely that it was a case of convergent evolution to improve launch and recovery cycle flexibility by allowing simultaneous launch and recovery of aircraft. Akagi's main flight deck was 190.2 meters (624 ft 0 in) long and 30.5 meters (100 ft) wide, her middle flight deck (beginning right in front of the bridge) was only 15 meters (49 ft 3 in) long and her lower flight deck was 55.02 meters (180 ft 6 in) long. The utility of her middle flight deck was questionable as it was so short that only some lightly loaded aircraft could use it, even in an era when the aircraft were much lighter and smaller than during World War II. The upper flight deck sloped slightly from amidships toward the bow and toward the stern to assist landings and takeoffs for the underpowered aircraft of that time.

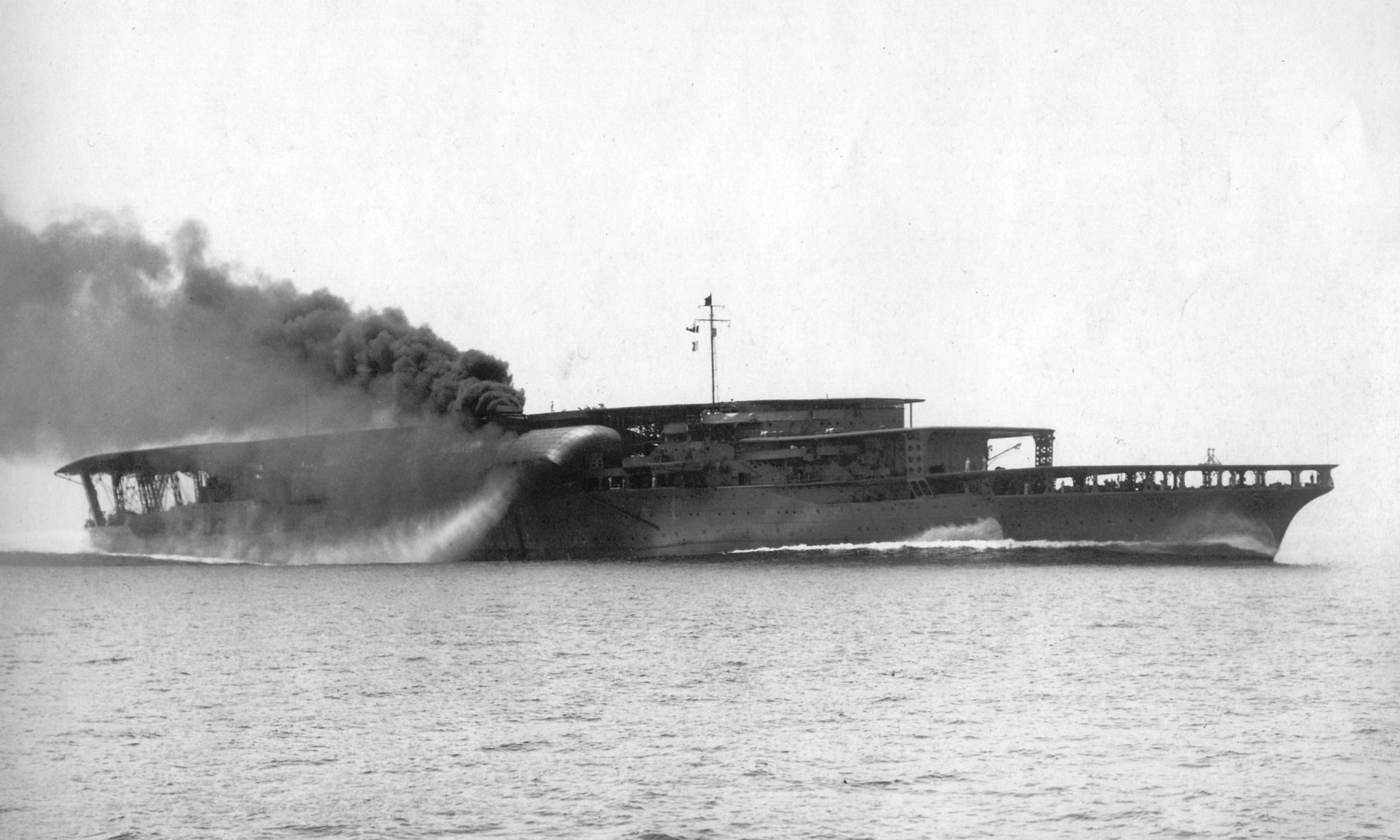
Akagi on trials off the coast of Iyo, 17 June 1927, with all three flight decks visible. In fact, the intermediate deck was not a flight deck.

As completed, the ship had two main hangar decks and a third auxiliary hangar, giving a total capacity of 60 aircraft. The third and lowest hangar deck was used only for storing disassembled aircraft. The two main hangars opened onto the middle and lower flight decks to allow aircraft to take off directly from the hangars while landing operations were in progress on the main flight deck above. The upper and middle hangar areas totaled about 80,375 square feet (7,467.1 m^{2}), the lower hangar about 8,515 square feet (791.1 m^{2}). No catapults were fitted. Her forward aircraft lift was offset to starboard and 11.8 by 13 meters (38 ft 9 in × 42 ft 8 in) in size. Her aft lift was on the centerline and 12.8 by 8.4 meters (42 ft 0 in × 27 ft 7 in). The aft elevator serviced the upper flight deck and all three hangar decks. Her arresting gear was an unsatisfactory British longitudinal system used on the carrier Furious that relied on friction between the arrester hook and the cables. The Japanese were well aware of this system's flaws, as it was already in use on their first carrier, Hōshō, but had no alternatives available when Akagi was completed. It was replaced during the ship's refit in 1931 with a Japanese-designed transverse cable system with six wires and that was replaced in turn before Akagi began her modernization in 1935 by the Kure Model 4 type (Kure shiki 4 gata). There was no island superstructure when the carrier was completed; the carrier was commanded from a space below the forward end of the upper flight deck. The ship carried approximately 150,000 US gallons (570,000 L) of aviation fuel for her embarked aircraft.

As originally completed, Akagi carried an air group of 28 Mitsubishi B1M3 torpedo bombers, 16 Nakajima A1N fighters and 16 Mitsubishi 2MR reconnaissance aircraft.

=== Armament and armor ===
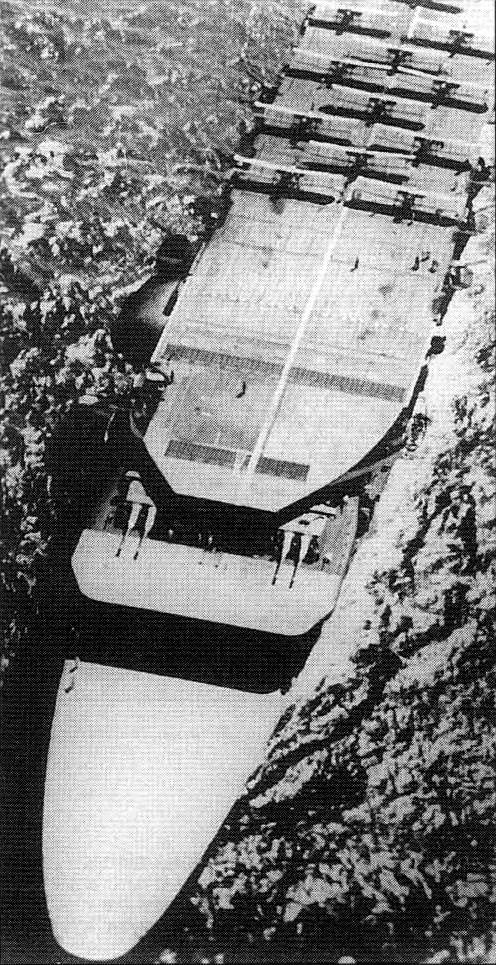
Akagi underway in 1929 with aircraft on the upper flight deck and two 20 cm gun turrets on the middle flight deck

Akagi was armed with ten 50-caliber 20 cm 3rd Year Type No. 1 guns, six in casemates aft and the rest in two twin-gun turrets, one on each side of the middle flight deck. They fired 110-kilogram (240 lb) projectiles at a rate of 3–6 rounds per minute with a muzzle velocity of 870 m/s (2,900 ft/s) at 25°, this provided a maximum range between 22,600 and 24,000 meters (24,700 and 26,200 yd). The turrets were nominally capable of 70° elevation to provide additional anti-aircraft fire, but in practice the maximum elevation was only 55°. The slow rate of fire and the fixed 5° loading angle minimized any real anti-aircraft capability. This heavy gun armament was provided in case she was surprised by enemy cruisers and forced to give battle, but her large and vulnerable flight deck, hangars, and superstructure made her more of a target in any surface action than a fighting warship. Carrier doctrine was still evolving at this time and the impracticality of carriers engaging in gun duels had not yet been realized. (Note: The United States Navy did much the same with the provision of four twin 8-inch (203 mm) gun turrets on their Lexington-class carriers.)

The ship carried dedicated anti-aircraft armament of six twin 45-caliber 12 cm 10th Year Type gun mounts fitted on sponsons below the level of the funnels, where they could not fire across the flight deck, three mounts per side. These guns fired 20.3-kilogram (45 lb) projectiles at a muzzle velocity of 825–830 m/s (2,710–2,720 ft/s); at 45°, this provided a maximum range of 16,000 meters (17,000 yd), and they had a maximum ceiling of 10,000 meters (11,000 yd) at 75° elevation. Their effective rate of fire was 6–8 rounds per minute.

Akagi's waterline armored belt was reduced from 254 to 152 mm (10 to 6 in) and placed lower on the ship than originally designed. The upper part of her torpedo bulge was given 102 mm (4 in) of armor. Her deck armor was also reduced from 96 to 79 mm (3.8 to 3.1 in). The modifications improved the ship's stability by helping compensate for the increased topside weight of the double hangar deck.

=== Propulsion ===
In Akagi's predecessor, Hōshō, the hot exhaust gases vented by swivelling funnels posed a danger to the ship, and wind-tunnel testing had not suggested any solutions. Akagi and Kaga were given different solutions to evaluate in real-world conditions. Akagi was given two funnels on the starboard side. The larger, forward funnel was angled 30° below horizontal with its mouth facing the sea, and the smaller one exhausted vertically a little past the edge of the flight deck. The forward funnel was fitted with a water-cooling system to reduce the turbulence caused by hot exhaust gases and a cover that could be raised to allow the exhaust gases to escape if the ship developed a severe list and the mouth of the funnel touched the sea. Kaga adopted a version of this configuration when she was modernized during the mid-1930s.

Akagi was completed with four Gihon geared steam turbine sets, each driving one propeller shaft, that produced a total of 131,000 shaft horsepower (98,000 kW). Steam for these turbines was provided by nineteen Type B Kampon boilers with a working pressure of 20 kg/cm^{2} (1,961 kPa; 284 psi). Some boilers were oil-fired, and the others used a mix of fuel oil and coal. As a battlecruiser, she was expected to achieve 28.5 knots (52.8 km/h; 32.8 mph), but the reduction in displacement from 41,200 to 34,000 long tons (41,900 to 34,500 t) increased her maximum speed to 32.5 knots (60.2 km/h; 37.4 mph), which was reached during her sea trials on 17 June 1927. She carried 3,900 long tons (4,000 t) of fuel oil and 2,100 long tons (2,100 t) of coal that gave her a range of 8,000 nautical miles (15,000 km; 9,200 mi) at 14 knots (26 km/h; 16 mph).

== Early service ==
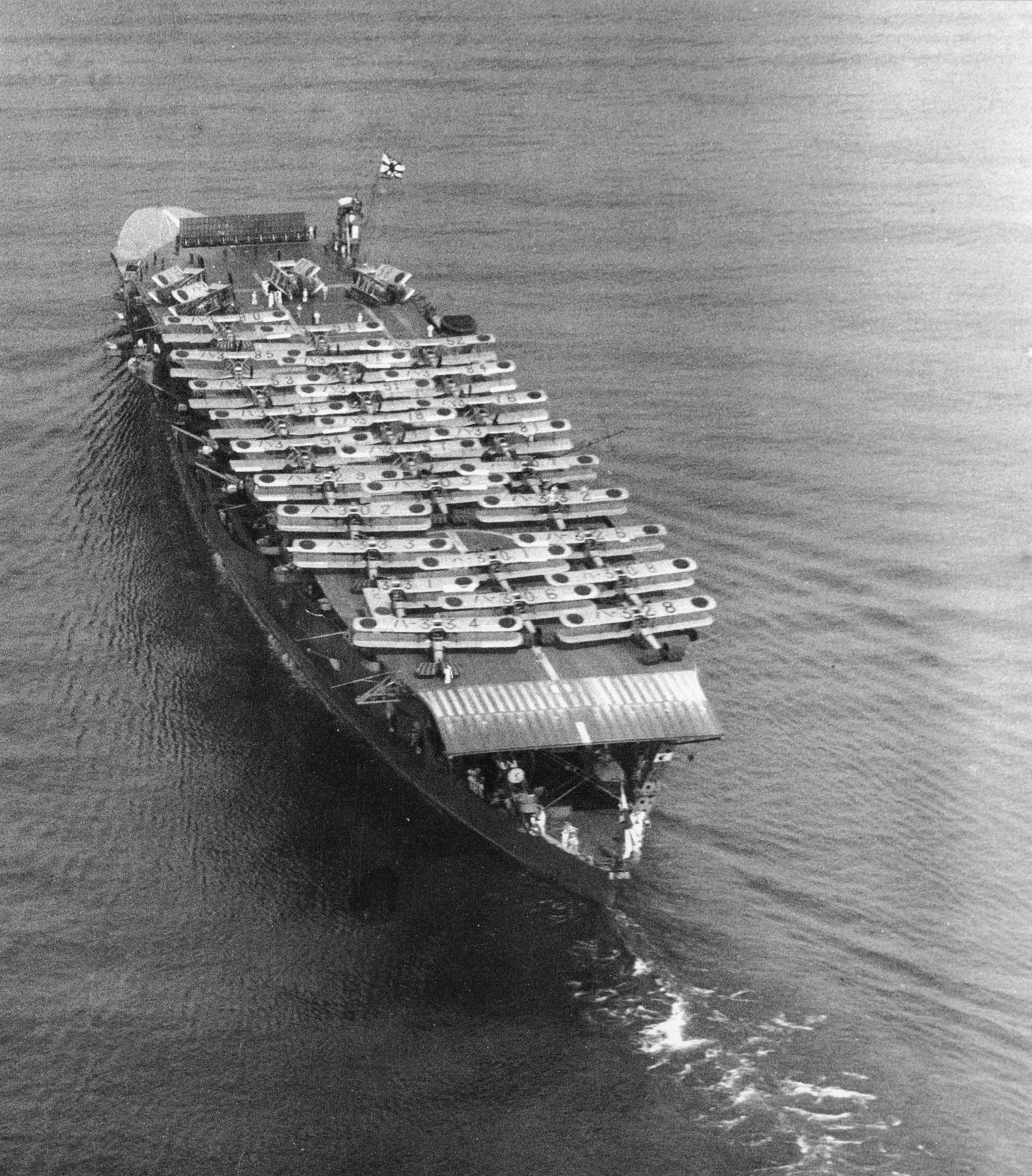
A stern view of Akagi off Osaka on 15 October 1934. On deck are Mitsubishi B1M and B2M bombers

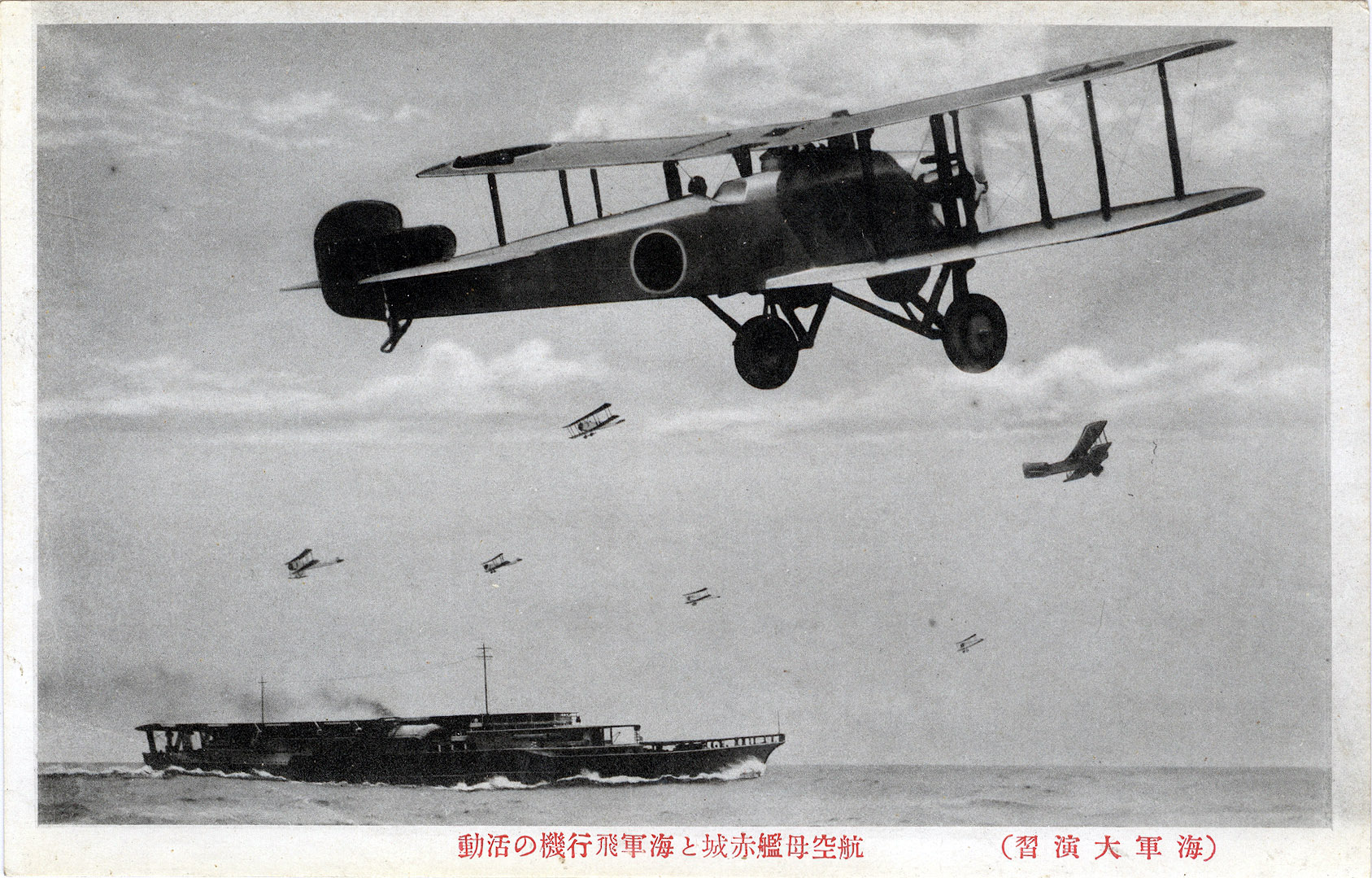
Akagi & Mitsubishi B1M, c1935

Akagi joined the Combined Fleet in August 1927 and was assigned to the First Carrier Division upon its formation on 1 April 1928, serving as the division's flagship under Rear Admiral Sankichi Takahashi. The carrier's early career was uneventful, consisting of various training exercises. From 10 December 1928 to 1 November 1929, the ship was captained by Isoroku Yamamoto, future commander of the Combined Fleet.

Akagi was reduced to second-class reserve status on 1 December 1931 in preparation for a short refit in which her arresting gear was replaced and her radio and ventilation systems were overhauled and improved. After completion of the refit, Akagi became a first-class reserve ship in December 1932. On 25 April 1933, she resumed active service and joined the Second Carrier Division and participated in that year's Special Fleet Maneuvers.

At this time, the IJN's carrier doctrine was still in its early stages. Akagi and the IJN's other carriers were initially given roles as tactical force multipliers supporting the fleet's battleships in the IJN's "decisive battle" doctrine. In this role, Akagi's aircraft were to attack enemy battleships with bombs and torpedoes. Aerial strikes against enemy carriers were later (beginning around 1932–1933) deemed of equal importance, with the goal of establishing air superiority during the initial stages of battle. The essential component in this strategy was that the Japanese carrier aircraft must be able to strike first with a massed, preemptive aerial attack. In fleet training exercises, the carriers began to operate together in front of or with the main battle line. The new strategy emphasized maximum speed from both the carriers and the aircraft they carried as well as larger aircraft with greater range. Thus, longer flight decks on the carriers were required in order to handle the newer, heavier aircraft which were entering service. As a result, on 15 November 1935 Akagi was placed in third-class reserve to begin an extensive modernization at Sasebo Naval Arsenal.

== Reconstruction ==
Akagi's modernization involved far less work than that of Kaga, but took three times as long due to financial difficulties related to the Great Depression. The ship's three flight decks were judged too small to handle the larger and heavier aircraft then coming into service. As a result, the middle and lower flight decks were eliminated in favor of two enclosed hangar decks that extended almost the full length of the ship. The upper and middle hangar areas' total space increased to about 93,000 square feet (8,600 m^{2}); the lower hangar remained the same size. The upper flight deck was extended to the bow, increasing its length to 249.17 meters (817 ft 6 in) and raising aircraft capacity to 86 (61 operational and 25 in storage). A third elevator midships, 11.8 by 13 meters (38 ft 9 in × 42 ft 8 in) in size, was added. Her arrester gear was replaced by a Japanese-designed, hydraulic Type 1 system with 9 wires. The modernization added an island superstructure on the port side of the ship, which was an unusual arrangement; the only other carrier to share this feature was a contemporary, the Hiryū. The port side was chosen as an experiment to see if that side was better for flight operations by moving the island away from the ship's exhaust outlets. The new flight deck inclined slightly fore and aft from a point about three-eighths of the way aft.

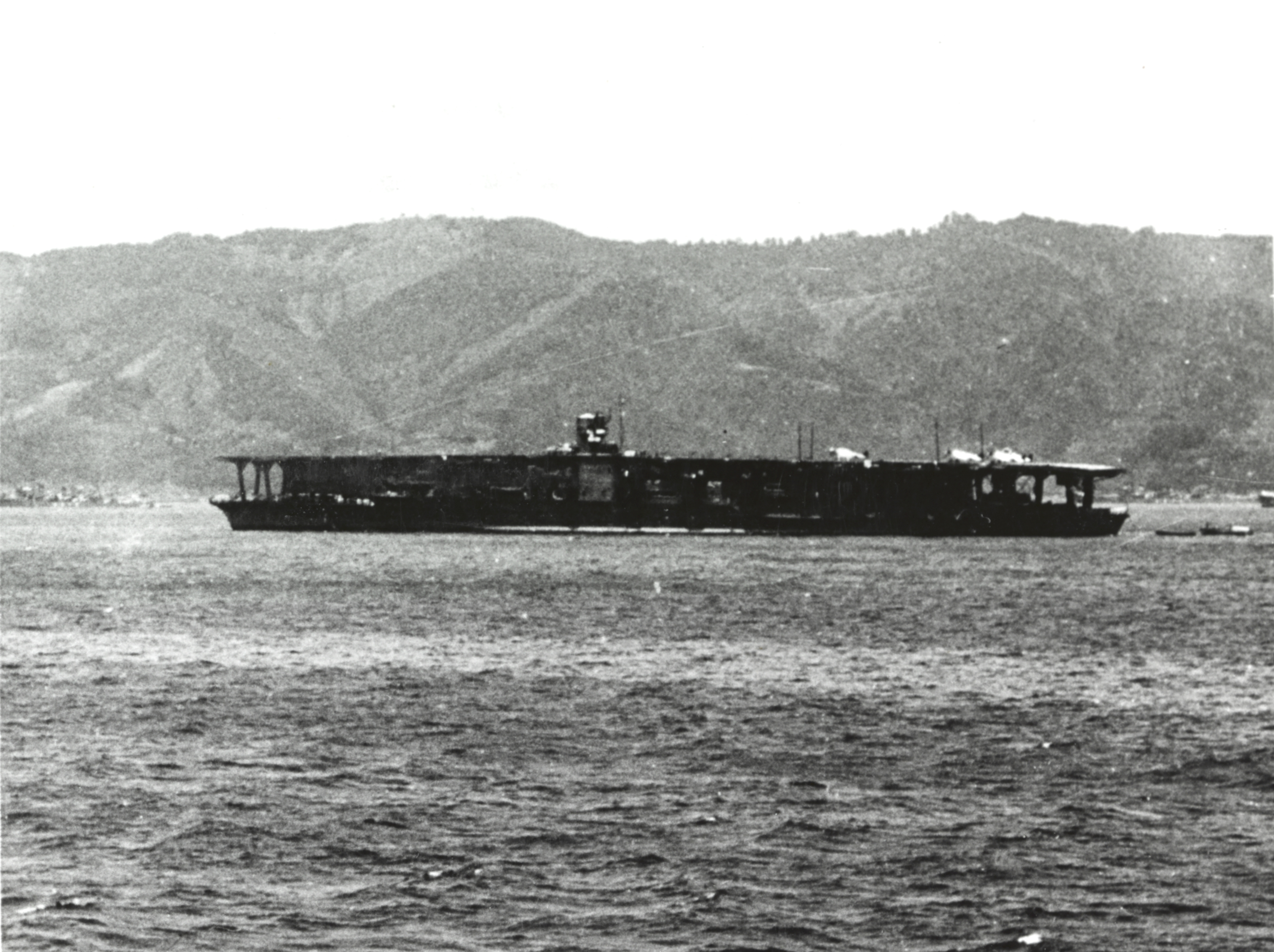
Akagi at Sukumo, Kōchi, in April 1939 with her new, single deck flight platform and island superstructure

Akagi's speed was already satisfactory and the only changes to her machinery were the replacement of the mixed coal/oil-fired boilers with modern oil-fired units and the improvement of the ventilation arrangements. Although the engine horsepower increased from 131,200 to 133,000, her speed declined slightly from 32.5 to 31.2 knots (60.2 to 57.8 km/h; 37.4 to 35.9 mph) on trials because of the increase in her displacement to 41,300 long tons (42,000 t). Her bunkerage was increased to 7,500 long tons (7,600 t) of fuel oil which increased her endurance to 10,000 nautical miles (18,520 km; 11,510 mi) at 16 knots (30 km/h; 18 mph). The rear vertical funnel was changed to match the forward funnel and incorporated into the same casing.

The two 20 cm gun turrets on the middle flight deck were removed and 14 twin 25 mm (1 in) Type 96 gun mounts were added on sponsons. They fired .25-kilogram (0.55 lb) projectiles at a muzzle velocity of 900 m/s (3,000 ft/s); at 50°, this provided a maximum range of 7,500 m (8,200 yd), and an effective ceiling of 5,500 m (18,000 ft). The maximum effective rate of fire was only between 110 and 120 rounds per minute due to the frequent need to change the 15-round magazines. Six Type 95 directors were fitted to control the new 25 mm guns and two new Type 94 anti-aircraft directors replaced the outdated Type 91s. After the modernization, Akagi carried one Type 89 director for the 20 cm (7.9 in) guns; it is uncertain how many were carried before then. The ship's crew increased to 2,000 after the reconstruction.

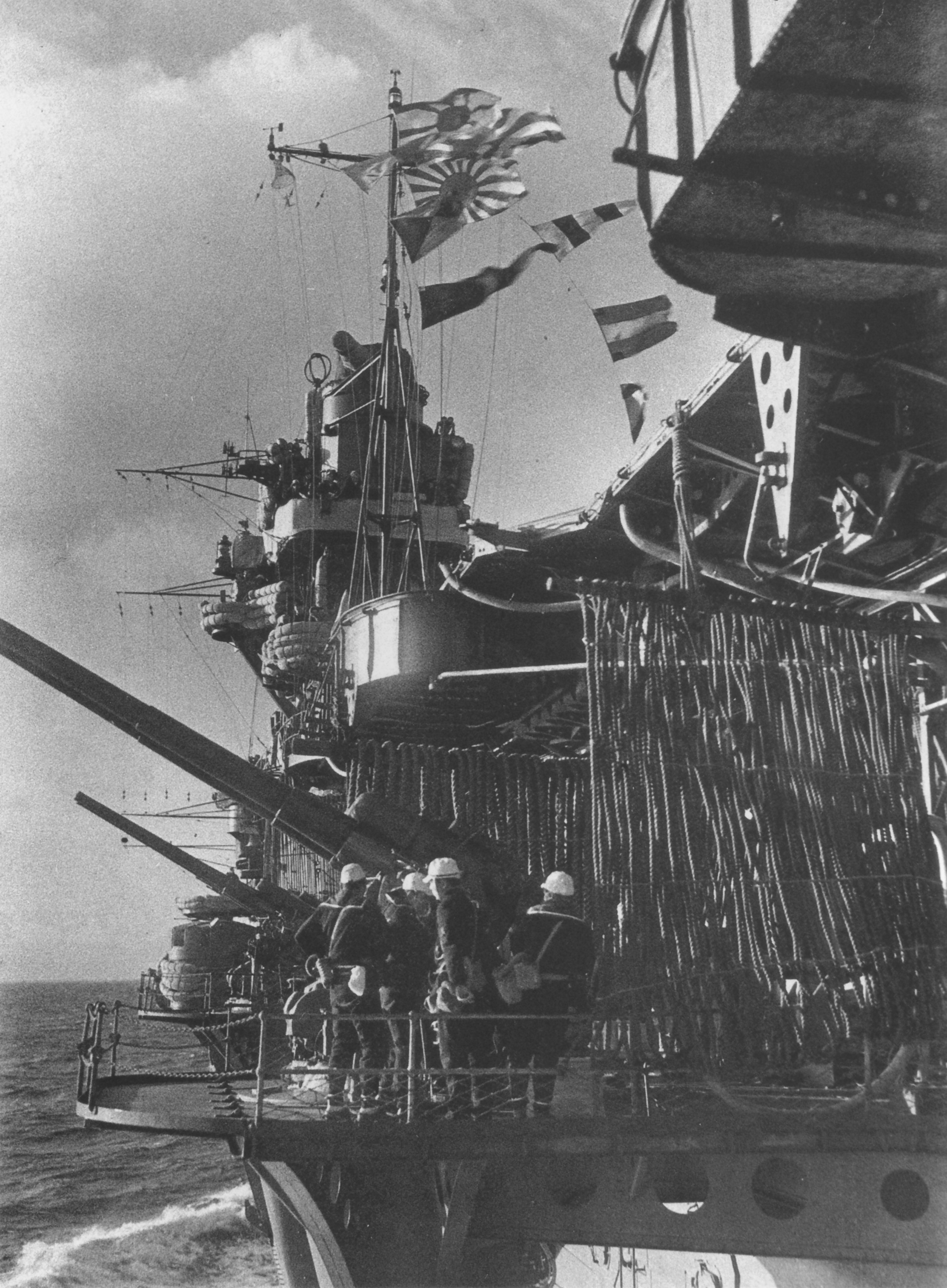
Port-side anti-aircraft gun sponsons in Akagi, showing their low-mounted position on the hull, which greatly restricted their arc of fire.

The ship's anti-aircraft guns were grouped amidships and placed relatively low on the hull. Thus, the guns could not be brought to bear directly forward or aft. Also, the island blocked the forward arcs of the port battery. As a result, the ship was vulnerable to attack by dive bombers. The ship's 12 cm 10th Year Type guns were scheduled to be replaced by more modern 12.7 cm (5 in) Type 89 mounts in 1942. The anti-aircraft sponsons were to be raised one deck to allow them some measure of cross-deck fire as was done during Kaga's modernization. However, the ship was lost in combat before the upgrade could take place.

Several major weaknesses in Akagi's design were not rectified. Akagi's aviation fuel tanks were incorporated directly into the structure of the carrier, meaning that shocks to the ship, such as those caused by bomb or shell hits, would be transmitted directly to the tanks, resulting in cracks or leaks. Also, the fully enclosed structure of the new hangar decks made firefighting difficult, at least in part because fuel vapors could accumulate in the hangars. Adding to the danger was the requirement of the Japanese carrier doctrine that aircraft be serviced, fueled, and armed whenever possible on the hangar decks rather than on the flight deck. Furthermore, the carrier's hangar and flight decks carried little armor protection, and there was no redundancy in the ship's fire-extinguishing systems. These weaknesses would later be crucial factors in the loss of the ship.

== Lead-up to World War II ==
Akagi's modernization was completed on 31 August 1938. She was reclassified as a first reserve ship on 15 November, but did not rejoin the First Carrier Division until the following month. In her new configuration, the carrier embarked 12 Mitsubishi A5M Type 96 "Claude" fighters with four disassembled spares, 19 Aichi D1A "Susie" dive bombers with five spares, and 35 Yokosuka B4Y "Jean" horizontal/torpedo bombers with 16 spares. She sailed for southern Chinese waters on 30 January 1939 and supported ground operations there, including attacks on Guilin and Liuzhou, until 19 February, when she returned to Japan. Akagi supported operations in central China between 27 March and 2 April 1940. She was reclassified as a special purpose ship (Tokubetse Ilomokan) on 15 November 1940, while she was being overhauled.

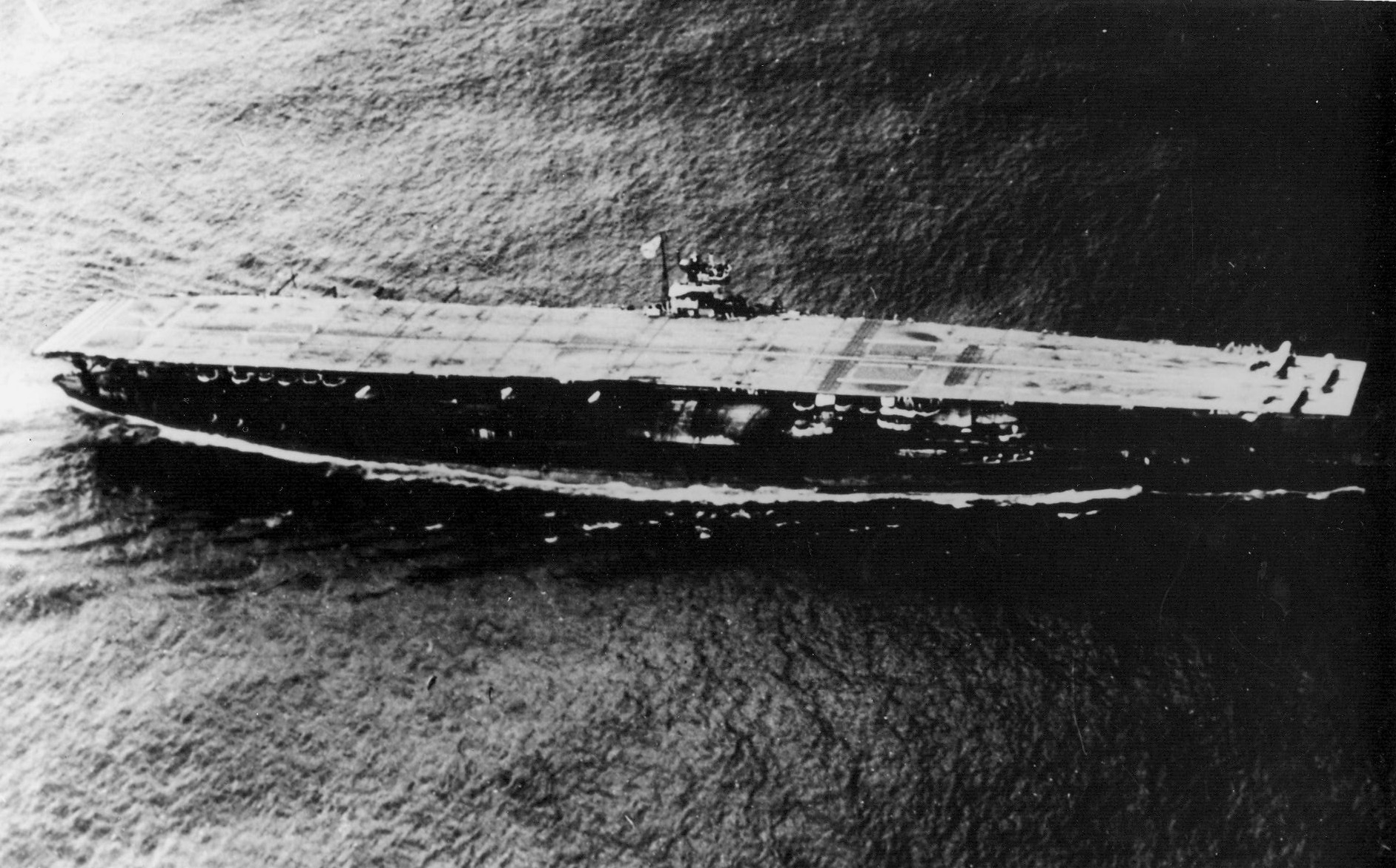
Akagi in the summer of 1941

The Japanese experiences off China had helped further develop the IJN's carrier doctrine. One lesson learned in China was the importance of concentration and mass in projecting naval air power ashore. Therefore, in April 1941, the IJN formed the First Air Fleet, or Kido Butai, to combine all of its fleet carriers under a single command. On 10 April, Akagi and Kaga were assigned to the First Carrier Division as part of the new carrier fleet, which also included the Second (with carriers Hiryū and Sōryū), and Fifth (with Shōkaku and Zuikaku) carrier divisions. The IJN centered its doctrine on air strikes that combined the air groups of entire carrier divisions, rather than individual carriers. When multiple carrier divisions were operating together, the divisions' air groups were combined. This doctrine of combined, massed, carrier-based air attack groups was the most advanced of its kind in the world. The IJN, however, remained concerned that concentrating all of its carriers together would render them vulnerable to being wiped out all at once by a massive enemy air or surface strike. Thus, the IJN developed a compromise solution in which the fleet carriers would operate closely together within their carrier divisions but the divisions themselves would operate in loose rectangular formations, with approximately 7,000 meters (7,700 yd) separating each carrier.

The Japanese doctrine held that entire carrier air groups should not be launched in a single massed attack. Instead, each carrier would launch a "deckload strike" of all its aircraft that could be spotted at one time on each flight deck. Subsequent attack waves consisted of the next deckload of aircraft. Thus, First Air Fleet air attacks would often consist of at least two massed waves of aircraft. The First Air Fleet was not considered to be the IJN's primary strategic striking force. The IJN still considered the First Air Fleet an integral component in the Combined Fleet's Kantai Kessen or "decisive battle" task force centered on battleships. Akagi was designated as the flagship for the First Air Fleet, a role the ship retained until her sinking 14 months later.

Although the concentration of so many fleet carriers into a single unit was a new and revolutionary offensive strategic concept, the First Air Fleet suffered from several defensive deficiencies that gave it, in Mark Peattie's words, a "'glass jaw': it could throw a punch but couldn't take one." Japanese carrier anti-aircraft guns and associated fire-control systems had several design and configuration deficiencies that limited their effectiveness. Also, the IJN's fleet combat air patrol (CAP) consisted of too few fighter aircraft and was hampered by an inadequate early warning system, including lack of radar. In addition, poor radio communications with the fighter aircraft inhibited effective command and control of the CAP. Furthermore, the carriers' escorting warships were not trained or deployed to provide close anti-aircraft support. These deficiencies, combined with the shipboard weaknesses previously detailed, would eventually doom Akagi and other First Air Fleet carriers.

== World War II ==
=== Pearl Harbor and subsequent operations ===
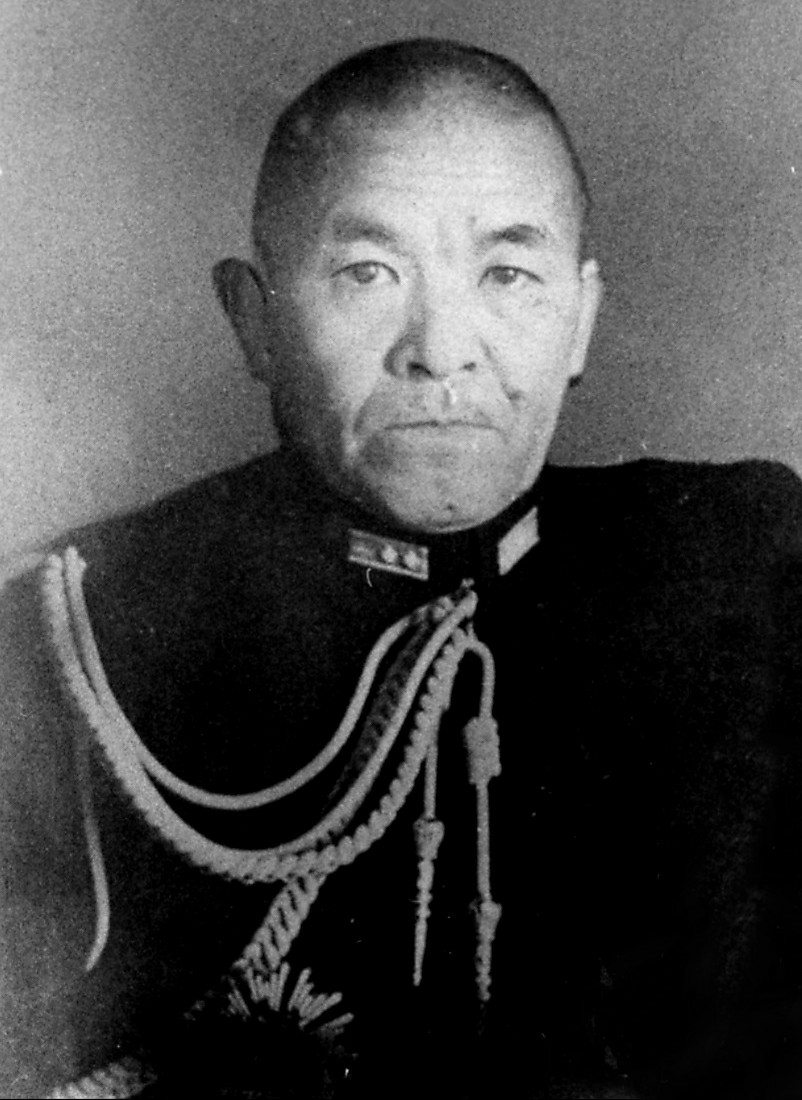
First Air Fleet commander Vice Admiral Chūichi Nagumo, for whom Akagi served as flagship from Pearl Harbor to Midway

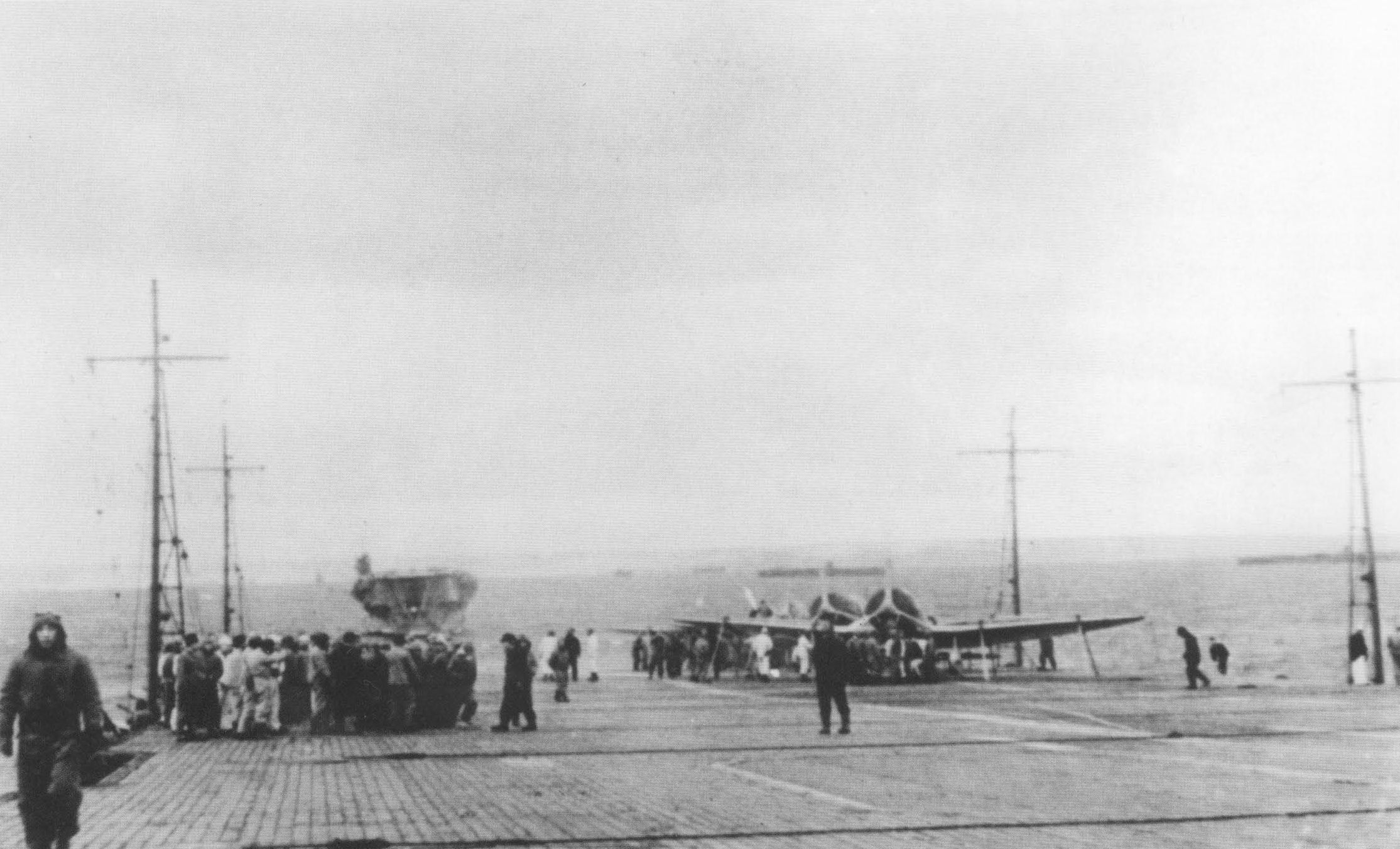
Crewmembers gather on the flight deck of Akagi at Hitokappu Bay, Kuriles in November 1941 prior to the attack on Pearl Harbor. The other carriers in the background are, from left to right: Kaga, Shōkaku, Zuikaku, Hiryū, and Sōryū.

In preparation for the attack, the ship was anchored at Ariake Bay, Kyushu beginning in September 1941 while her aircraft were based at Kagoshima to train with the other 1st Air Fleet air units for the Pearl Harbor operation. Once preparations and training were completed, Akagi assembled with the rest of the First Air Fleet at Hitokappu Bay in the Kuril Islands on 22 November 1941. The ships departed on 26 November 1941 for Hawaii.

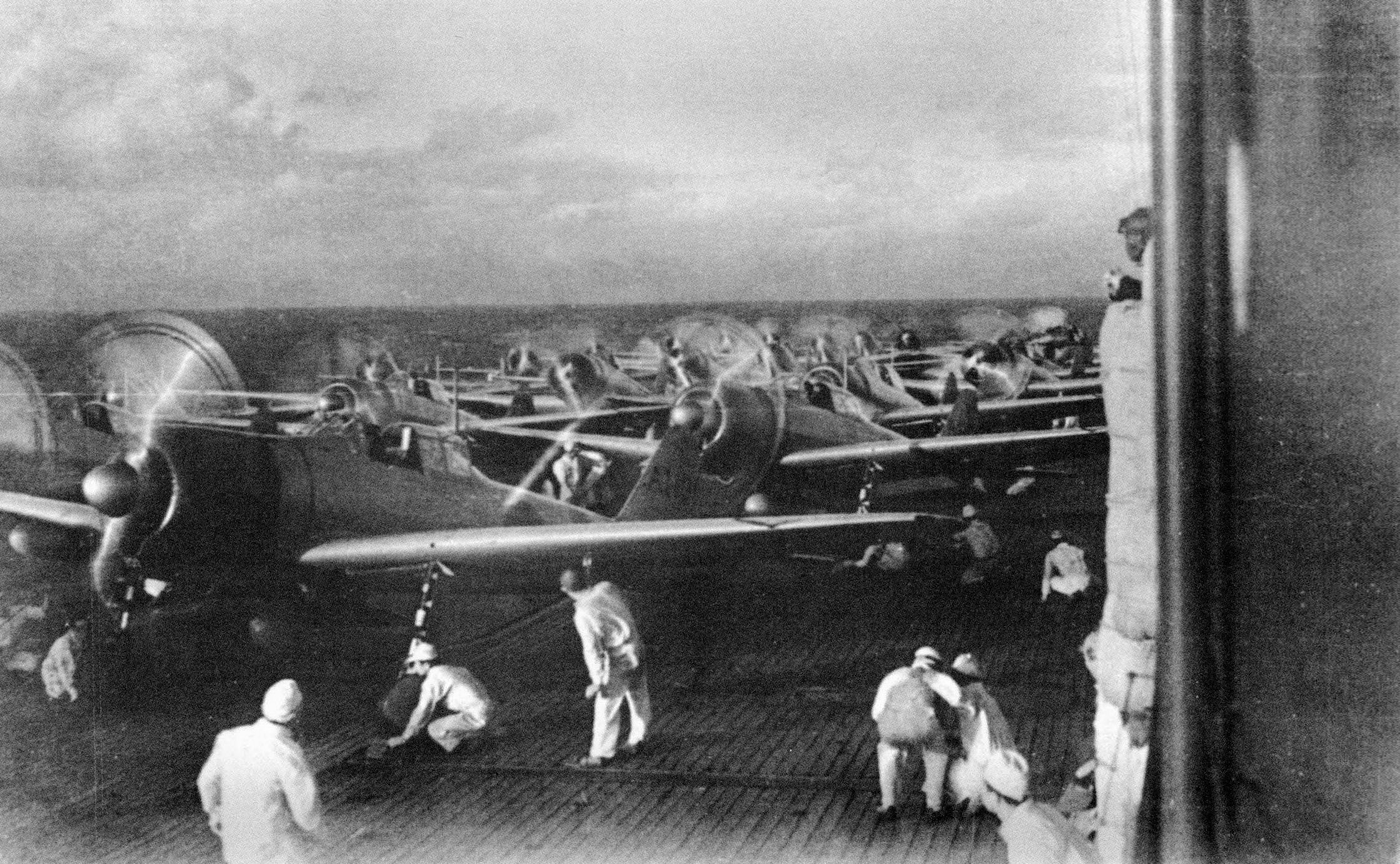
A6M2 Zero fighters prepare to launch from Akagi as part of the second wave during the attack on Pearl Harbor

Commanded by Captain Kiichi Hasegawa, Akagi was Vice Admiral Chūichi Nagumo's flagship for the striking force for the attack on Pearl Harbor that attempted to cripple the United States Pacific Fleet. Akagi and the other five carriers, from a position 230 nautical miles (430 km; 260 mi) north of Oahu, launched two waves of aircraft on the morning of 7 December 1941. In the first wave, 27 Nakajima B5N "Kate" torpedo bombers from Akagi torpedoed the battleships Oklahoma, West Virginia, and California while 9 of the ship's Mitsubishi A6M Zeros attacked the air base at Hickam Field. In the second wave, 18 Aichi D3A "Val" dive bombers from the carrier targeted the battleships Maryland and Pennsylvania, the light cruiser Raleigh, the destroyer Shaw, and the fleet oiler Neosho while nine "Zeros" attacked various American airfields. One of the carrier's Zeros was shot down by American anti-aircraft guns during the first wave attack, killing its pilot, while four D3As were shot down in the second wave. In addition to the aircraft which participated in the raid, three of the carrier's fighters were assigned to the CAP. One of the carrier's Zero fighters attacked a Boeing B-17 Flying Fortress heavy bomber that had just arrived from the mainland, setting it on fire as it landed at Hickam, killing one of its crew.

In January 1942, together with the rest of the First and Fifth Carrier Divisions, Akagi supported the invasion of Rabaul in the Bismarck Archipelago, as the Japanese moved to secure their southern defensive perimeter against attacks from Australia. She provided 20 B5Ns and 9 Zeros for the initial airstrike on Rabaul on 20 January 1942. The First Carrier Division attacked Allied positions at nearby Kavieng the following day, of which Akagi contributed 9 A6M Zeros and 18 D3As. On the 22nd, Akagi's D3As and Zeros again attacked Rabaul before returning to Truk on 27 January. The Second Carrier Division, with Sōryū and Hiryū, had been detached to support the invasion of Wake Island on 23 December 1941 and did not reunite with the rest of the carrier mobile striking force until February 1942.

Akagi, along with Kaga and the carrier Zuikaku, sortied in search of American naval forces raiding the Marshall Islands on 1 February 1942, before being recalled. On 7 February Akagi and the carriers of the First and Second Carrier Divisions were ordered south to the Timor Sea where, on 19 February, from a point 100 nautical miles (190 km; 120 mi) southeast of the easternmost tip of Timor, they launched air strikes against Darwin, Australia, in an attempt to destroy its port and airfield facilities to prevent any interference with the invasion of Java. Akagi contributed 18 B5Ns, 18 D3As, and 9 Zeros to the attack, which caught the defenders by surprise. Eleven ships were sunk and fourteen more were damaged. None of the carrier's aircraft were lost in the attack and the attack was effective in preventing Darwin from contributing to the Allied defense of Java. On 1 March, the American oiler Pecos was sunk by D3As from Sōryū and Akagi. Later that same day the American destroyer Edsall was attacked and sunk by D3As from Akagi, Sōryū, and Hiryū in combination with gunfire from two battleships and two heavy cruisers of the escort force. Akagi and her consorts covered the invasion of Java, although her main contribution appears to have been providing 18 B5Ns and 9 Zeros for the 5 March air strike on Tjilatjap. This group was very successful, sinking eight ships in the harbor there and none of Akagi's aircraft were lost. Most of the Allied forces in the Dutch East Indies surrendered to the Japanese later in March. The Kido Butai then sailed for Staring Bay on Celebes Island to refuel and recuperate.

=== Indian Ocean raid ===
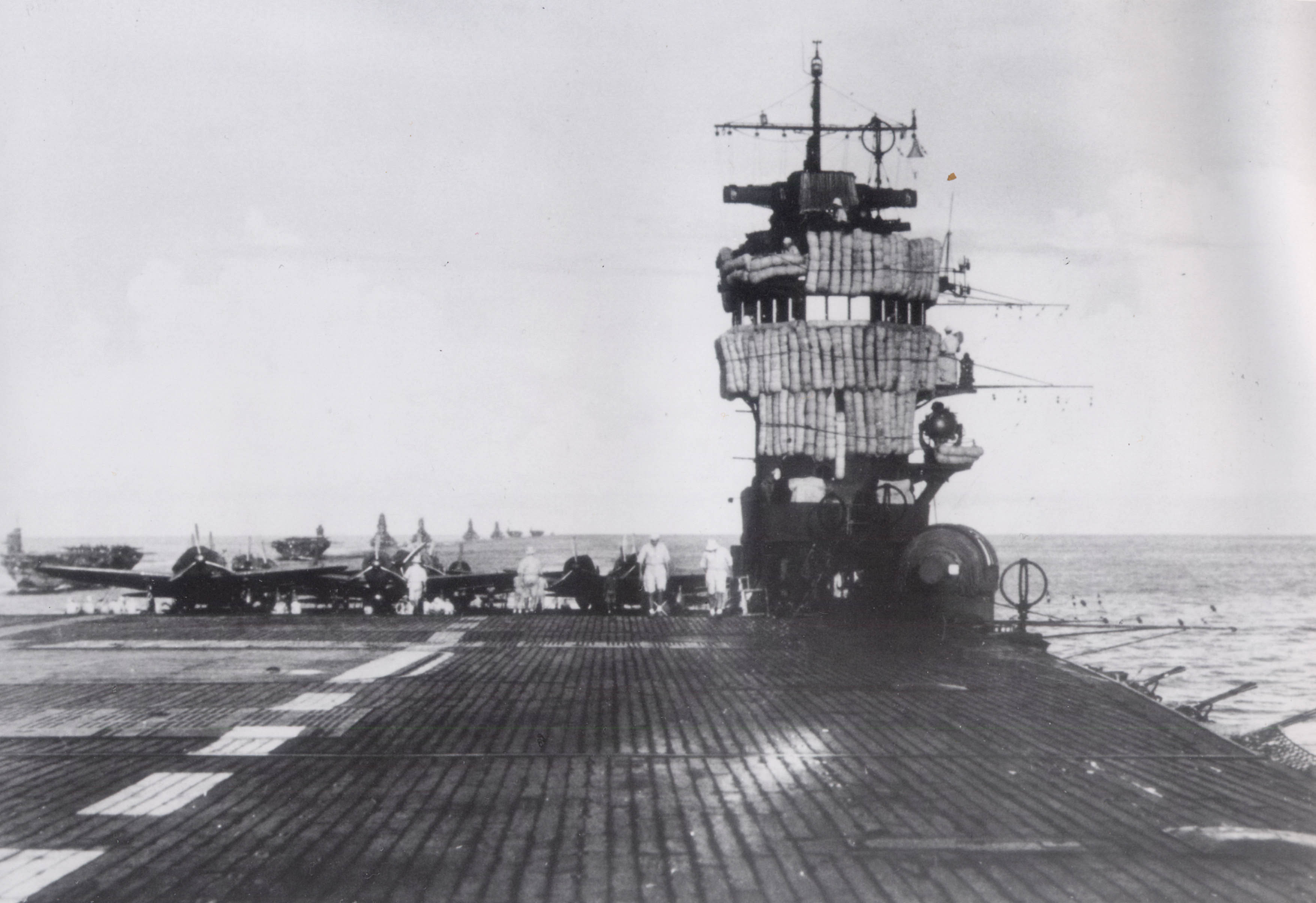
Akagi leaving Celebes Island for the attack on Colombo, 26 March 1942. In the background are other carriers and battleships of the carrier striking force. Rolled futon mattresses have been lashed to the island to provide extra protection from enemy attack.

On 26 March, Akagi set sail for the Indian Ocean raid with the rest of the Kido Butai. The Japanese intent was to defeat the British Eastern Fleet and destroy British airpower in the region in order to secure the flank of their operations in Burma. On 5 April 1942, Akagi launched 17 B5Ns and 9 Zeros in an air strike against Colombo, Ceylon, which damaged the port facilities. None of the aircraft were lost and the Zero pilots claimed to have shot down a dozen of the defending British fighters. Later that day, 17 D3As from Akagi helped to sink the British heavy cruisers Cornwall and Dorsetshire. On 9 April, she attacked Trincomalee with 18 B5Ns, escorted by 6 Zeros which claimed to have shot down 5 Hawker Hurricane fighters (only two of which can be confirmed from Allied records) without loss to themselves. Meanwhile, a floatplane from the battleship Haruna spotted the small aircraft carrier Hermes, escorted by the Australian destroyer Vampire, and every available D3A was launched to attack the ships. Akagi contributed 17 dive bombers and they helped to sink both ships; they also spotted the oil tanker RFA Athelstane, escorted by the corvette Hollyhock, and sank both without loss. During the day's actions, the carrier narrowly escaped damage when nine British Bristol Blenheim bombers from Ceylon penetrated the CAP and dropped their bombs from 11,000 feet (3,400 m), just missing the carrier and the heavy cruiser Tone. Four of the Blenheims were subsequently shot down by CAP fighters and one was shot down by aircraft from the carriers' returning air strike. After the raid, the carrier mobile striking force returned to Japan to refit and replenish.

On 19 April 1942, while near Taiwan during the transit to Japan, Akagi, Sōryū, and Hiryū were sent in pursuit of the American carriers Hornet and Enterprise, which had launched the Doolittle Raid. They found only empty ocean, however, for the American carriers had immediately departed the area to return to Hawaii. Akagi and the other carriers shortly abandoned the chase and dropped anchor at Hashirajima anchorage on 22 April. On 25 April, Captain Taijiro Aoki relieved Hasegawa as skipper of the carrier. Having been engaged in constant operations for four and a half months, the ship, along with the other three carriers of the First and Second Carrier Divisions, was hurriedly refitted and replenished in preparation for the Combined Fleet's next major operation, scheduled to begin one month hence. The Fifth Carrier Division, with Shōkaku and Zuikaku, had been detached in mid-April to support Operation Mo, resulting in the Battle of the Coral Sea. While at Hashirajima, Akagi's air group was based ashore in Kagoshima and conducted flight and weapons training with the other First Air Fleet carrier units.

=== Midway ===
Concerned by the US carrier strikes in the Marshall Islands, Lae-Salamaua, and the Doolittle raids, Yamamoto determined to force the US Navy into a showdown to eliminate the American carrier threat. He decided to invade and occupy Midway Island, which he was sure would draw out the American carrier forces to battle. The Japanese codenamed the Midway invasion Operation MI.

On 25 May 1942, Akagi set out with the Combined Fleet's carrier striking force in the company of carriers Kaga, Hiryū, and Sōryū, which constituted the First and Second Carrier Divisions, for the attack on Midway Island. Once again, Nagumo flew his flag on Akagi. Because of damage and losses suffered during the Battle of the Coral Sea, the Fifth Carrier Division with carriers Shōkaku and Zuikaku were absent from the operation. Akagi's aircraft complement consisted of 24 Zeros, 18 D3As, and 18 B5Ns. (Note: Six of the Zeros were intended to be stationed on Midway after the invasion and belonged to the 6th Air Group. At least three of these six aircraft were used for combat operations by the carrier's crew during the resulting battle.)

With the fleet positioned 250 nautical miles (460 km; 290 mi) northwest of Midway Island at dawn (04:45 local time) on 4 June 1942, Akagi's portion of the 108-plane combined air raid was a strike on the airfield on Eastern Island with 18 dive bombers escorted by nine Zeros. The carrier's B5Ns were armed with torpedoes and kept ready in case enemy ships were discovered during the Midway operation. The only loss during the raid from Akagi's air group was one Zero shot down by AA fire and three damaged; four dive bombers were damaged, of which one could not be repaired. Unbeknownst to the Japanese, the US Navy had discovered the Japanese MI plan by breaking the Japanese cipher and had prepared an ambush using its three available carriers, positioned northeast of Midway.

One of Akagi's torpedo bombers was launched to augment the search for any American ships that might be in the area. (Note: Akagi's torpedo-bomber scout plane was assigned a search line of 181 degrees from the mobile striking force out to 300 nautical miles.) The carrier contributed three Zeros to the total of 11 assigned to the initial combat air patrol over the four carriers. By 07:00, the carrier had 11 fighters with the CAP which helped to defend the Kido Butai from the first US attackers from Midway Island at 07:10.

At this time, Nagumo's carriers were attacked by six US Navy Grumman TBF Avengers and four United States Army Air Forces (USAAF) B-26 Marauders, all carrying torpedoes. The Avengers went after Hiryū while the Marauders attacked Akagi. The 30 CAP Zeroes in the air at this time, including the 11 from Akagi, immediately attacked the American aircraft, shooting down five of the Avengers and two of the B-26s. One of Akagi's Zeroes, however, was shot down by defensive fire from the B-26s. Several of the Marauders dropped their torpedoes, but all either missed or failed to detonate. One B-26, piloted by Lieutenant James Muri, strafed Akagi after dropping its torpedo, killing two men. Another, seriously damaged by anti-aircraft fire, did not pull out of its run, and instead flew directly at Akagi's bridge. The aircraft, either attempting a suicide ramming, or out of control, narrowly missed striking the carrier's bridge, which could have killed Nagumo and his staff, and crashed into the ocean. This experience may well have contributed to Nagumo's determination to launch another attack on Midway, in direct violation of Yamamoto's order to keep the reserve strike force armed for anti-ship operations.

At 07:15, Nagumo ordered the B5Ns on Kaga and Akagi rearmed with bombs for another attack on Midway itself. This process was limited by the number of ordnance carts (used to handle the bombs and torpedoes) and ordnance elevators, preventing torpedoes from being struck below until after all the bombs were moved up from their magazine, assembled, and mounted on the aircraft. This process normally took about an hour and a half; more time would be required to bring the aircraft up to the flight deck, warm up and launch the strike group. Around 07:40, Nagumo reversed his order when he received a message from one of his scout aircraft that American warships had been spotted. Three of Akagi's CAP Zeroes landed aboard the carrier at 07:36. At 07:40, her lone scout returned, having sighted nothing. (Note: This recorded return time for Akagi's scout aircraft is odd since all the other carrier striking force scout planes had been assigned 600-mile search patterns and would not return for another one and a half to two hours.)

==== Sinking ====
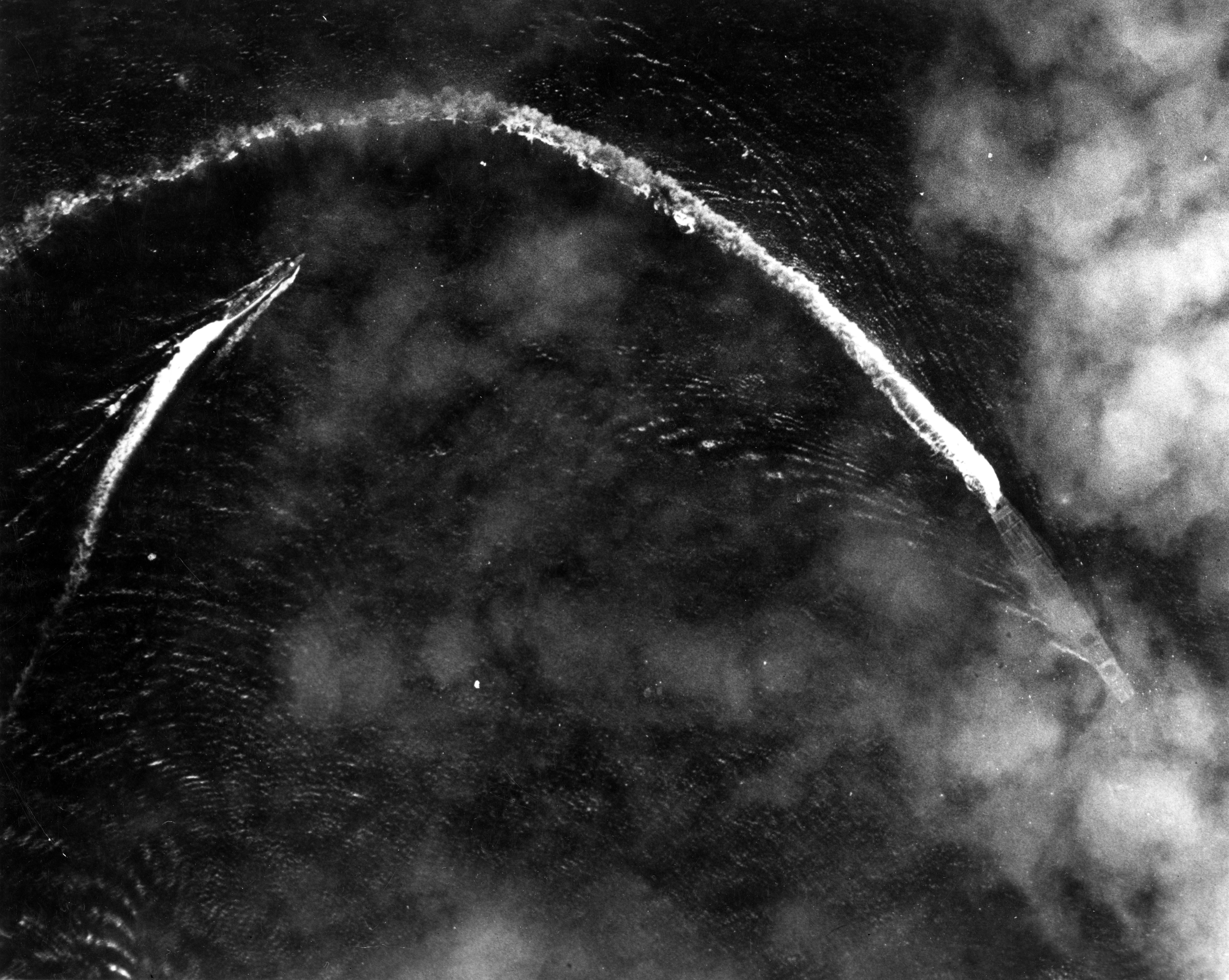
Akagi (right, partially obscured by clouds) takes evasive action during an aerial attack by US B-17s shortly after 08:00 on 4 June 1942. The trailing ship at left is probably the carrier's plane guard destroyer, Nowaki. The photograph was taken from one of the attacking B-17s.

At 07:55, the next American strike from Midway arrived in the form of 16 Marine SBD-2 Dauntless dive bombers of VMSB-241 under Major Lofton R. Henderson. (Note: To this day there is much confusion about VMSB-241 at Midway. At that time, the squadron was in transition from the obsolete SB2U Vindicator to the modern SBD-2 Dauntless and flew both aircraft during the battle.) Akagi's three remaining CAP fighters were among the nine still aloft that attacked Henderson's planes, shooting down six of them as they executed a fruitless glide bombing attack on Hiryū. At roughly the same time, the Japanese carriers were attacked by 12 USAAF B-17 Flying Fortresses, bombing from 20,000 feet (6,100 m). The high altitude of the bombers gave the Japanese captains enough time to anticipate where the bombs would land and successfully maneuver their ships out of the impact area. Four B-17s attacked Akagi, but missed with all their bombs.

Akagi reinforced the CAP with launches of three Zeros at 08:08 and four at 08:32. These fresh Zeros helped defeat the next American air strike from Midway, 11 Vought SB2U Vindicators from VMSB-241, which attacked the battleship Haruna starting around 08:30. Three of the Vindicators were shot down, and Haruna escaped damage. Although all the American air strikes had thus far caused negligible damage, they kept the Japanese carrier forces off-balance as Nagumo endeavored to prepare a response to news, received at 08:20, of the sighting of American carrier forces to his northeast.

Akagi began recovering her Midway strike force at 08:37 and finished shortly after 09:00. The landed aircraft were quickly struck below, while the carriers' crews began preparations to spot aircraft for the strike against the American carrier forces. The preparations, however, were interrupted at 09:18 when the first American carrier aircraft to attack were sighted. These consisted of 15 Douglas TBD Devastator torpedo bombers of VT-8, led by John C. Waldron from the carrier Hornet. The six airborne Akagi CAP Zeroes joined the other 15 CAP fighters currently aloft in destroying Waldron's planes. All 15 of the American planes were shot down as they attempted a torpedo attack on Soryū, leaving one surviving aviator treading water.

Shortly afterwards 14 Devastators from VT-6 from the carrier Enterprise, led by Eugene E. Lindsey, attacked. Lindsey's aircraft tried to sandwich Kaga, but the CAP, reinforced by an additional eight Zeros launched by Akagi at 09:33 and 09:40, shot down all but four of the Devastators, and Kaga dodged the torpedoes. Defensive fire from the Devastators shot down one of Akagi's Zeros. (Note: At 10:15, a torpedo bomber had departed the carrier on a scouting mission, but turned back, for unknown reasons, shortly thereafter. The aircraft was recovered by Hiryū and took part in that carrier's second strike against Yorktown.)

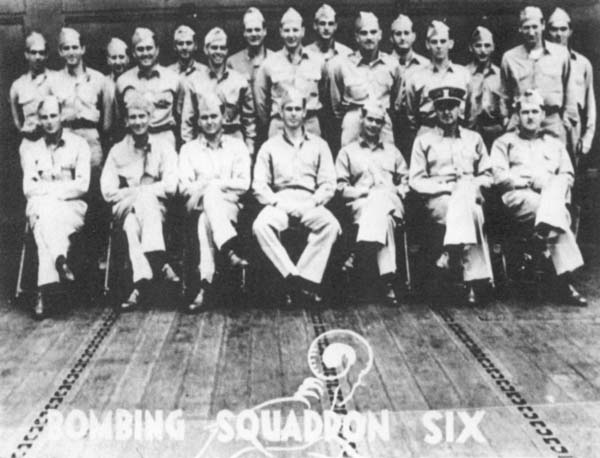
A group photo of the American dive bomber pilots of VB-6 from Enterprise, three of whom fatally damaged Akagi. Richard Best is sitting in the center of the front row. The other two who attacked Akagi with Best were Edwin J. Kroeger (standing, eighth from the left) and Frederick T. Weber (standing, sixth from the right).

Minutes after the torpedo plane attacks, American carrier-based dive bombers arrived over the Japanese carriers almost undetected and began their dives. It was at this time, around 10:20, that in the words of Jonathan Parshall and Anthony Tully, the "Japanese air defenses would finally and catastrophically fail." Twenty-eight dive bombers from Enterprise, led by C. Wade McClusky, began an attack on Kaga, hitting her with at least four bombs. At the last minute, one of McClusky's elements of three bombers from VB-6, led by squadron commander Richard Best who deduced Kaga to be fatally damaged, broke off and dove simultaneously on Akagi. At approximately 10:26, the three bombers hit her with one 1,000-pound (450 kg) bomb and just missed with two others. The first near-miss landed 5–10 m (16–33 ft) to port, near her island. The third bomb just missed the flight deck and plunged into the water next to the stern. The second bomb, likely dropped by Best, landed at the aft edge of the middle elevator and detonated in the upper hangar. This hit set off explosions among the fully armed and fueled B5N torpedo bombers that were being prepared for an air strike against the American carriers, resulting in an uncontrollable fire. (Note: American carrier dive bomber doctrine dictated that when two squadrons were presented with two priority targets, in this case Kaga and Akagi, the first squadron on scene was to attack the more distant target, in this case, Akagi. Apparently unfamiliar with this doctrine, McClusky led his squadron, the first to arrive, at Kaga. Best, following the doctrine, also initially went after Kaga. Only after seeing McClusky's squadron dive past him did Best decide to take his squadron after Akagi. However, most of VB-6 stuck with their original target, so only the lead element took part. Shortly before the dive bomber attack, Akagi had recovered five of its CAP Zeros. One Zero relaunched soon afterwards at 10:25, just as Best's bombers were entering their dives on his ship. The other recently landed Zeroes had probably already been taken to the hangar deck. There may have been two or three other Zeroes spotted on the flight deck when the ship was hit by Best's bomb.)

At 10:29, Aoki ordered the ship's magazines flooded. The forward magazines were promptly flooded, but the aft magazines were not due to valve damage, likely caused by the near miss aft. The ship's main water pump also appears to have been damaged, greatly hindering fire fighting efforts. On the upper hangar deck, at 10:32 damage control teams attempted to control the spreading fires by employing the one-shot CO_{2} fire-suppression system. Whether the system functioned or not is unclear, but the burning aviation fuel proved impossible to control, and serious fires began to advance deeper into the interior of the ship. At 10:40, additional damage caused by the near-miss aft made itself known when the ship's rudder jammed 30 degrees to starboard during an evasive maneuver.

Shortly thereafter, the fires broke through the flight deck and heat and smoke made the ship's bridge unusable. At 10:46, Nagumo transferred his flag to the light cruiser Nagara. (Note: Nagumo and his staff were forced to evacuate through the forward windows of the bridge by rope. Nagumo's chief of staff, Rear Admiral Ryūnosuke Kusaka, badly sprained both ankles and was burned during the evacuation. At 11:00, seven of Akagi's airborne CAP Zeros were recovered by Hiryū just after she had launched her first strike against the US carriers.) Akagi stopped dead in the water at 13:50 and her crew, except for Aoki and damage-control personnel, was evacuated. She continued to burn as her crew fought a losing battle against the spreading fires. (Note: Destroyers Arashi and Nowaki were directed to stand by the carrier throughout the rest of the day and through the night as she burned uncontrollably. After Kaga sank, Hagikaze and Maikaze joined Akagi's escorts. The carrier's engines, for unknown reasons, restarted around 12:30 and slowly moved the ship, still with a jammed rudder, in a large circle to starboard until they failed again at 13:50. Also, at 13:00, the aft magazines were finally flooded. A large explosion occurred at 15:00, blowing open the bulkhead overhanging the anchor deck.) The damage-control teams and Aoki were evacuated from the still floating ship later that night. (Note: Aoki refused to abandon ship with the damage control teams at 22:00 and had himself tied to the anchor capstan. Two hours later, the carrier's senior staff, accompanied by Captain Kosaku Ariga, commander of Destroyer Division 4, reboarded the carrier. Ariga, who was senior to Aoki, ordered him to abandon ship. Aoki was the only Japanese fleet carrier commander to survive the battle. He retired from the navy in October 1942 but was recalled to service a year later, and survived the war.)

At 04:50 on 5 June, Yamamoto ordered Akagi scuttled, saying to his staff, "I was once the captain of Akagi, and it is with heartfelt regret that I must now order that she be sunk." Destroyers Arashi, Hagikaze, Maikaze, and Nowaki each fired one torpedo into the carrier and she sank, bow first, at 05:20 at 30°30′N 178°40′W. Two hundred and sixty-seven men of the ship's crew were lost, the fewest of any of the Japanese fleet carriers lost in the battle. (Note: Of the ship's fatalities, 115 were engineers, giving that department a 36 per cent casualty rate (the ship had 303 total personnel assigned to engineering), the highest on the carrier. Seven of the carrier's aircrew members were killed, also the fewest of any of the four fleet carriers lost in the battle. Other crewmembers killed included 72 seamen, 68 mechanics, one maintenance man, and five clerks. After returning to Japan, some of the carrier's injured survivors were quarantined in hospitals for almost a year.) The loss of Akagi and the three other IJN carriers at Midway, comprising two thirds of Japan's total number of fleet carriers and the experienced core of the First Air Fleet, was a crucial strategic defeat for Japan and contributed significantly to Japan's ultimate defeat in the war. In an effort to conceal the defeat, Akagi was not immediately removed from the Navy's registry of ships, instead being listed as "unmanned" before finally being struck from the registry on 25 September 1942.

== Wreck survey ==
On 20 October 2019, the Director of Undersea Operations for Vulcan Inc. Rob Kraft and Naval History and Heritage Command historian Frank Thompson aboard RV Petrel identified the wreck of Akagi using high-frequency sonar. Located 1,300 miles (2,100 km) north west of Pearl Harbor, Akagi was found at a depth of 18,011 feet (5,490 m). It is reported that the wreck is upright, on its keel and is largely intact. Two days before the discovery of Akagi, Petrel had discovered the wreck of Kaga.

The wreck of Akagi was visited and photographed by the research vessel EV Nautilus in September 2023. The survey confirmed that the ship was largely intact despite large amounts of damage to the hull, superstructure and flight deck.
