= Taijiro Aoki =

Imperial Japanese Navy officer (died 1962)

Taijirō Aoki
- 青木 泰二郎
- Died: November 23, 1962
- Education: Imperial Japanese Naval Academy
- Military career
- Allegiance: Empire of Japan
- Branch: Imperial Japanese Navy
- Service years: 1913–1945
- Rank: Captain
- Commands: Mizuho, Akagi

Taijiro Aoki (青木 泰二郎, Aoki Takijirō; died November 23, 1962) was a career officer in the Imperial Japanese Navy during World War II.

== Naval career ==
Aoki graduated from the 41st class of the Imperial Japanese Naval Academy at Etajima in December 1913, ranking 90 out of 118 Cadets. His classmates included Ryūnosuke Kusaka, Masatomi Kimura and Raizō Tanaka. Aoki was promoted to captain in 1937, and was made commander of the seaplane tender Mizuho. He subsequently served as commandant of the naval aviation training schools at Yokosuka and Tsuchiura.

On 25 April 1942, Aoki was made the captain of the aircraft carrier Akagi. He was in command of the ship at the time of her sinking at the Battle of Midway on 5 June 1942, and attempted to go down with his ship, but he was forcefully removed by his crew. After the battle, he applied to enter the reserves, but was instead sent to the garrison of Japanese-occupied Hainan, and made commander of the naval air group based at Haikou.

He was subsequently recalled to Japan to command the Sasebo Air Group. Aoki was in command of the Genzan Air Group in Korea at the time of the surrender of Japan. On hearing of the surrender announcement, Aoki flew back to the Japanese home islands; however, the men left behind in Wonsan were captured by the Soviet Union and were sent to labor camps in Siberia, where many perished. Aoki died in 1962.

== Assignments ==
- Gunnery Officer, Aoba – 30 November 1929 – 1 November 1930
- Equipping Officer, Takao – 1 November 1930 – 15 October 1931
- Gunnery Officer, Kaga – 15 October 1931 – 20 October 1933
- Executive Officer, Notoro – 20 October 1933 – 15 November 1934
- Executive Officer, Kisarazu Air Group – 1 April 1936 – 1 December 1936
- Executive Officer, Kaga – 1 December 1936 – 15 November 1937
- Commanding Officer, Kinugasa Maru – 15 November 1937 – 28 April 1938
- Chief Equipping Officer, Mizuho – 16 May 1938 – 25 February 1939
- Commanding Officer, Mizuho – 25 February 1939 – 15 November 1939
- Commanding Officer, Tsuchiura Air Group – 15 November 1940 – 25 April 1942
- Commanding Officer, Akagi – 25 April 1942 – 5 June 1942
- Staff Officer, Yokosuka Naval District – 25 July 1942 – 25 August 1942
- Staff Officer, Kure Naval District – 25 August 1942 – 5 October 1942
- Staff Officer, Yokosuka Naval District – 5 October 1942 – 1 November 1942
- Staff Officer, Hainan Guard District – 1 November 1942 – 1 October 1943
- Commanding Officer, Hainan Air Group – 1 October 1943 – 26 May 1944
- Commanding Officer, Haikou Air Group – 1 October 1943 – 1 May 1944 (additional duty while Commanding Officer Hainan Air Group)
- Commanding Officer, Oryu Air Group – 1 October 1943 – 1 May 1944 (additional duty while Commanding Officer Hainan Air Group)
- Commanding Officer, Sasebo Air Group – 15 May 1944 – 15 December 1944
- Commanding & Executive Officers, Genzan Air Group – 15 December 1944 – 15 August 1945

== Promotions ==
- Midshipman – 19 December 1913
- Ensign – 1 December 1914
- Sub-Lieutenant – 1 December 1916
- Lieutenant – 1 December 1920
- Lieutenant Commander – 1 December 1926
- Commander – 1 December 1932
- Captain – 1 December 1937
