= Midway (1976 film) =

1976 film by Jack Smight

- Theatrical release poster
- Directed by: Jack Smight
- Written by: Donald S. Sanford
- Produced by: Walter Mirisch
- Starring: Charlton Heston; Henry Fonda; James Coburn; Glenn Ford; Hal Holbrook; Toshiro Mifune; Robert Mitchum; Cliff Robertson; Robert Wagner; Robert Webber; Ed Nelson; James Shigeta; Christina Kokubo; Edward Albert
- Cinematography: Harry Stradling Jr.
- Edited by: Robert Swink; Frank J. Urioste
- Music by: John Williams
- Production company: The Mirisch Corporation
- Distributed by: Universal Pictures
- Release date: June 18, 1976 (U.S.)
- Running time: 131 minutes
- Country: United States
- Language: English
- Budget: $4 million
- Box office: $100 million

Midway (released in the United Kingdom as Battle of Midway) is a 1976 American war film that chronicles the Battle of Midway, a turning point in the Pacific War of World War II. It was directed by Jack Smight from a screenplay by Donald S. Sanford, and produced by Walter Mirisch.

Charlton Heston, Henry Fonda, and Toshiro Mifune lead a large ensemble cast, which also features Edward Albert, James Coburn, Glenn Ford, Ed Nelson, Hal Holbrook, Robert Webber, Robert Mitchum, Cliff Robertson, Robert Wagner, James Shigeta, Pat Morita, Dabney Coleman, Erik Estrada, and Tom Selleck in an early role. The film was made using Technicolor, and its soundtrack used Sensurround to augment the physical sensation of engine noise, explosions, crashes and gunfire.

Midway was released by Universal Pictures on June 18, 1976. Despite mixed reviews, particularly involving the use of stock footage and an unnecessary romance subplot, the music score by John Williams and the cinematography by Harry Stradling Jr. were highly regarded; as evidenced when Midway became the 10th-most popular movie at the box office in 1976.

== Plot ==
On April 18, 1942, a daring and unexpected bomb raid on Tokyo stuns the Japanese. The commander of the Imperial Japanese Navy, Admiral Yamamoto, uses the threat posed to the Japanese home islands by the American Pacific Fleet to have his plan to invade Midway Island approved. At Pearl Harbor, Captain Matt Garth is tasked to gauge the progress of American intelligence gathering. Commander Joseph Rochefort's staff, partially able to read Japanese Navy communications, learn their next target is code-named "AF". Yamamoto plans the Midway attack, with Admirals Nagumo and Yamaguchi leading the Japanese carrier forces and Admiral Kondo the amphibious invasion force.

In a sub-plot Garth is asked by his son, naval aviator Ensign Tom Garth, to help free his American-born girlfriend Haruko Sakura from internment. Garth calls in favors to accomplish it, but damages his relationship with his son by talking to Tom's commander, who transfers him out of his squadron.

After the inconclusive Battle of the Coral Sea, Rochefort uses a simple ruse to confirm that "AF" is Midway. Admiral Nimitz orders the carriers USS Enterprise and USS Hornet, augmented by USS Yorktown, hastily repaired after being damaged at Coral Sea, to a point north of Midway code-named "Point Luck" and lie in wait.

On June 4, the American carriers launch their planes when scouts detect the enemy fleet. Nagumo's carrier planes, unaware of the presence of US carriers, attack Midway Island, damaging installations but leaving the airstrip usable. Nagumo orders his planes rearmed with bombs to attack the airfield again, but when a scout reports the presence of Yorktown he orders the bombs changed for anti-ship torpedoes. American torpedo bombers desperately attack without fighter protection and are destroyed by the Japanese Combat Air Patrol, leaving only a single survivor, George H. Gay Jr. When American escort fighters cover another wave of torpedo bombers, Tom is wounded and severely burned. The Japanese fighters have been drawn down to low altitude by the torpedo planes when American dive-bombers from Enterprise and Yorktown find the Japanese fleet following the lucky hunch of a squadron commander. As the Japanese prepare to launch their second wave, the American bombers, unopposed by Japanese fighters far below them, reduce three of the Japanese carriers —Kaga, Sōryū, and Akagi—to burning wrecks.

Aircraft from the remaining Japanese carrier Hiryū follow the returning American bombers and severely damage Yorktown. Below decks, Matt reconciles with the wounded Tom. Due to a shortage of pilots, Matt joins the counterstrike against Hiryū but its planes have already launched. Yorktown is crippled and abandoned and Hiryū reduced to a burning wreck. Yamamoto orders a withdrawal. Matt is killed crashing his badly damaged plane on Enterprise. At Pearl Harbor, Haruko watches Tom carried off the ship and Nimitz and Rochefort reflect on the battle. Nimitz suggests Matt would have concluded Yamamoto "had everything going for him", and asked "were we better than the Japanese, or just luckier?". Spruance and Browning appear, Nimitz gives a firm salute to them.

== Cast ==
Characters listed in descending order by rank.

=== American ===
Actor	Role	Notes
Henry Fonda	Admiral Chester W. Nimitz	Commander, U.S. Pacific Fleet and of the Allied Pacific Ocean Areas; *Henry Fonda was one of the narrators of the 1942 John Ford documentary The Battle of Midway, some footage from which was used in the 1976 film, and had played an unnamed admiral (based on Admiral Nimitz) in the 1965 film In Harm's Way.
Robert Mitchum	Vice Admiral William F. Halsey	Halsey was the hospitalized commander of Task Force 16, with Spruance assigned command during the battle
Glenn Ford	Rear Admiral Raymond A. Spruance	Commander of Task Force 16, aboard USS Enterprise as his flagship
Robert Webber	Rear Admiral Frank J. Fletcher	Fletcher was commander of Task Force 17, aboard USS Yorktown as his flagship
Ed Nelson	Commodore Harry Pearson	A fictional composite character.
Charlton Heston	Captain Matthew Garth	Garth is a composite character largely absorbing the historical roles of Nimitz's staff officer Lieutenant Commander Edwin Layton as well as the less well known CAG of USS Yorktown Lieutenant Commander Oscar Pederson.
James Coburn	Captain Vinton Maddox	A fictional composite character.
Biff McGuire	Captain Miles Browning	Chief of Staff to Spruance aboard USS Enterprise, flagship of Spruance's Task Force 16
Gregory Walcott	Captain Elliott Buckmaster	Commanding officer of USS Yorktown, flagship of Fletcher's Task Force 17
Larry Pennell	Captain Cyril Simard	Commander of Naval Air Facility Midway Island.
Hal Holbrook	Commander Joseph Rochefort	Commander of the cryptographic intelligence unit Station HYPO at Pearl Harbor
Cliff Robertson	Commander Carl Jessop	A fictional composite character.
Dabney Coleman	Commander Murray Arnold	A fictional composite character.
Kurt Grayson	Major Floyd "Red" Parks	Commander of Marine Fighting Squadron 221 on NAS Midway Islands
Robert Wagner	Lieutenant Commander Ernest L. Blake	A fictional composite character.
Monte Markham	Lieutenant Commander Max Leslie	Commander of Bomber Squadron 3 aboard USS Yorktown
Christopher George	Lieutenant Commander C. Wade McClusky	Overall commander of the Enterprise Air Group aboard USS Enterprise, and flew as commander of its Bomber Squadron 6 during the battle
Glenn Corbett	Lieutenant Commander John C. Waldron	Commander of Torpedo Squadron 8 aboard USS Hornet
Clint Ritchie	Lieutenant Commander Charles R. Fenton	Uncredited; Commander of Squadron 42, USS Yorktown
Phillip R. Allen	Lieutenant Commander John S. "Jimmy" Thach	Commander of Fighting Squadron 3 aboard USS Yorktown
Steve Kanaly	Lieutenant Commander Lance E. Massey	Massey was commander of Torpedo Squadron 3 aboard USS Yorktown
Kip Niven	Lieutenant Howard P. Ady	PBY pilot
Kevin Dobson	Ensign George H. Gay Jr.	Naval aviator and sole survivor of the 30 men of Torpedo Squadron 8 during the battle
Edward Albert	Ensign Thomas Garth	Capt. Matthew Garth's son, a pilot aboard the USS Yorktown. Likewise a fictional character.
Erik Estrada	Ensign Ramos "Chili Bean"	A fictional composite character.
Alfie Wise	Chief Radioman Horace F. Dobbs	
Beeson Carroll	Radioman William E. Gallagher	
John Bennett Perry	Radioman Walter G. Chocholousek	
Redmond Gleeson	Pvt. Dombrowski	Uncredited; Radio operator, Naval Air Facility Midway Island.
Tom Selleck	Aide to Capt. Simard	

=== Japanese ===
Actor	Role	Notes
Toshiro Mifune	Admiral Isoroku Yamamoto	Voiced by uncredited actor Paul Frees; Overall commander of the Imperial Japanese Navy's Combined Fleet, and the 1st Fleet Main Group, enhanced as the Main Force, aboard Yamato as his flagship
James Shigeta	Vice Admiral Chūichi Nagumo	Commander of the 1st Air Fleet, enhanced as the First Carrier Striking Force, and the 1st Carrier Division, aboard Akagi as his flagship
Dale Ishimoto	Vice Admiral Boshirō Hosogaya	Commander of the 5th Fleet, enhanced as the Northern Area Force, aboard Nachi as his flagship, strategically launching the invasion of the Aleutian Islands coincident with the Battle of Midway
Conrad Yama	Vice Admiral Nobutake Kondō	Commander of the 2nd Fleet, enhanced as the (intended) Midway Occupation Force and Covering Group, aboard Atago as his flagship
Pat Morita	Rear Admiral Ryūnosuke Kusaka	Chief of Staff to Nagumo aboard Akagi, flagship of Nagumo's 1st Air Fleet and 1st Carrier Division
John Fujioka	Rear Admiral Tamon Yamaguchi	Commander of the 2nd Carrier Division, aboard Hiryū as his flagship
Lloyd Kino	Captain Takijirō Aoki	Uncredited; Commander of Akagi, Nagumo's flagship
Yuki Shimoda	Captain Tomeo Kaku	Uncredited; Commander of Hiryū, Yamaguchi's flagship
Seth Sakai	Captain Kameto Kuroshima	Yamamoto's staff officer.
Robert Ito	Commander Minoru Genda	Genda was a staff officer of the 1st Air Fleet, reporting to Nagumo aboard Akagi
Clyde Kusatsu	Commander Yasuji Watanabe	Yamamoto's staff officer.
Richard Narita	Lieutenant Hashimoto	Uncredited; Staff officer of the 1st Air Fleet, reporting to Nagumo aboard Akagi
Sab Shimono	Lieutenant Jōichi Tomonaga	Staff officer of the 1st Air Fleet, reporting to Yamaguchi aboard Hiryū

=== Civilians ===
Actor	Role	Notes
Christina Kokubo	Haruko Sakura	

== Production ==
=== Development ===
John Guillermin was reportedly hired to direct but was replaced by Jack Smight before filming began. Naval aviator Lieutenant Richard "Dick" Best and Joseph Rochefort served as consultants; George Gay, the only survivor of Torpedo Squadron 8, visited during filming. Toshiro Mifune sent his script to Minoru Genda and to Yamamoto's son, so that they could attest to its historical accuracy. Reportedly, Mifune had been scheduled to play Yamamoto in Tora! Tora! Tora! (1970), but withdrew when director Akira Kurosawa left the project. The filmmakers wanted to portray the Japanese in a fair light and to portray them and the Americans as equals. Principal photography was scheduled to end around 20 July 1975. Filming at sea took three weeks, which included shooting on the USS Lexington, the last World War II ship in service. Robert Mitchum settled on filming his scenes in bed. Modern crew members of the Lexington were persuaded to have their hair cut and to shave to conform to World War II Navy regulations after watching the filming. Fonda was astonished to learn that Yamamoto and Nimitz were missing fingers from accidents. Fonda consciously folded back his finger throughout his performance and Mifune had his uniforms and gloves made to be accurate as possible. In the original script, Garth survived.

=== Filming ===
Cast members pose with a Grumman F4F Wildcat fighter on the flight deck of USS Lexington

Midway was shot at the Terminal Island Naval Base, Los Angeles, California, the U.S. Naval Station, Long Beach, California, Naval Air Station Pensacola, Florida and San Diego, California. The on-board scenes were filmed in the Gulf of Mexico aboard USS Lexington, an Essex-class aircraft carrier that had been under construction during the battle and was the last World War II-era carrier still in service at the time of filming. She is now a museum ship at Corpus Christi, Texas. Scenes depicting Midway Island were filmed at Point Mugu, California. "Point Mugu has sand dunes, just like Midway. We built an airstrip, a tower, some barricades, things like that," said Jack Smight. "We did a lot of strafing and bombing there." A Consolidated PBY-6A Catalina BuNo 63998, N16KL, of the Commemorative Air Force, was used in depicting all the search and rescue mission scenes.

=== Sound ===
The film was the second of only four films released with a Sensurround sound mix which required special speakers to be installed in movie theatres. The other Sensurround films were Earthquake (1974), Rollercoaster (1977), and Battlestar Galactica (1978). The regular soundtrack (dialog, background and music) was monaural; a second optical track was devoted to low frequency rumble added to battle scenes and when characters were near unmuffled military engines.

=== Action ===
Japanese carrier hit by US bombs (for this scene, Midway editors used stock footage from the Japanese movie Storm Over the Pacific (太平洋の嵐 Taiheiyo no arashi), 1960).

Many of the action sequences used footage from earlier films: most sequences of the Japanese air raids on Midway are stock shots from 20th Century Fox's Tora! Tora! Tora! (1970). Some scenes are from the Japanese Toho film Hawai Middouei daikaikusen: Taiheiyo no arashi (1960) (which also stars Mifune). Several action scenes, including the one where a Mitsubishi A6M Zero slams into Yorktown's bridge, were taken from Away All Boats (1956); scenes of Doolittle's Tokyo raid at the beginning of the film are from Thirty Seconds Over Tokyo (1944). In addition, most dogfight sequences come from wartime gun camera footage or from the film Battle of Britain (1969).

The US Navy Essex-class aircraft carrier USS Lexington played the part of both American and Japanese flattops for shipboard scenes.

=== Television version ===
Shortly after its successful theatrical debut, additional material was assembled and shot in standard 4:3 ratio for a TV version of the film, which aired on NBC. The TV version was 45 minutes longer than the theatrical film and aired over two nights. In the TV version of the film, Susan Sullivan played Ann, the girlfriend of Captain Garth, to add depth to his reason for previously divorcing Ensign Garth's mother, and restored a cut scene from the theatrical release that clarifies that Garth suffered a hand injury in the Pearl Harbor attack that has kept him out of flying, to bring further emotional impact to the fate of Captain Garth. Ann is seen in the final scene as Hornet docks at Pearl Harbor.

The TV version also added Coral Sea battle scenes to help the plot build up to the decisive engagement at Midway. Mitchell Ryan played Rear Admiral Aubrey W. Fitch aboard the USS Lexington and Jim Ishida played Takeo Koda, a Japanese pilot and old friend of Nagumo. After the raid on Tokyo, Koda meets Nagumo to express his doubts that Japan might be able to win the war. Koda is killed in the Coral Sea battle, and Yamaguchi informs Nagumo about the defeat at Coral Sea. Prior to the Midway battle, the cautious Nagumo ruminates on Koda to Genda.

Jack Smight directed the additional scenes. The end credits of the TV version use the song, "The Men of the Yorktown March" (which is more prominent in the film's underscore), instead of the "Midway March".

In June 1992, a re-edit of the extended version, shortened to fill a three-hour time slot, aired on the CBS network to commemorate the 50th anniversary of the Midway battle. This version brought in successful ratings.

Later video versions dropped Sullivan to emphasize the virtually all-male cast and wartime action. The additional footage with Sullivan became available as a bonus feature on the Universal Pictures Home Entertainment DVD of Midway. The full version was given a dual-format release by Powerhouse Films in 2021.

== Reception ==
=== Box office ===
Midway was a major financial success and opened at number one at the US box office with an opening weekend gross of $4,356,666 from 311 theatres. It went on to gross over $43 million at the US box office, becoming the tenth most popular movie of 1976 with theatrical rentals of $20,300,000. Internationally, it grossed $57 million for a worldwide gross of $100 million.

=== Critical response ===
Roger Ebert of the Chicago Sun-Times gave the film two-and-a-half stars out of four and wrote, "The movie can be experienced as pure spectacle, I suppose, if we give up all hopes of making sense of it. Bombs explode and planes crash and the theater shakes with the magic of Sensurround. But there's no real directorial intelligence at hand to weave the special effects into the story, to clarify the outlines of the battle and to convincingly account for the unexpected American victory." Vincent Canby of The New York Times wrote that "the movie blows up harmlessly in a confusion of familiar old newsreel footage, idiotic fiction war movie clichés, and a series of wooden-faced performances by almost a dozen male stars, some of whom appear so briefly that it's like taking a World War II aircraft-identification test." Arthur D. Murphy of Variety thought that the film "emerges more as a passingly exciting theme-park extravaganza than a quality motion picture action-adventure story ... Donald S. Sanford's cluttered script, while striving for the long-ago personal element, gets overwhelmed by its action effects." Gene Siskel of the Chicago Tribune gave the film two-and-a-half stars out of four and wrote that "[t]he battle scenes run hot and cold." He praised Henry Fonda as "absolutely convincing" but stated that Sanford "deserves a year in the brig for inserting amid the battle scenes a stupid subplot involving a young American sailor in love with a Japanese-American girl." Gary Arnold of The Washington Post called it a "tired combat epic" and wrote, "Hollywood may mean well, or imagine it does, but it's a little appalling to think that authentic acts of bravery and sacrifice have become the pretext for such feeble, inadequate dramatization. There is no serious attempt in 'Midway' to characterize the young men who fought on either side of this pivotal battle." Charles Champlin of the Los Angeles Times was mixed, describing it as "a disaster film whose disaster is war," with its principal strength being that it "keeps the lines of battle both straight and suspenseful in the viewer's mind." He too faulted the romance subplot as "hokey even beyond the demands of the form." Janet Maslin panned the film in Newsweek, stating that it "never quite decides whether war is hell, good clean fun, or merely another existential dilemma. This drab extravaganza toys with so many conflicting attitudes that it winds up reducing the pivotal World War II battle in the Pacific to utter nonsense."

Robert Niemi, author of History in the Media: Film and Television, stated that Midway's "clichéd dialogue" and an overuse of stock footage led the film to have a "shopworn quality that signalled the end of the heroic era of American-made World War II epics." He described the film as a "final, anachronistic attempt to recapture World War II glories in a radically altered geopolitical era, when the old good-versus-evil dichotomies no longer made sense."

On review aggregator website Rotten Tomatoes, the film has a 39% score based on 18 reviews, with an average rating of 5.8/10.

== Historical accuracy ==
More flag officers took part at the decision making and planning before the battle, not just Nimitz, Fletcher and Spruance. In addition, the commanding officers' staff were generally bigger than the one or two men portrayed in the movie. Admiral Ernest King, commander-in-chief of the navy, approved the Midway battle plan propounded by Nimitz. The two commanders were regularly in contact, so there was no need to send fictional Capt. Vinton Maddox to consult Nimitz. The failure of Midway-based aircraft attacks on approaching Japanese fleets convinced Japanese commanders of their own invincibility and the incompetence of the US military.

During the American torpedo attacks, Admiral Nagumo remarks, "They sacrifice themselves like samurai, these Americans." Similar to Isoroku Yamamoto's sleeping giant quote from the 1970 film Tora! Tora! Tora!, there is no evidence that Nagumo made this statement. When the Akagi is bombed, Nagumo suffers a concussion, and is tended to by Genda. In reality, according to witnesses, Nagumo stood near the ship's compass looking out at the destruction.

The film omits that the Japanese destroyer Arashi that inadvertently guided US dive bombers to the carriers had attacked U.S. submarine Nautilus, which had tried to attack the battleship Kirishima.

Later studies by Japanese and American military historians call into question key scenes, such as the dive-bombing attack that crippled the first three Japanese carriers. In the movie, American pilots jubilantly report that there are no fighters and the carrier decks are loaded with ammunition. As Jonathan Parshall and Anthony Tully write in Shattered Sword: The Untold Story of the Battle of Midway (2005), aerial photography from the battle showed nearly empty decks. Japanese carriers loaded armament onto planes below the flight deck, unlike American carriers (as depicted earlier in the film). The fact that a closed hangar full of armaments was hit by bombs made damage to Akagi more devastating than if planes, torpedoes and bombs were on an open deck. During the attack on the Japanese carriers, an American pilot reports, "Scratch one flat top!" This is a famous radio transmission but it was made a month earlier during the Battle of the Coral Sea by Lieutenant Commander Robert E. Dixon after his dive bomber squadron sank the Japanese aircraft carrier Shōhō.

While most characters are based on real people, some are fictional but inspired by actual people. Captain Matt Garth and his son, Ensign Thomas Garth, are fictional. Garth's contribution to planning the battle is based loosely on actual work of Lieutenant-Commander Edwin Layton. Layton served as Pacific fleet intelligence officer, spoke Japanese and was key to transposing raw outputs of cryptography analysis into meaningful intelligence for Nimitz and his staff. Layton was an old friend of Joseph Rochefort. Matt Garth's further exploits were pure fiction and resembled deeds of at least two more figures: first, an intelligence officer on Fletcher's Task Force 17 staff, and then the leader of the last attack made by dive bombers from USS Yorktown, by the VB-3 dive bomber squadron led by LCDR Maxwell Leslie.

There are numerous inaccuracies both in the use of historical combat footage and recreations. Most of the original footage portrays later and/or different events, and thus planes and ships that either were not operational during the battle or did not take part. Among the first aircraft shown taking off to defend Midway are two Army P-40 Warhawks: only Marine F4F Wildcats and F2A-3 Buffalos had been stationed there. In the second air attack on Yorktown, the movie shows two Japanese "kamikazes" crashing into the aircraft carrier; there were no plane crashes into ships in this battle. In addition, Yorktown was damaged and sunk by torpedoes fired from a Japanese submarine which had penetrated the destroyer screen, rather than survived the air attack seen in the film. A nearby destroyer, USS Hammann, also was attacked, sending more than 100 men into the sea and sinking in just four minutes. One of the most flagrant misrepresentations is Garth's collision at the very end of the movie, which is followed by footage of a Grumman F9F Panther jet plane crash which actually occurred on USS Midway in 1951.

Like the USS Lexington used in filming, USS Midway is also preserved as a museum.

== See also ==
- List of historical drama films
- List of historical drama films of Asia
- Midway (2019 film)
