= Mitsuo Fuchida =

Imperial Japanese Navy captain (1902–1976)

- 淵田 美津雄
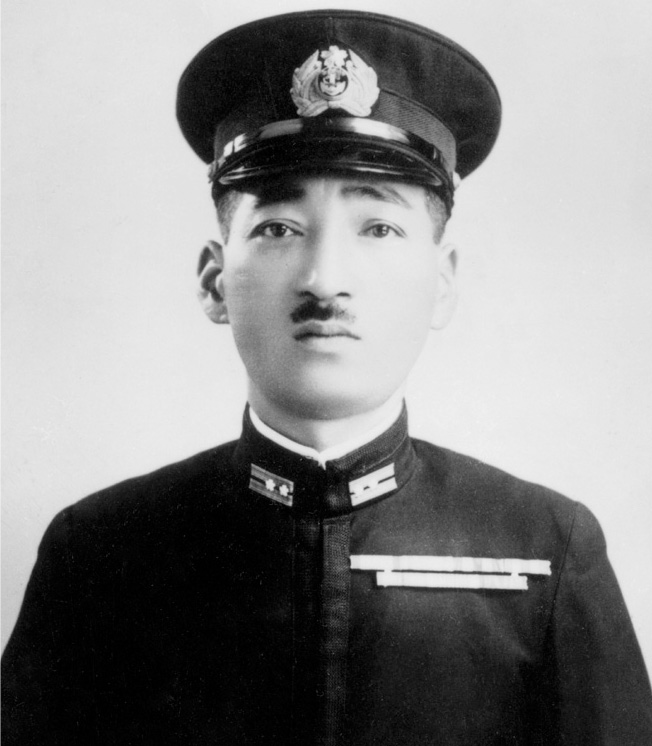
- Born: 3 December 1902; Katsuragi, Nara, Japan
- Died: 30 May 1976 (aged 73); Kashiwara, Osaka, Japan
- Education: Imperial Japanese Naval Academy; Naval Staff College
- Military career
- Allegiance: Empire of Japan
- Branch: Imperial Japanese Navy
- Service years: 1924–1945
- Rank: Captain
- Units: Kaga, Sasebo Air Group, 1st Air Fleet, Combined Fleet
- Commands: Akagi: 1st (flag), 2nd and 3rd air squadrons
- Conflicts: Second Sino-Japanese War; World War II; Attack on Pearl Harbor; Bombing of Darwin; Indian Ocean raid; Battle of Midway (WIA)
- Other work: Christian evangelist, author

Mitsuo Fuchida (淵田 美津雄, Fuchida Mitsuo; 3 December 1902 – 30 May 1976) was a captain in the Imperial Japanese Navy Air Service and a bomber observer in the Imperial Japanese Navy before and during World War II. He is best known for leading the first wave of air attacks on Pearl Harbor on 7 December 1941, coordinating the aerial attack under fleet commander, vice admiral Chūichi Nagumo.

After the war, Fuchida became a Christian convert and evangelist, traveling to the United States and Europe to tell his story. He later settled in the U.S. (although never taking American citizenship). Some of Fuchida's wartime claims have been challenged as self-serving by historians, including his claimed advocacy for a third wave attack on Pearl Harbor.

== Early life and education ==
Fuchida was born on 3 December 1902 in what is now part of Katsuragi, Nara Prefecture, Japan, to Yazo and Shika Fuchida. In 1921, he entered the Imperial Japanese Naval Academy at Etajima, Hiroshima, where he befriended classmate Minoru Genda and discovered an interest in flying. Specializing in horizontal bombing, Fuchida was made an instructor in that technique in 1936. He gained combat experience during the Second Sino-Japanese War, when he was assigned to the aircraft carrier Kaga in 1929 and later to the Sasebo Air Group. He was promoted to lieutenant commander on 1 December 1936 and was accepted into the Naval Staff College. Fuchida joined the aircraft carrier Akagi in 1939 as the commander of the air group. Fuchida was made commander in October 1941.

== World War II ==
=== Pearl Harbor ===
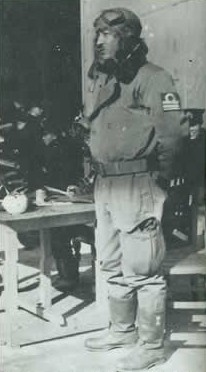
Fuchida in training for the attack on Pearl Harbor

On Sunday, 7 December 1941, a Japanese force under the command of Vice Admiral Chūichi Nagumo—consisting of six carriers with 423 aircraft—was ready to attack the United States base at Pearl Harbor, Hawaii. At 06:00, the first wave of 183 dive bombers, torpedo bombers, horizontal bombers and fighters took off from carriers 250 mi (400 km) north of Oahu and headed for the U.S. Pacific Fleet at Pearl Harbor.

At 07:40 Hawaiian Standard Time, Mitsuo Fuchida, who by this time had achieved the rank of commander, arrived with the first attack wave on Oahu's north shore near Kahuku Point. The first attack wave then banked west and flew along the northwest coast. Fuchida ordered "Tenkai" (Take attack position), and upon seeing no U.S. activity at Pearl Harbor, Fuchida slid back the canopy of his Nakajima B5N2 torpedo bomber, tailcode AI-301 and fired a dark blue flare known as a "black dragon", the signal to attack.

Passing Waimea Bay at 07:49, Fuchida instructed his radio operator, Petty Officer 1st Class Norinobu Mizuki, to send the coded signal "To, To, To" (totsugekiseyo—"to charge") to the other aircraft. Fuchida, thinking Lt Cmdr Shigeru Itaya's Zeroes had missed the signal, fired a second flare. Lt Cmdr Kakuichi Takahashi, overall leader of the first wave dive bombers, saw both flares and misunderstood the signal. Thinking the dive bombers were to attack, he led his dive bombers into immediate attack position. Lt Cmdr Shigeharu Murata, overall leader of the torpedo bombers, observed both flares and saw Takahashi's planes gliding into attack formation. He knew there was a misunderstanding which could not be rectified, so he led his torpedo bombers into attack positions. At this point, Cmdr Fuchida's pilot, Lieutenant Mitsuo Matsuzaki, guided their bomber along with the remaining horizontal bombers in a formation sweep around Kaena Point and headed down the western coast of Oahu.

At 07:53, Fuchida ordered Mizuki to send the code words "Tora! Tora! Tora!" back to the carrier Akagi, the flagship of 1st Air Fleet. (Note: (虎 tora is Japanese for "tiger" but in this case "To" is the initial syllable of the Japanese word 突撃 totsugeki meaning "charge" or "attack" and "ra" is the initial syllable of 雷撃 raigeki meaning "torpedo attack".) The message meant that complete surprise had been achieved. Due to favorable atmospheric conditions, the transmission of the "Tora! Tora! Tora!" code words from the moderately powered transmitter were heard over a ship's radio in Japan by Admiral Isoroku Yamamoto, the naval commander, and his staff, who were sitting up through the night awaiting word on the attack.

As the first wave returned to the carriers, Fuchida remained over the target to assess damage and observe the second-wave attack. He returned to his carrier only after the second wave had completed its mission. With great pride, he announced that the U.S. battleship fleet had been destroyed. Fuchida inspected his craft and found 21 large flak holes: the main control wires were barely holding together. The successful attack made Fuchida a national hero who was granted a personal audience with Emperor Hirohito.

=== Other actions ===
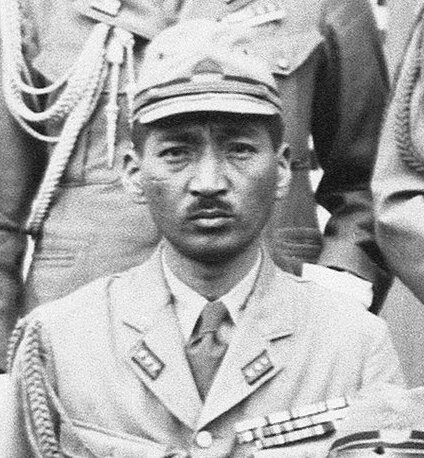
Fuchida as a staff officer of the Combined Fleet, August 1945

On 19 February 1942, Fuchida led the first of two waves of 188 aircraft in a devastating air raid on Darwin, Australia. On 5 April, he led another series of air attacks by carrier-based Japanese aircraft against Royal Navy bases in Ceylon, which was the headquarters of the British Eastern Fleet, in what Winston Churchill described as "the most dangerous moment" of World War II.

On 4 June 1942, while on board Akagi, Fuchida was wounded at the Battle of Midway. Unable to fly while recovering from an emergency shipboard appendectomy a few days before the battle, he was on the ship's bridge during the morning attacks by U.S. aircraft. After Akagi was hit, a chain reaction from burning fuel and live bombs began the destruction of the ship. When flames blocked the exit from the bridge, the officers evacuated down a rope, and as Fuchida slid down, an explosion threw him to the deck and broke both his ankles.

=== Staff officer ===
After spending several months recuperating, Fuchida spent the rest of the war in Japan as a staff officer. On 15 October 1944, he was promoted to captain. The day before the first nuclear weapon was dropped on Hiroshima, he was in the city to attend a week-long military conference with Imperial Japanese Army officers. Fuchida received a long-distance phone call from the Navy Headquarters asking him to return to Tokyo. The day after the bombing, he returned to Hiroshima with a party sent to assess the damage. Many members of Fuchida's party later died of radiation poisoning, but Fuchida exhibited no symptoms. Fuchida's military career ended with his demobilization in November 1945 during the American-led occupation of Japan.

== Postwar activities ==
After the war, Fuchida was called on to testify at the trials of some of the Japanese military for Japanese war crimes. This infuriated him, as he believed this was little more than "victors' justice". In the spring of 1947, convinced that the U.S. had treated the Japanese the same way and determined to bring that evidence to the next trial, Fuchida went to Uraga Harbor near Yokosuka to meet a group of returning Japanese prisoners of war. He was surprised to find his former flight engineer, Kazuo Kanegasaki, who all had believed had died in the Battle of Midway. When questioned, Kanegasaki told Fuchida that they were not tortured or abused, much to Fuchida's surprise. He then went on to tell him of a young lady, Peggy Covell, who served them with the deepest love and respect, but whose missionary parents had been killed by Japanese soldiers on the island of Panay in the Philippines.

For Fuchida, this was inexplicable, as in the Bushido code revenge was not only permitted, it was "a responsibility" for an offended party to carry out revenge to restore honor. The murderer of one's parents would be a sworn enemy for life. He became almost obsessed trying to understand why anyone would treat their enemies with love and forgiveness.

In the fall of 1948, Fuchida was passing by the bronze statue of Hachikō at the Shibuya Station when he was handed a pamphlet about the life of Jacob DeShazer, a member of the Doolittle Raid who was captured by the Japanese after his B-25 bomber ran out of fuel over occupied China. In the pamphlet, "I Was a Prisoner of Japan" DeShazer, a former U.S. Army Air Forces staff sergeant and bombardier, told his story of imprisonment, torture and his account of an "awakening to God." This experience increased Fuchida's curiosity of the Christian faith. In September 1949, after reading the Bible for himself, he became a Christian. In May 1950, Fuchida and DeShazer met for the first time. Fuchida created the Captain Fuchida Evangelistical Association based in Seattle, Washington and spoke full-time of his conversion to the Christian faith in presentations titled "From Pearl Harbor To Calvary".

In 1951, Fuchida, along with a colleague, published an account of the Battle of Midway from the Japanese side. In 1952, he toured the United States as a member of the Worldwide Christian Missionary Army of Sky Pilots. Fuchida remained dedicated to a similar initiative as the group for the remainder of his life.

In February 1954, Reader's Digest published Fuchida's story of the attack on Pearl Harbor. Fuchida also wrote and co-wrote books, including From Pearl Harbor to Golgotha, a.k.a. From Pearl Harbor to Calvary, and a 1955 expansion of his 1951 book Midway, a.k.a. Midway: The Battle that Doomed Japan, the Japanese Navy's Story. His autobiography, titled "Shinjuwan Kogeki no Sotaicho no Kaiso", was published in Japan in 2007. This was translated into English by Douglas Shinsato and Tadanori Urabe and published in 2011 under the title, "For That One Day: The Memoirs of Mitsuo Fuchida, Commander of the Attack on Pearl Harbor". Fuchida's story is also recounted in God's Samurai: Lead Pilot at Pearl Harbor by Donald Goldstein, Katherine V. Dillon and Gordon W. Prange.

In 1959, Fuchida was among a group of Japanese visiting the tour of U.S. Air Force equipment given by General Paul Tibbets, who piloted the Enola Gay that dropped the atomic bomb on Hiroshima. Fuchida recognized Tibbets and had a conversation with him. Tibbets said to Fuchida that "[y]ou sure did surprise us [at Pearl Harbor]" in which he replied "what do you think you did to us [at Hiroshima]?" Fuchida further told him that:

You did the right thing. You know the Japanese attitude at that time, how fanatic they were, they'd die for the Emperor ... Every man, woman, and child would have resisted that invasion with sticks and stones if necessary ... Can you imagine what a slaughter it would be to invade Japan? It would have been terrible. The Japanese people know more about that than the American public will ever know.

According to Fuchida's son, his father had a green card allowing permanent residence in the U.S. but he never obtained U.S. citizenship. This is contrary to the assertions of several authors. Fuchida died of complications caused by diabetes in Kashiwara, near Osaka on 30 May 1976 at the age of 73.

== Published works ==
Fuchida was the author of three books: one on the Battle of Midway, one a memoir, and one on his conversion to Christianity.

- Midway: The Battle that Doomed Japan, the Japanese Navy's Story (Naval Institute Press, 2000) was coauthored with Masatake Okumiya. In a section entitled "Five Fateful Minutes", Fuchida (as translated) writes "Five minutes! Who would have believed that the tide of battle would shift in that brief interval of time? ... We had been caught flatfooted in the most vulnerable condition possible—decks loaded with planes armed and fueled for attack." Later scholarship (Parshall et al.) dispute Fuchida's description. (Edited by Clarke H. Kawakami and Roger Pineau; ISBN 9781557504289)
- For That One Day: The Memoirs of Mitsuo Fuchida, the Commander of the Attack on Pearl Harbor (eXperience, Incorporated, 2011) was his memoir. In it, Fuchida makes a claim that has not been corroborated by others: "In my role as Staff of General Navy Headquarters, I was assigned miscellaneous tasks to help the Japanese side's preparations. Since I was not an official attaché, I was watching the signing ceremony from the upper deck along with the crews of the USS Missouri." (Translated by Douglas T. Shinsato and Tadanori Urabe; ISBN 9780984674503)
- From Pearl Harbor to Calvary (Pickle Partners Publishing, March 28, 2016, ISBN 9781786259066), originally published as From Pearl Harbor to Golgotha, is the story of Fuchida's Christian conversion.

== Historical controversy ==
Fuchida was an important figure in the early portion of the Pacific War, and his written accounts, translated into English and published in the U.S., were highly influential. However, the veracity of Fuchida's statements on several topics has been subsequently called into question. This process began in Japan in 1971, with the publication of the Japanese official war history volume on the Battle of Midway, that explicitly contradicted Fuchida's version of events.

In 2001, historians H.P. Willmott and Haruo Tohmatsu in their Pearl Harbor, dismissed Fuchida's rendition of having demanded a third-wave against Pearl Harbor's fuel tanks as "blatant and shameless self-advertisement" regarding "an episode which never took place." These criticisms were repeated by historian Jonathan Parshall and Mark Stille's Tora! Tora! Tora! Pearl Harbor 1941. Alan Zimm's 2011 Attack on Pearl Harbor: Strategy, Combat, Myths, Deceptions, reinforced and enlarged these earlier criticisms and added new charges, including Fuchida having fabricated a battle damage assessment that was presented to Emperor Hirohito. Zimm subsequently accused Fuchida of lying about important decisions and signals he made as strike leader immediately prior to the attack, while blaming others for his own errors.

With respect to the Battle of Midway, Fuchida's account of the readiness of the Japanese counterstrike aircraft during the American dive-bomber attack has been disputed by historians Parshall and Anthony Tully in their 2005 work Shattered Sword, as well as Dallas Isom's Midway Inquest, Craig Symonds' The Battle of Midway, and Evan Mawdsley, with Mawdsley noting "Parshall and Tully compellingly contradict Fuchida." Parshall also disputed Fuchida's uncorroborated claims of attendance on the battleship USS Missouri during the Surrender of Japan in 1945, these criticisms being later amplified by Zimm.

== Portrayals ==
In the 1970 film Tora! Tora! Tora!, Fuchida was portrayed by Japanese actor Takahiro Tamura.

Gordon Prange wrote Fuchida's biography, titled God's Samurai: Lead Pilot at Pearl Harbor, in 1990.

== Auction ==
Fuchida's hand-drawn map showing the post-Pearl Harbor attack destruction sold at auction for $425,000 in New York City on 6 December 2013. The map had previously been owned by Malcolm Forbes.

The map was purchased by the Jay I. Kislak foundation, who then donated it to Miami-Dade Library. The library then sold it to the Library of Congress in 2018.
