= Japanese destroyer Kisaragi =

Two destroyers of the Imperial Japanese Navy were named Kisaragi:

- Japanese destroyer Kisaragi (1905), a Kamikaze-class destroyer launched in 1905 and scrapped in 1928
- Japanese destroyer Kisaragi (1925), a Mutsuki-class destroyer launched in 1925 and sunk in 1941
