= The Yakuza =

1974 film by Sydney Pollack

- Theatrical release poster
- Directed by: Sydney Pollack
- Screenplay by: Paul Schrader; Robert Towne
- Story by: Leonard Schrader
- Produced by: Sydney Pollack
- Starring: Robert Mitchum; Ken Takakura; Brian Keith; Herb Edelman; Richard Jordan; Keiko Kishi
- Cinematography: Kōzō Okazaki; Duke Callaghan
- Edited by: Thomas Stanford; Don Guidice; Fredric Steinkamp (sup.)
- Music by: Dave Grusin
- Production companies: Warner Bros.; Toei Company
- Distributed by: Warner Bros.
- Release dates: December 28, 1974 (Japan); March 19, 1975 (U.S.)
- Running time: 112 minutes
- Countries: United States; Japan
- Languages: English; Japanese
- Budget: $5 million
- Box office: ~$1.5 million

The Yakuza (Japanese: ザ・ヤクザ, Hepburn: Za yakuza) is a 1974 neo-noir crime drama film directed and produced by Sydney Pollack, and starring Robert Mitchum, Ken Takakura, Brian Keith and Keiko Kishi. The screenplay by Paul Schrader and Robert Towne is from a story by Schrader's brother, Leonard Schrader. The film is about a retired American detective (Mitchum) who returns to Japan after decades away in order to rescue his friend's daughter, kidnapped by the eponymous crime syndicate.

The film was a co-production between Warner Bros. and Japan's Toei Company, and was filmed principally on-location in Tokyo, Osaka, and Kyoto. It premiered in Japan on December 28, 1974, before going into general release in the United States on March 19, 1975. It received mixed reviews from critics and was a commercial disappointment, though in the ensuing decades it has developed a cult following, and has been praised by filmmakers like Quentin Tarantino.

== Plot ==
Retired detective Harry Kilmer is called upon by an old friend, George Tanner. Tanner has been doing business with a yakuza gangster, Tono, who has kidnapped Tanner's daughter Louise to apply pressure in a business deal involving the sale of guns. Tanner hopes that Kilmer can rescue the girl using his Japanese connections.

Kilmer and Tanner had been Marine MPs in Tokyo during the post-war occupation. Kilmer became aware of a woman, Eiko, who was involved in the black market to procure penicillin for her ailing daughter. Kilmer intervened on behalf of Eiko during a skirmish, saving her life. After some time living together, with Kilmer repeatedly asking Eiko to marry him, her brother Ken returned from an island where he was stranded as an Imperial Japanese soldier. Both outraged that she was living with his former enemy and deeply indebted to Kilmer for saving the lives of his (apparently) only remaining family, Ken disappeared into the yakuza criminal underground and refused to see or speak to his sister. Eiko, cautious not to do any moves to offend Ken further, broke off contact with Kilmer. Before returning to the US, Kilmer bought Eiko a bar (with money borrowed from George Tanner), which she still operates, named "Kilmer House" in his honor. Kilmer has never stopped loving her.

Ken's debt to Kilmer, giri, is a lifelong obligation that traditionally can never be repaid. Tanner believes that Ken would therefore do anything for Kilmer, including rescuing Louise. Traveling to Tokyo with Tanner's bodyguard, Dusty, they stay at the home of another old military buddy named Oliver Wheat. Kilmer visits Eiko at the bar's closing time, seeking to find Ken. Eiko's feelings for Kilmer are as strong as ever. He also becomes reacquainted with Eiko's daughter, Hanako, who is delighted to see Kilmer again. Eiko tells Kilmer that her brother can be found at his kendo school in Kyoto.

Kilmer travels by train to visit Ken at his kendo school. Ken is no longer a yakuza member, but will still help Kilmer. They find and free Louise. In so doing, Ken "takes up the sword" once again, attacking one of Tono's men to save Kilmer. This is an inexcusable intrusion by Ken in yakuza affairs. Contracts on both Ken's and Kilmer's lives are issued. Despite Tanner's protests, Kilmer insists on staying until the danger to Ken can be resolved. Eiko suggests he see Ken's brother Goro, a high-level legal counselor to the yakuza chiefs. Goro is unable to intercede due to his impartial role in yakuza society, but suggests Ken can remove the death threat by killing Tono with a sword. The only alternative is for Kilmer to kill Tono himself, by any means (as an outsider, he is not bound to use a sword). Because Kilmer is familiar to Goro as an unusual gaijin who understands and accepts Japanese values, he proposes that Kilmer now has an obligation to Ken.

After an attempt on Kilmer's life at a bathhouse, he learns that his old friend Tanner has taken out the contract on him. Tanner is secretly broke and owes Tono a huge debt. Dusty discloses that Tanner and Tono are business partners. During a violent attack on Ken and Kilmer in Oliver Wheat's house, Dusty is stabbed to death with a sword, and Hanako is shot and killed.

Seeking advice again from Ken's brother, Goro advises them that they have no choice but to assassinate Tanner and Tono. This will embarrass the partners in the eyes of the yakuza. Goro discloses that he has a "wayward son" who has joined Tono's clan and asks that Ken protect him should he be caught in the battle. In private, Goro then discloses the shocking family secret to Kilmer: Eiko is not Ken's sister, but his wife, and Hanako is their only child. Kilmer understands the true meaning of Eiko and Ken's rift, as well as Ken's anguish over the death of Hanako, all of which is brought about by his repeated intercessions in their lives.

Kilmer storms into Tanner's apartment and kills him, then joins Ken for a near-suicidal attack on Tono's residence. During a prolonged battle, after Ken traditionally kills Tono with a katana, Goro's son attacks them, and Ken kills him in self-defense. Bearing the news to his brother, Ken moves to commit seppuku, but his brother pleads with him not to bring more anguish to their family. Instead, Ken performs yubitsume (the ceremonial yakuza apology by cutting off one's little finger).

Before leaving Japan, Kilmer visits with Ken at home and asks to speak to him formally. While Ken prepares the tea, Kilmer quietly commits yubitsume, and when Ken enters the room, he waits for him to be seated. Sliding the folded handkerchief that contains his finger to Ken, he says, "Please accept this token of my apology" for "bringing great pain into your life, both in the past and in the present." Ken accepts, and Kilmer asks, "If you can forgive me, then you can forgive Eiko," adding, "You are greatly loved and respected by all your family." Ken professes that "no man has a greater friend than Kilmer-san," and Kilmer, overcome by emotion, says the same of Ken. Their obligations now apparently resolved, Ken takes Kilmer to the airport, and both men bow formally to each other before parting.

== Cast ==
- Robert Mitchum as Harry Kilmer
- Ken Takakura as Ken Tanaka (田中健, Tanaka Ken)
- Brian Keith as George Tanner
- Herb Edelman as Oliver Wheat
- Richard Jordan as Dusty
- Keiko Kishi as Eiko Tanaka (田中栄子, Tanaka Eiko)
- Eiji Okada as Toshiro Tono (遠野敏郎, Tōno Toshirō)
- James Shigeta as Goro Tanaka (田中吾郎, Tanaka Gorō)
- Kyosuke Machida as Jiro Kato (加藤二郎, Katō Jirō)
- Christina Kokubo as Hanako Tanaka (田中花子, Tanaka Hanako)
- Eiji Go as Spider/Shiro Tanaka (田中史郎, Tanaka Shirō), Goro's son
- Lee Chirillo as Louise Tanner
- William Ross as Tanner's guard

== Production ==
=== Original script ===
Paul Schrader says the idea for the film came from a letter sent to him by his brother Leonard, who was then living in Japan; Leonard had left the U.S. when he received his military draft induction card and found work teaching English at a Japanese university, but frequently found himself with nothing to do when radical students shut down the campus and ended up spending a lot of time in yakuza-run bars. He had also been watching yakuza films and been impressed by the presence of Ken Takakura and the rituals involved. He thought there was an interesting film to be made about a Westerner who became involved in the yakuza to such an extent he would "make that ultimate sacrifice that is so foreign to a Westerner. That is the premise we started out on, trying to create a plot that would result in that situation."

Schrader told the idea to co-producer Mark Hamilburg, who liked it and paid for the brothers to write it. They spent two months watching films, in particular Toei films at a cinema in Los Angeles. "By the time I started writing, I was thinking like a Toei screenwriter," says Schrader, who had envisioned William Holden in the lead role. They wrote the script in an apartment in Venice over a month, between Thanksgiving and Christmas. Schrader says Hamilburg saw the script "was going to be a hot item: the intensity with which people became interested was clear. He knew he was incapable of handling a high-level auction, so he went to Robin French" to handle the auction. French sold the script for $300,000.

Schrader later reflected:

It's hard to see now, looking back at a film which completely flopped, but it was a very commercial idea. It had a lot of commercial hooks plus a strong love story, rich characters, and an "in" theme. It seemed to have all the elements for a rich, commercial action romance.

=== Robert Aldrich ===
Originally, Robert Aldrich was to direct. Aldrich later called it "one of the few pictures I really wanted to make" although he wanted changes made. "It was a terrible script, I thought, but a sensational idea. I said, 'If I'm going to make this picture, I'm going to turn this script upside down.' I saw it one particular way, and Paul didn't see it that way." Warner Bros. initially wanted Charles Bronson in the lead role.

Aldrich thought his view might have prevailed if Lee Marvin had been cast in the lead, but Marvin disagreed with Warner Bros. over the size of the actor's fee. Instead they cast Robert Mitchum. Aldrich and Mitchum had worked together on The Angry Hills (1959), and the director said "I really considered him my friend, and I admired him. I think he's a brilliant actor - a strange, convoluted guy. I knew I wasn't his favorite director, but I never really knew he disliked me." The two of them met, and Mitchum told Warners afterwards he did not want to do the film with Aldrich. "Too bad," Aldrich said later. "I think it was possible to make a marvelous movie out of Yakuza."

=== Sydney Pollack ===
Sydney Pollack then became attached. Schrader says that Pollack wanted rewrites, notably a "softening" of the Harry character. Schrader says "I was fired, because I was unable to write what Sydney wanted. Sydney and I did not get along well, and he needed someone of his own age, whose work he respected, for feedback." Robert Towne came on to rewrite the film for $150,000.

Robert Redford was also interested but then decided he was not old enough.

Tetsurō Tamba was originally cast as Goro, but departed on short notice due to a scheduling conflict.

=== Filming ===
Principal photography began on March 19, 1974. Shooting took place at various locations in Tokyo, Osaka, and Kyoto. A sequence was filmed at the Kyoto International Conference Center. The director of photography, Kōzō Okazaki, was hired because he one of the few cinematographers in Japan who had experience with American directors (having shot Anatahan for Josef von Sternberg). Production later moved to Los Angeles for the film's opening scenes.

Pollack remarked in interviews on complications of filming in Japan, using Japanese crews and technicians, and adopting techniques and practices of Japanese filmmaking. Beyond language barriers, there were creative approaches that he synthesized into the film for being appropriate for the subject matter.

== Soundtrack ==
The Yakuza

Soundtrack album by Dave Grusin
- Released: July 2005
- Length: 1:10:22
- Label: Film Score Monthly
- Producer: Lukas Kendall

Professional ratings
Review scores
Source	Rating
AllMusic	4.5/5 stars

The musical score for The Yakuza was composed by Dave Grusin. The score applies both Western and Eastern musical influences in what director Sydney Pollack described as a way that "felt and sounded Japanese without being too strange for western ears." It featured percussion by Emil Richards and bass flautist Jerome Richardson.

A soundtrack album was released by Film Score Monthly in July 2005.

Track listing

1. "Prologue" 2:42
2. "Main Title" 3:17
3. "Samurai Source" 2:03
4. "Tokyo Return" 1:29
5. "20 Year Montage" 3:28
6. "Scrapbook Montage / Scrapbook Epilogue" 2:13
7. "Kendo Sword Ritual / Alter Ego / Night Rescue / Amputation / Amputation (alternate)" 3:19
8. "Man Who Never Smiles" 1:49
9. "Tanner to Tono / Tono Bridge / The Bath" 2:27
10. "Girl and Tea" 1:36
11. "Pavane" 1:10
12. "Get Tanner" 1:40
13. "Breather / Final Assault" 4:43
14. "The Big Fight" 5:51
15. "No Secrets" 1:32
16. "Sayonara" 2:02
17. "Apologies" 2:09
18. "Bows / End Title (Coda)" 1:46
19. "Shine On" 9:47
20. "Bluesy Combo" 6:20
21. "20 Year Montage / Scrapbook Montage (film mix)" 5:00
22. "End Title (film version)" 1:10
23. "Only the Wind" 2:50

== Reception ==
=== Box office ===
Schrader says the reception to the film was "disastrous. It cost five million and brought back maybe a million and a half".

He felt the casting of Mitchum — which he was "very pleased with" — hurt the movie at the box office and if Redford had played the role "we probably would have made money".

Schrader felt Pollack "directed against the grain of the script. I wrote a violent, underworld film about blood, duty, and obligation. He made a sort of rich, romantic, transcultural film. Either of those films would be interesting if fully realized, but the final product fell between those two stools; neither film was made. It didn't satisfy the audience that came to see the hard gangster world, and it didn't satisfy the Jeremiah Johnson audience — Sydney's audience — which came to see some poetic realism".

Schrader says his biggest regret from the film is that Takakura did not become an international star.

=== Contemporaneous reviews ===
The film received mixed reviews at the time of release. Roger Ebert gave the film a mixed review, awarding it two-and-a-half stars out of four. While praising the characterization and the performances of Robert Mitchum and Ken Takakura, he criticized the plot as being somewhat difficult to follow and expressed concern over the level of violence: "it's for audiences that have grown accustomed over the last few years to buckets of blood, disembowelments and severed hands flying through the air. It's very violent, and the fact that the violence has been choreographed by a skilled director (Sidney Pollack, who made They Shoot Horses, Don't They?) just makes it all the more extreme." Lawrence Van Gelder of The New York Times wrote, "Although admirable for its understated contrast of hoary ritual with modern trappings, The Yakuza ... is also didactic. It is slowed by the need to instruct its audience in the way of the yakuza; it is marred in its early exposition by some impenetrable Japanese-accented English; it is burdened by the attenuation of an unexciting love interest (which Mitchum's character freely admits being too old for); and a couple of formidably important revelations are simply dropped in, as though no one had the time to plot them properly."

Arthur D. Murphy of Variety called it "a confused and diffused film which bites off more than it can artfully chew." Gene Siskel of the Chicago Tribune gave the film three stars out of four and called it "a special kind of gangster picture" with "an extremely complex story" and "stylish sword-fighting sequences. But don't confuse them with the boring karate chops so common in the Oriental sludge that typically fills our downtown theaters. The fighting in The Yakuza is more ritualistic and more meaningful because we know who is attacking whom and why."

Kevin Thomas of the Los Angeles Times thought that the film "suffers from a self-consciousness so stultifying it never really comes alive, its sense of reality (or lack of it) deriving from other movies instead of life itself."

Gary Arnold of The Washington Post called the film "such a clumsy combination of violence and inscrutability that the action becomes slightly laughable," further observing, "The right director for this slightly dubious material would have been Sam Peckinpah, who possesses both a taste and a flair for violence ... Sydney Pollack, the director chosen, gets sentimental about violent men, but he isn't on their wavelength."

Tony Rayns of The Monthly Film Bulletin wrote that Takakura "dominates the screen" with "his masterfully understated performance," concluding, "If The Yakuza is ultimately no more than a curious footnote to the Western exploitation of Oriental action movies, then it finds at least some self-justification in bringing a major film personality to a much wider audience."

=== Retrospective analysis ===
Quentin Tarantino is an admirer of the film saying "for the last time as a lead, Mitchum was vibrantly alive... Takakura Ken's powerhouse performance, at the height of his fame, in this Hollywood Yakuza flick, seems even more of a triumph... the film's final coda, "The Finger cutting scene," is, for me, one of the great endings of any movie of its era. And arguably Mitchum's single greatest acting moment on film (as long as some fuckwad in the cinema doesn't laugh during it)."

On Rotten Tomatoes the film holds an approval rating of 51% based on 57 reviews with the consensus: "The Yakuza offers some rather stylish violence and an engrossing sense of place, but it's fatally cut down by convoluted plotting and Sydney Pollack's tepid direction."

== See also ==
- The Challenge (1982)
- Black Rain (1989)
- Brother (2001)
- Kill Bill (2003)
- Into the Sun (2005)
