= Christina Kokubo =

American actress (1950–2007)

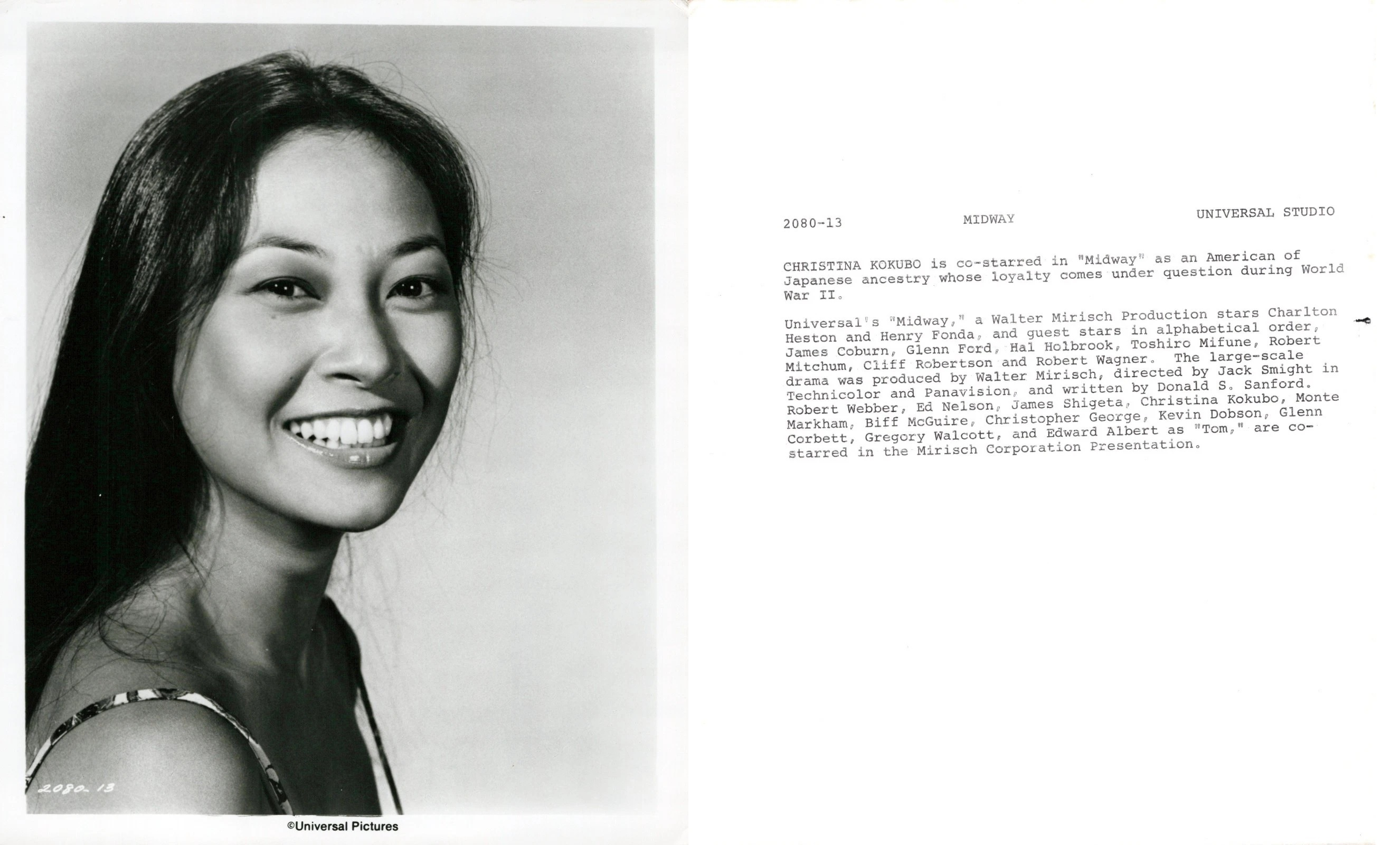
- Kokubo in Midway (1976)
- Born: July 27, 1950; Detroit, Michigan, U.S.
- Died: June 9, 2007 (aged 56)
- Occupations: Actress, drama teacher
- Years active: 1974–1997

Christina Kokubo (July 27, 1950, in Detroit, Michigan – June 9, 2007) was an American film and television actress; she was also a drama teacher.

== Career ==
Kokubo appeared in several feature films, including The Yakuza (1975), a neo-noir gangster film set in Japan, and Midway (1976), in which she played a Japanese-American who has a troubled romance with an American naval officer during World War II.

She also appeared in several television productions, including appearing as Paramedic Faith Yee in thirteen episodes (1984–1988) of St. Elsewhere, a medical-drama television series. Additionally, Kokubo participated in several documentary films about the yakuza crime syndicate in Japan.

In 1984, Kokubo portrayed a samurai's wife in Three Confessions at the Cast-at-the-Circle theater.

== Teaching and legacy ==
For seven years, Kokubo taught acting classes at the Braille Institute of America in Los Angeles. Spearheading the Los Angeles premier non-profit theater for the blind called "Changing Perceptions." Kokubo's Class — a non-profit organization that offers drama therapy to the disabled in the Los Angeles area, is named in her memory.

== Death ==
Christina Kokubo died in 2007, at age 56, of complications from breast cancer.

== Filmography ==
Year	Title	Role	Notes
1975	The Yakuza	Hanako	
1976	Midway	Haruko Sakura	
1978	Hawaii Five-O	Eugenie Barlow	TV series, Episode: "Invitation to Murder"
1986	Just Between Friends	Nurse	
1984–1988	St. Elsewhere	Paramedic Faith Yee	TV series, 14 episodes
