= Zero! The Story of Japan's Air War in the Pacific =

Zero! The Story of Japan's Air War in the Pacific is a book by Jiro Horikoshi and Masatake Okumiya. Martin Caidin was the translator of the English version, and he also wrote the introduction for that version. It was published in English in 1956 by E. P. Dutton & Co. in the United States. In the United Kingdom it was published as Zero! The Story of Japanese Navy Air Force: 1937-1945 by Cassell & Co., Ltd. in 1957. The British publisher also published the book in Australia.

Reviewer Sam F. Lucchese described the book as an "inside story" of the Pacific Theater of World War II. Reviewer J. R. of the The News and Observer described the Mitsubishi Zero as the "leading character" in the book, and E.A.H. of the Liverpool Daily Post stated that the Japanese Air Force is what the work is "primarily concerned" about.

Included in the book are diary entries by Horikoshi written by the time Japan surrendered, as well as Okumiya's writing about the Atomic bombings of Hiroshima and Nagasaki. Caidin stated that the book's narrative is by the two authors, even though Caidin expressed partial disagreement with the narrative.

Carl Kraft of the Virginian-Pilot stated that the narrative was done "frankly" and not dishonestly like some memoirs from people who had worked for Nazi Germany.

== Reception ==
Reviewer Hannah White Catlin wrote that the authors were "well qualified to give the inside information" and she highlighted how the book gave the thought processes of people in the Japanese armed forces; she added that for ordinary readers "Much of the book is too technical".

Reviewer Kyung Won Lee stated that the English translation was "lively" and that Caidin "does an excellent job".

Barbara G. Heath stated that the book was "interesting and historically important", and that Caidin had the narrative work at a quick pace.

Charley Reese stated that he "highly recommend"[ed] the book.

== See also ==
- Eagles of Mitsubishi - A book by Horikoshi
- Midway: The Battle that Doomed Japan - A book co-written by Okumiya
