= Eagles of Mitsubishi =

1970 book by Jiro Horikoshi

Eagles of Mitsubishi: The Story of the Zero Fighter (零戦――その誕生と栄光の記録, Zerosen-Sono tanjō to eikō no kiroku) is a book by Jiro Horikoshi, published in 1970 by Kappa Books, a part of Kobunsha. The English version, translated by Shojiro Shindo and Harold N. Wantiez, was published by University of Washington Press in 1981.

It refers to the creation of the Mitsubishi A6M Zero.

There are cases in the English version when Shindo and Wantiez had added corrections to mistakes that were in the original text, and the translators also added additional explanations.

== Reception ==
David G. Egler of Western Illinois University wrote that Shindo and Wantiez had "done a good job". According to Egler, the English version has a "modest" tone and "clear and unaffected" prose. Engler stated that the original author had "limited or inarticulate" ways of saying "abstract ideas" and "emotions".

Robert Van Der Linden of the National Air and Space Museum stated that the work is overall "excellent", and that the author "succeeds in telling the story of the genesis of this landmark fighter and the rise of Japanese technology to world standards." Van Der Linden argued that "brevity" was "The only serious flaw" as there were some aspects not explained in the book.

== See also ==
- Zero! The Story of Japan's Air War in the Pacific - A book coauthored by Horikoshi
