= Midway: The Battle that Doomed Japan (book) =

Book by Mitsuo Fuchida and Masatake Okumiya

Midway: The Battle that Doomed Japan is a book by Mitsuo Fuchida and Masatake Okumiya. It focused on the Battle of Midway. The English translation was published in 1955 by the United States Naval Institute.

== Reception ==
The San Antonio Light stated that the book had "well-informed appraisals" of events.

== See also ==
- Zero! The Story of Japan's Air War in the Pacific - A book co-written by Okumiya
