= Just Between Friends =

1986 film by Allan Burns

- Theatrical release poster
- Directed by: Allan Burns
- Written by: Allan Burns
- Produced by: Allan Burns
- Starring: Mary Tyler Moore; Christine Lahti; Sam Waterston; Ted Danson
- Cinematography: Jordan Cronenweth
- Edited by: Anne Goursaud
- Music by: Patrick Williams
- Production company: MTM Enterprises
- Distributed by: Orion Pictures
- Release date: March 21, 1986
- Running time: 110 minutes
- Country: United States
- Language: English
- Box office: $6.4 million

Just Between Friends is a 1986 American drama film about two women whose friendship is tested by tragedy. The film was written, produced and directed by Allan Burns, and it stars Mary Tyler Moore, Christine Lahti, Ted Danson and Sam Waterston.

== Plot ==
Holly Davis is a wife and mother, happily married to seismologist Chip Davis. She is not aware that he is having an affair with Sandy Dunlap, a television news reporter who interviewed him after an earthquake.

Holly begins teaching aerobics part-time at the gym, where she and Sandy meet by coincidence. Sandy and Holly become fast friends and Holly's children like Sandy as well. Sandy is a career-minded reporter trying to become an anchorwoman. Holly invites Sandy to a dinner at her home. It's then that Sandy realizes her married boyfriend is Holly's husband. Sandy tells Chip it's over, but he begs her to wait until they can talk after his upcoming trip. One day at work, a news bulletin reveals the death of Chip in a car crash.

Holly is devastated by the news and so is Sandy. Helga, the gym's owner, is ready to sell, so Sandy and Holly invest together. Holly learns the truth while clearing out her husband's office where she finds a photo of Sandy and Chip together. She angrily confronts Sandy who tells her that she was unaware that her new friend was the wife of the man she loved until the dinner party, then she ended it. Holly angrily ends their friendship.

Sandy begs for forgiveness, but Holly is devastated, hurt and angry, and refuses to forgive Sandy. Holly swears she will buy Sandy out of her share of the gym as soon as she is able and refuses to resume the close friendship they once shared.

Sandy discovers that she is pregnant, and she tells Holly, who is horrified by the news. Over time, Holly realizes that Sandy's child will also be her husband's child so she decides that she should try to forgive Sandy so that she can be a part of the child's life. Harry, Chip's co-worker, helps Sandy with her pregnancy. He also sees Holly, always having had a crush on her. Sandy rejects Holly's attempt at renewing their friendship at first but once the child is born, the film ends as they begin to repair their friendship and Harry kisses Holly.

== Cast ==
- Mary Tyler Moore as Holly Davis
- Christine Lahti as Sandy Dunlap
- Sam Waterston as Harry Crandall
- Ted Danson as Chip Davis
- Mark Blum as George Margolin
- Salome Jens as Helga
- Read Morgan as Charlie
- Beverly Sanders as Judy
- Robert Rothwell as Bill
- Susan Rinell as Kim Davis
- Timothy Gibbs as Jeff Davis
- Julie Payne as Karen
- Darwyn Carson as Janet
- Andra Akers as Andrea
- Diane Stilwell as Carla
- James MacKrell as Bill
- Robert Kino as Mr. Hasegawa
- Jane Greer as Ruth Chadwick
- George Wallace as Bob Chadwick
- Cástulo Guerra as Sportscaster
- Lisle Wilson as Newswriter
- Chet Collins as Stage Manager
- Lewis Arquette as TV Station Guard
- Terri Hanauer as Woman in Shower
- Helene Winston as Woman in Ice Cream Shop
- Gary Riley as Clerk in Ice Cream Shop
- Leda Siskind as Coffee Shop Waitress
- Christina Kokubo as Nurse
- Leslie Ann Rieder as Candy Striper

== Reception ==
Just Between Friends received generally negative reviews from critics. The film holds a 33% rating on Rotten Tomatoes based on 6 reviews. Roger Ebert of the Chicago Sun-Times was critical of the film saying it "labors over the smallest points of the most inconsequential scenes and then hurries past the big emotional climaxes".

== Home media ==
Just Between Friends was released on DVD by MGM Home Entertainment on January 13, 2004 as a Region 1 DVD.
