= Robert Rothwell =

American film and television actor

- Born: Robert Alexander Rothwell; November 20, 1930; Santa Barbara, California, U.S.
- Died: July 22, 2006 (aged 75); Woodland Hills, California, U.S.
- Occupations: Film and television actor

Robert Alexander Rothwell (November 20, 1930 – July 22, 2006) was an American film and television actor. He was best known for playing the recurring role of Officer Russo in the first season of the American police procedural television series Adam-12.

== Life and career ==
Rothwell was born in Santa Barbara, California. He began his screen career in 1958, appearing in the film Thundering Jets. In 1961, he played an uncredited role of a cowboy in the ABC anthology television series The Magical World of Disney.

Later in his career, Rothwell guest-starred in television programs including Gunsmoke, The Virginian, Lou Grant, The Six Million Dollar Man, Columbo, That Girl and Remington Steele, and played the recurring role of Officer Russo in the NBC police procedural television series Adam-12. He also appeared in films such as El Dorado, Just Between Friends, The Brady Bunch Movie, Hot Lead and Cold Feet, Now You See Him, Now You Don't, Breakheart Pass and Rio Lobo.

Rothwell retired from acting in 1995, last appearing in the CBS crime drama television series Murder, She Wrote. Aside from acting, he played tennis.

== Death ==
Rothwell died on July 22, 2006, in Woodland Hills, California, at the age of 75.
