= Chūichi Nagumo =

Japanese admiral (1887–1944)

- 南雲 忠一
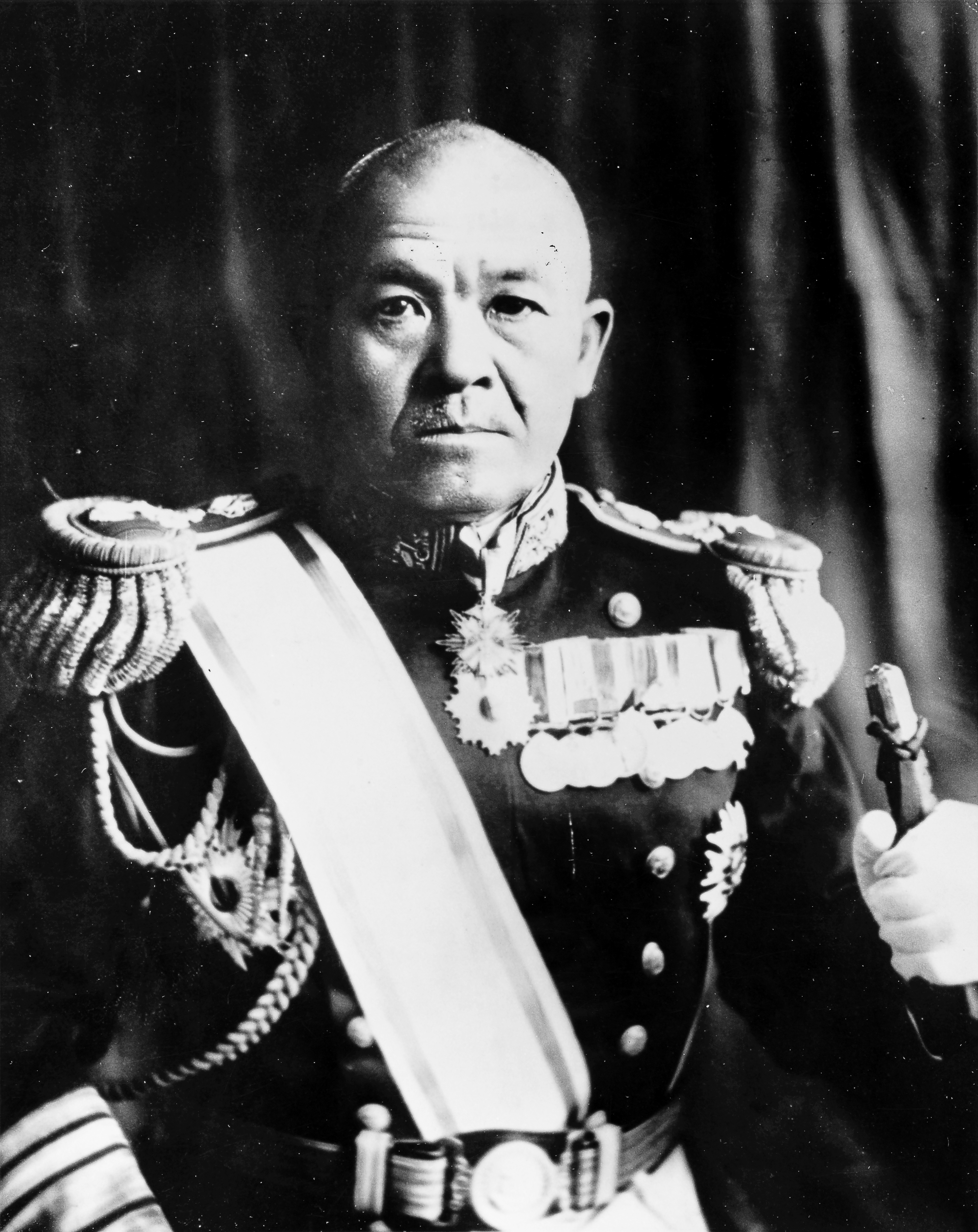
- Nagumo, c. 1941–42
- Born: 25 March 1887; Yonezawa, Yamagata, Japan
- Died: 6 July 1944 (aged 57); Saipan, South Seas Mandate
- Military career
- Allegiance: Empire of Japan
- Branch: Imperial Japanese Navy
- Service years: 1908–1944
- Rank: Admiral (posthumous)
- Commands: Kisaragi, Momi, Saga, Uji, Naka, 11th Destroyer Division, Takao, Yamashiro, 1st Destroyer Squadron, 8th Squadron, Naval Torpedo School, 3rd Squadron, Naval War College, 1st Air Fleet, 1st Carrier Division, 3rd Fleet, Sasebo Naval District, Kure Naval District, 1st Fleet, Central Pacific Area Fleet, 14th Air Fleet
- Conflicts: World War II; Pacific War; Attack on Pearl Harbor; Bombing of Darwin; Indian Ocean raid; Battle of Midway; Battle of the Eastern Solomons; Battle of the Santa Cruz Islands; Battle of Saipan ‡‡
- Awards: Order of the Rising Sun (3rd class); Order of the Rising Sun (4th class); Order of the Golden Kite (3rd class); Grand Cordon of the Order of the Sacred Treasure (1st class)

Chūichi Nagumo (南雲 忠一, Nagumo Chūichi; 25 March 1887 – 6 July 1944) was an admiral in the Imperial Japanese Navy (IJN) during World War II. Nagumo led Japan's main carrier battle group, the Kido Butai, in the attack on Pearl Harbor in 1941, and over the following months in successful raids on Darwin in Australia and in the Indian Ocean. In June 1942, he participated at the Battle of Midway, where his strike force suffered a crushing defeat. Nagumo was re-assigned to another fleet during the Guadalcanal campaign, and later stationed in the Japanese home islands. In 1944, he was deployed to a naval command in the Mariana Islands, where he committed suicide during the Battle of Saipan.

== Early life ==
Nagumo was born in the city of Yonezawa, Yamagata Prefecture, in northern Japan in 1887. He graduated from the 36th class of the IJN Academy in 1908, with a ranking of 8 out of a class of 191 cadets. As a midshipman, he served in the protected cruisers Soya and Niitaka and the armored cruiser Nisshin. After his promotion to ensign in 1910 he was assigned to cruiser Asama.

After attending torpedo and naval artillery schools, he was promoted to sub-lieutenant and served in the battleship Aki, followed by the destroyer Hatsuyuki. In 1914, he was promoted to lieutenant and was assigned to the battlecruiser Kirishima, followed by the destroyer Sugi. He was assigned his first command, the destroyer Kisaragi, on 15 December 1917.

Nagumo graduated from the Naval War College and was promoted to lieutenant commander in 1920. His specialty was torpedo and destroyer tactics.

From 1920 to 1921, he was captain of the destroyer Momi, but was soon sent to shore duty with various assignments by the IJN General Staff. He became a commander in 1924. From 1925 to 1926, Nagumo accompanied a Japanese mission to study naval warfare strategy, tactics, and equipment in Western Europe and the United States.

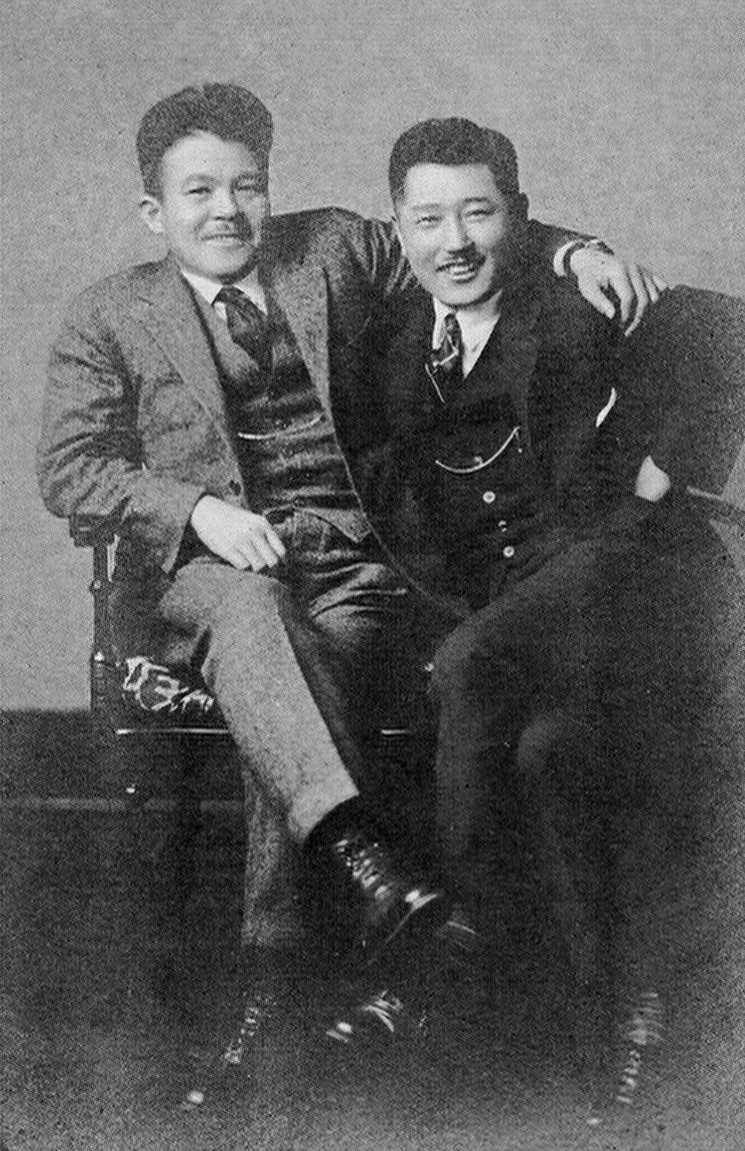
Nagumo (left) with his middle school friend Ichiro Saeki in Seattle, Washington in 1925

After his return to Japan, Nagumo was assigned to duties in Chinese territorial waters. He was appointed captain of the river gunboat Saga from 20 March 1926 to 15 October 1926, followed by the gunboat Uji from 15 October 1926 to 15 November 1927. He then served as an instructor at the IJN Academy from 1927 to 1929. Nagumo was promoted to captain in November 1929 and assumed command of the light cruiser Naka and from 1930 to 1931 was commander of the 11th Destroyer Division. After serving in administrative positions from 1931 to 1933, he assumed command of the heavy cruiser Takao from 1933 to 1934, and the battleship Yamashiro from 1934 to 1935. He was promoted to Rear Admiral on 1 November 1935.

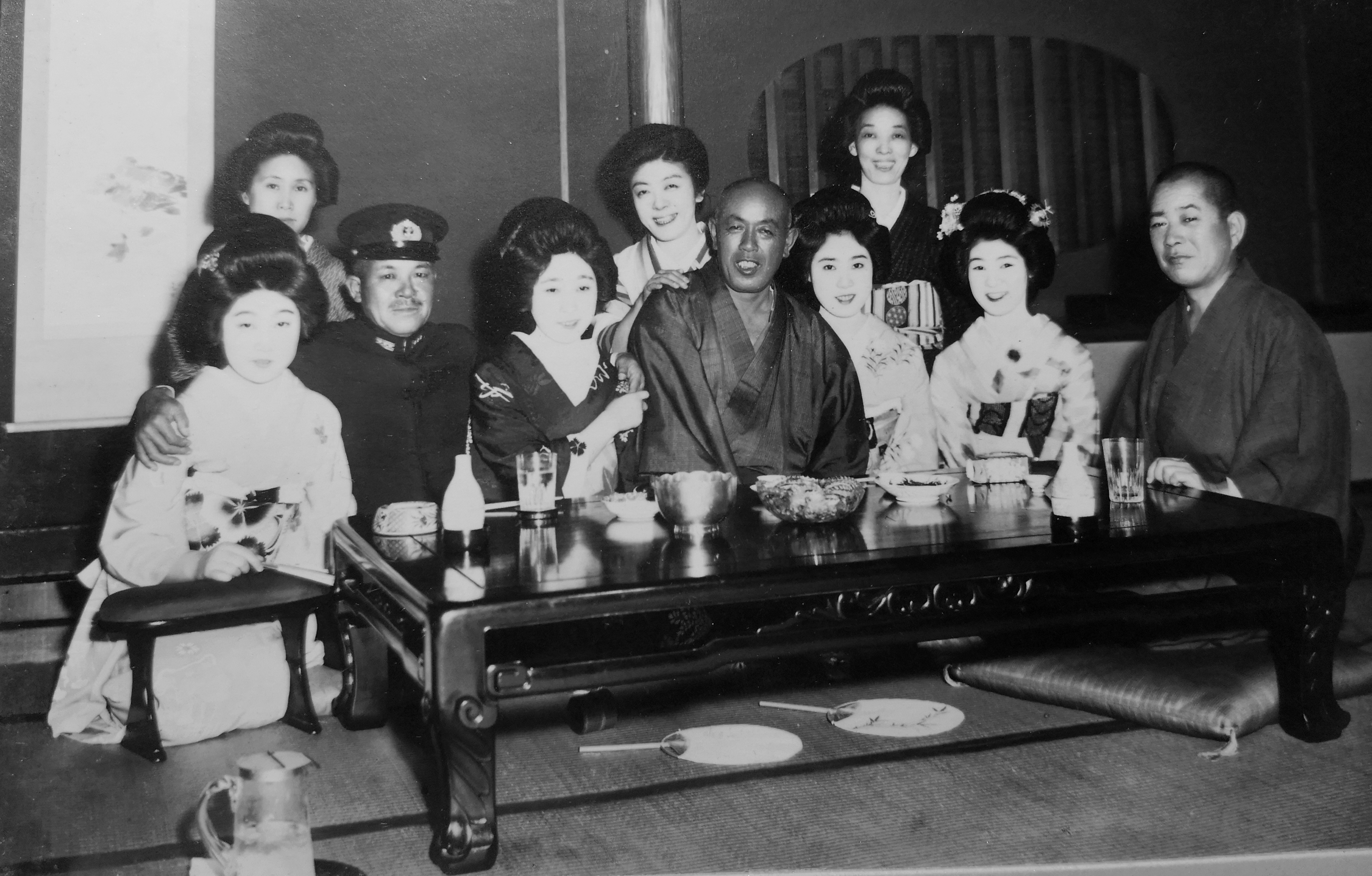
Nagumo (left) as captain of Takao with fellow naval officers Shinichirō Machida and Ayao Inagaki at an izakaya, 1933–1934

As a Rear Admiral, Nagumo commanded the 8th Cruiser Division to support Imperial Japanese Army movements in China from the Yellow Sea. As a leading officer of the militaristic Fleet Faction, he also received a boost in his career from political forces.

From 1937 to 1938, he was commandant of the Torpedo School, and from 1938 to 1939, he was commander of the 3rd Cruiser Division. Nagumo was promoted to vice admiral on 15 November 1939. From November 1940 to April 1941, Nagumo was commandant of the Naval War College.

== World War II ==
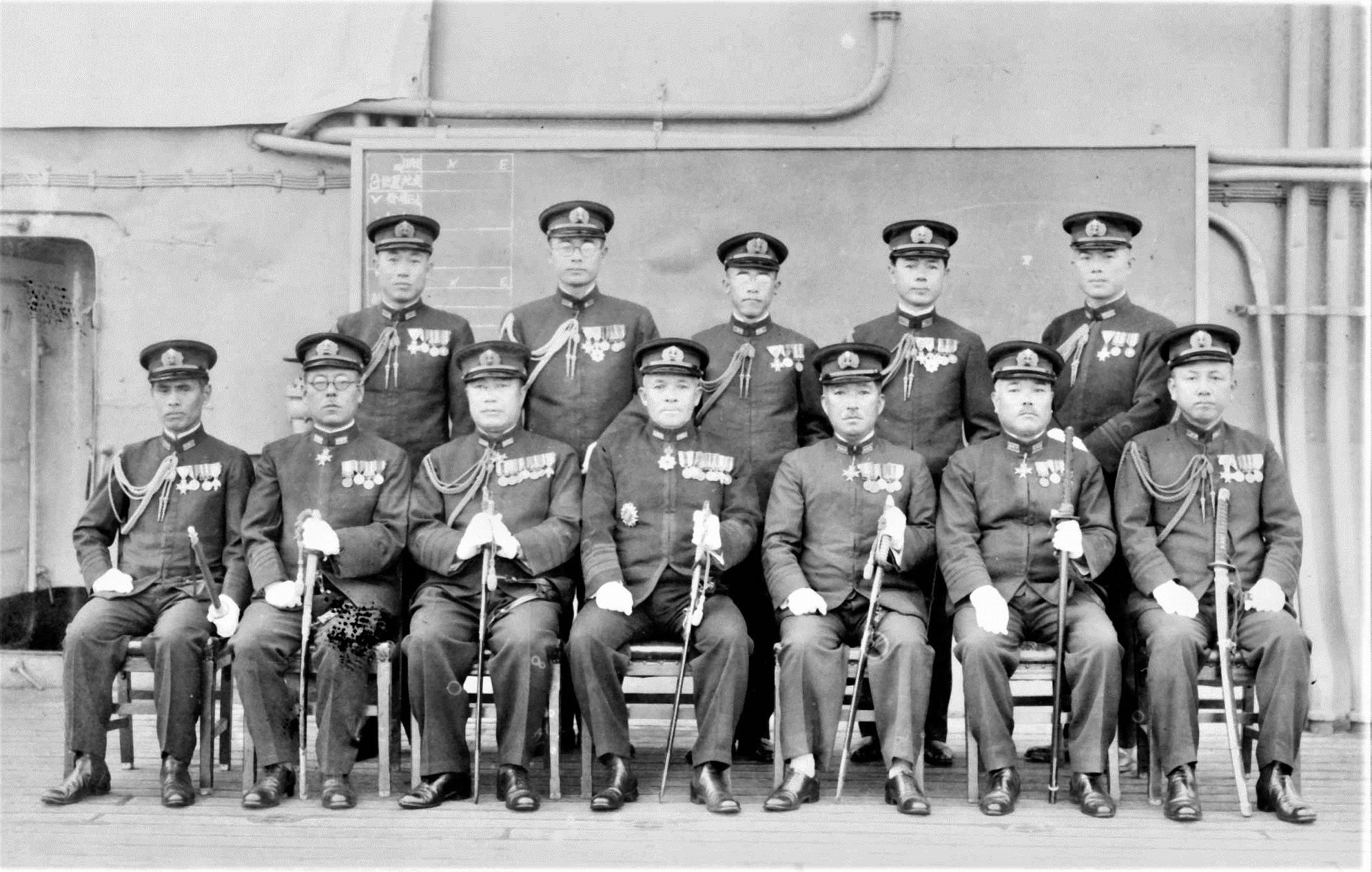
Nagumo (front row, center) with the staff of the 1st Air Fleet on Akagi, 10 April 1941 – 14 July 1942

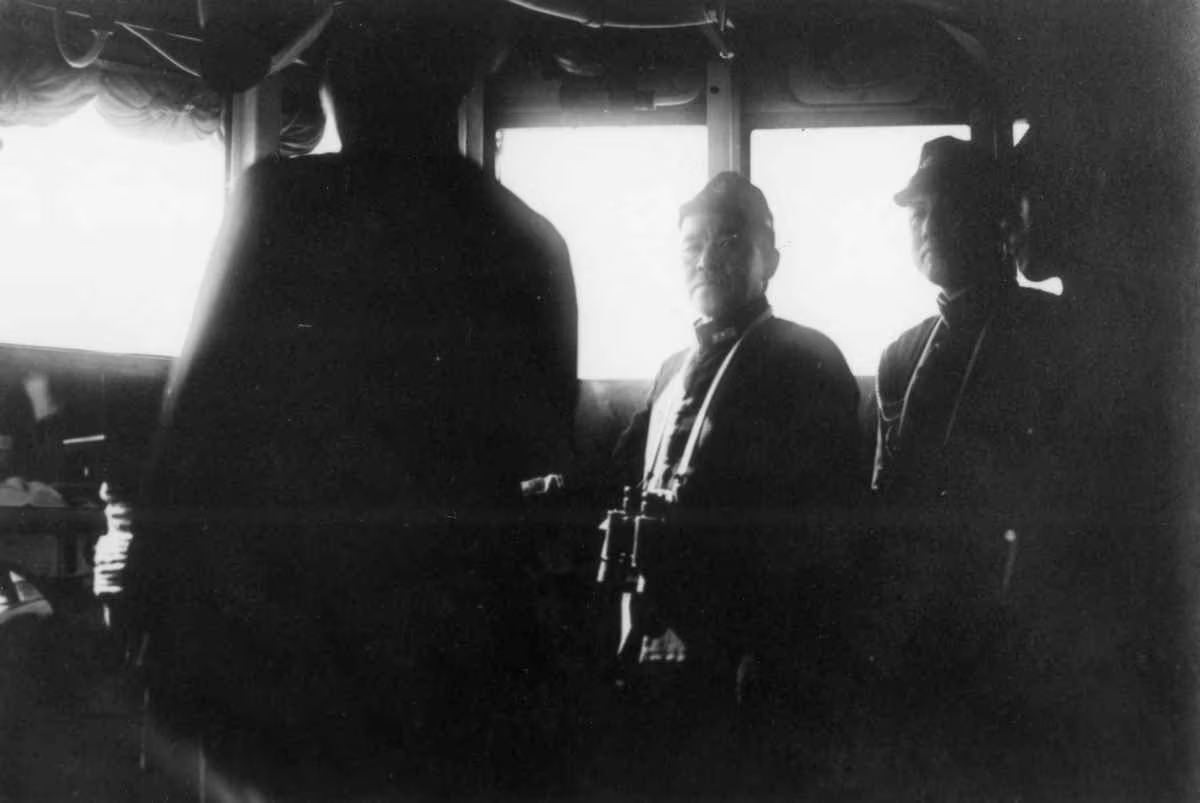
Nagumo in the bridge of Akagi en route to attack Pearl Harbor, 26 November – 7 December 1941

On 10 April 1941, Nagumo was appointed commander-in-chief of the 1st Air Fleet, the IJN's main carrier battle group, largely due to his seniority. Many contemporaries and historians have doubted his suitability for this command, given his lack of familiarity with naval aviation. Nagumo's friend and fellow admiral Nishizō Tsukahara would say that: "He (Nagumo) was wholly unfitted by background, training, experience, and interest for a major role in Japan’s naval air arm." Nagumo was appointed by the Navy General Staff. There were ongoing friction between the General Staff and Admiral Isoroku Yamamoto, with the General Staff being in general less excited about aviation, and more excited about surface warfare, so the thought was that having Nagumo, a surface warfare officer, in place would help counterbalance Yamamoto. Yamamoto unsuccessfully made the case to have Vice-admiral Jisaburō Ozawa in charge of First Air Fleet instead.

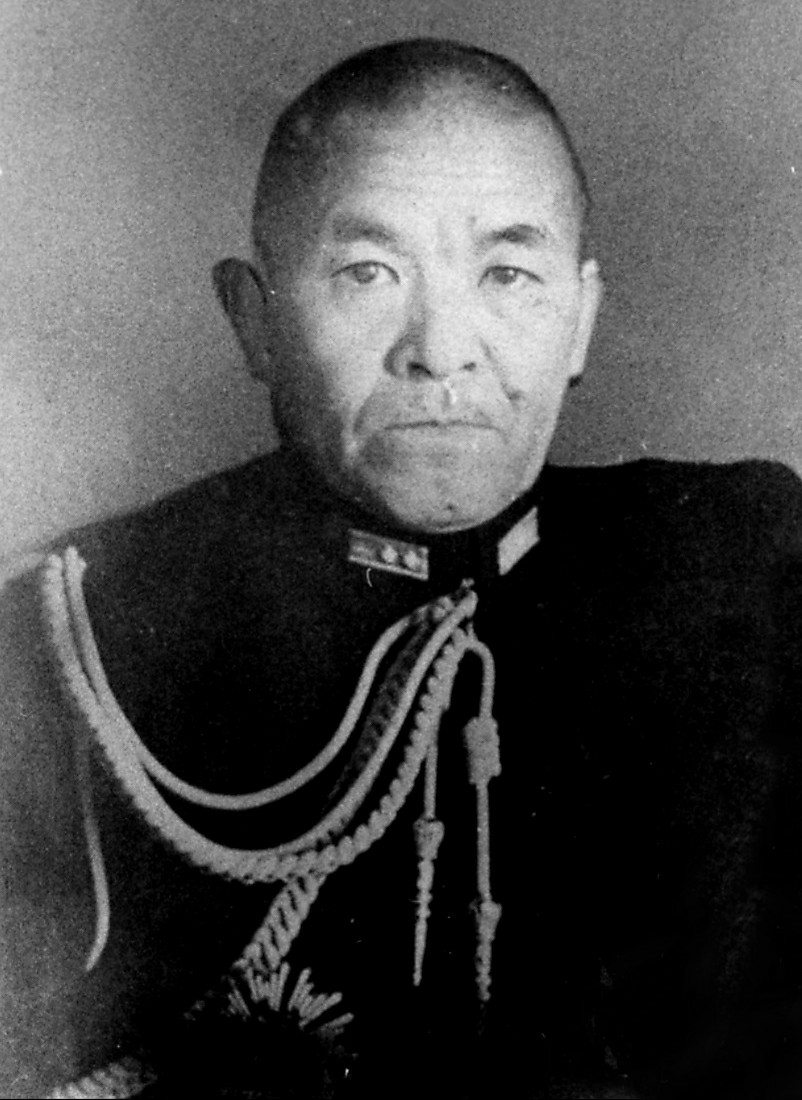
Nagumo as commander of the First Air Fleet

By this time, he had visibly aged, physically and mentally. Physically, he suffered from arthritis, possibly from his younger days as a kendoka.

Admiral Tsukahara had doubts about Nagumo's appointment, and commented, "Nagumo was an officer of the old school, a specialist of torpedo and surface maneuvers.... He did not have any idea of the capability and potential of naval aviation." One son of Nagumo described him as a brooding father, obsessed with and later regretful about pressuring his sons into joining the IJN. In contrast, Nagumo's junior naval officers thought of him as a father figure.

Despite his limited experience, he was a strong advocate of combining sea and air power, although he was opposed to Admiral Yamamoto's plan to attack the United States Navy Naval Station Pearl Harbor. While commanding the First Air Fleet, Nagumo oversaw the attack on Pearl Harbor, but he was later criticized for his failure to launch a third attack, which might have destroyed the fuel oil storage and repair facilities. This could have rendered the most important U.S. naval base in the Pacific useless, especially as the continued operation of the submarine base and the use of the intelligence station at the installation were critical factors in Japan's defeat in the Pacific War.

Nagumo was surrounded by able lieutenants such as Minoru Genda and Mitsuo Fuchida. He also fought well in the early 1942 campaigns, obtaining success as a fleet commander at the Bombing of Darwin and at the Indian Ocean raid on the Eastern Fleet, the latter of which sank an aircraft carrier, two cruisers, and two destroyers, and caused Admiral Sir James Somerville to retreat to East Africa.

=== Battle of Midway ===
The Battle of Midway, in June 1942, brought Nagumo's streak of victories to an end. During the battle, a Martin B-26 Marauder, seriously damaged by anti-aircraft fire, flew directly at the bridge of the aircraft carrier Akagi. The aircraft, either attempting a suicide ramming, or out of control, narrowly missed striking the carrier's bridge, which could have killed Nagumo, before it crashed into the ocean.

Nagumo soon prepared to launch another attack on Midway, in direct violation of Yamamoto's order to keep the reserve strike force armed for anti-ship operations. That change in plans required arming the available planes with bombs, suitable for attacking land targets, rather than torpedoes, designed for anti-ship actions.

However, when Nagumo received scouting reports that American ships were in the area, he changed plans and ordered his planes be rearmed with torpedoes to attack American ships. The situation caught his aircraft in-between, with half his planes armed with torpedoes and the other half with bombs and no time to switch everything back to torpedoes.

American dive-bombers attacked Akagi, Kaga and Sōryū, resulting in fires and further explosions due to unsecured ordnance, crippling all three. After the attack, Nagumo appeared to have gone into a state of shock; he stood near the ship's compass looking out at the flames on his ship and two other carriers, and despite being asked to shift his flag to another vessel, Nagumo was reluctant, muttering, “It's not time yet”. Nagumo's chief of staff, Rear Admiral Ryūnosuke Kusaka, was able to persuade him; Nagumo nodded, with tears in his eyes. Nagumo and his staff were forced to evacuate through the forward windows of the bridge by rope. An expert in judo, Nagumo landed lightly, whereas Kusaka badly sprained both ankles and was burned during the evacuation.

The First Air Fleet lost four carriers during the turning point of the Pacific War, and the massive losses of carrier aircraft maintenance personnel would prove detrimental to the performance of the IJN in later engagements. The loss of the four carriers, their aircraft, and their maintenance crews, plus the loss of 120 experienced pilots, resulted in Japan losing the strategic initiative in the Pacific.

In the aftermath of the battle, Kusaka found a downcast Nagumo, seemingly contemplating suicide; Kusaka eventually talked him out of it. Following the battle, Nagumo appeared to have lost his aggressiveness and effectiveness; he teared up when talking about the events of Midway to his two sons in 1944.

=== Later naval operations, Guadalcanal campaign and the Battle of Saipan ===
Afterwards, Nagumo was reassigned as commander-in-chief of the Third Fleet and commanded aircraft carriers in the Guadalcanal campaign in the battles of the Eastern Solomons and the Santa Cruz Islands. Despite the Japanese victory at the Santa Cruz Nagumo himself acknowledged that the attrition imposed to the Japanese Imperial Navy in these actions, especially with the loss of experienced pilots, was "shattering strategic loss for Japan", nowithstanding the tactical success.

On 11 November 1942, Nagumo was reassigned to Japan, where he was given command of the Sasebo Naval District. He then transferred to the Kure Naval District on 21 June 1943. From October 1943 to February 1944, Nagumo was once again made commander-in-chief of First Fleet.

As Japan's military situation deteriorated, Nagumo was deployed on 4 March 1944 for the short-lived command of the 14th Air Fleet and the Central Pacific Area Fleet in the Mariana Islands.

The Battle of Saipan began on 15 June 1944. The IJN, under Vice Admiral Jisaburō Ozawa, was overwhelmed within days by the U.S. 5th Fleet in the decisive Battle of the Philippine Sea, where Japan lost three fleet carriers and about 600 aircraft, none of which could be replaced. Nagumo and his Army peer Lieutenant General Yoshitsugu Saito were now on their own to keep control of Saipan.

=== Death ===
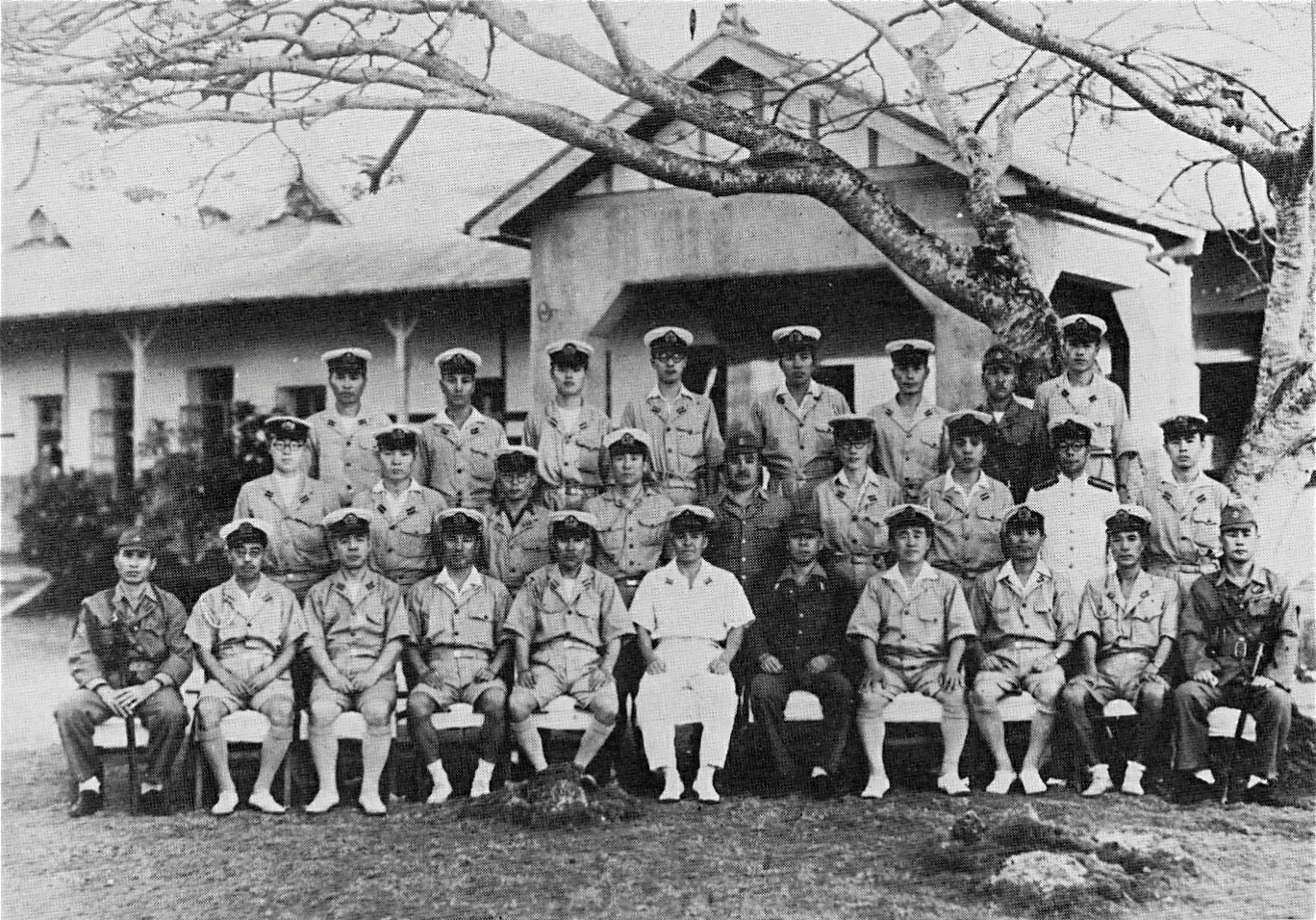
Last picture of Nagumo (center), Saipan, 1944

On 6 July 1944, Nagumo, unable to defend his position any longer and refusing to be taken captive, killed himself with a pistol shot to his temple. Defeated commanders were expected to perform seppuku in accordance with bushido, but he may not have had the time for such a complex ritual. His remains were recovered by U.S. Marines in a remote cave where he had been forced to maintain his headquarters due to extensive bombardment. He was posthumously made a full admiral and awarded the Grand Cordon of the Order of the Golden Kite.

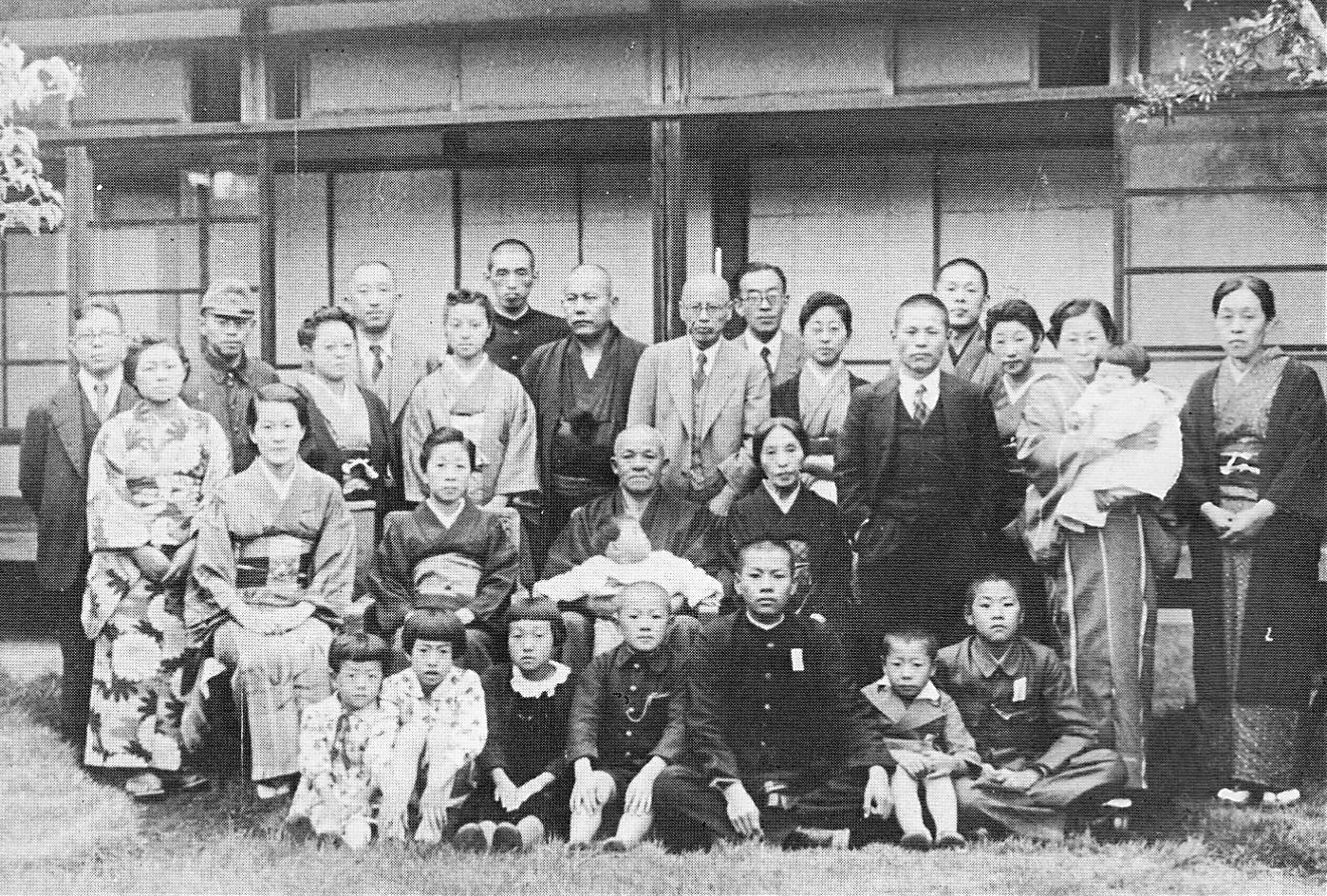
Nagumo family in 1943 with Chūichi Nagumo in the middle

Nagumo's grave is located at the Ōbai-in sub-temple of Engaku-ji in Kamakura, next to the grave of his son, Susumu Nagumo, who was killed in battle aboard the destroyer Kishinami on 4 December 1944.

== Naval career ==
IJN Insignia	Rank	Date
	海軍少尉候補生 Kaigun Shōi Kōhōsei (Midshipman)	21 November 1908
	海軍少尉 Kaigun Shōi (Ensign)	15 January 1910
	海軍中尉 Kaigun Chūi (Sub-Lieutenant/Lieutenant Junior Grade)	1 December 1911
	海軍大尉 Kaigun Daii (Lieutenant)	1 December 1914
	海軍少佐 Kaigun Shōsa (Lieutenant-Commander)	1 December 1920
	海軍中佐 Kaigun Chūsa (Commander)	1 December 1924
	海軍大佐 Kaigun Daisa (Captain)	30 November 1929
	海軍少将 Kaigun Shōshō (Rear-Admiral)	15 November 1935
	海軍中将 Kaigun Chūjō (Vice-Admiral)	15 November 1939
	海軍大将 Kaigun Taishō (Admiral)	8 July 1944 (Posthumous)

== Notes ==
Military offices
Preceded by Ban Jirō	Naka; Commanding Officer; 30 November 1929 – 1 December 1930	Succeeded by Yamada Sadao
Preceded by Sawamoto Yorio	Takao; Commanding Officer; 15 November 1933 – 15 November 1934	Succeeded by Gotō Eiji
Preceded by Kojima Kentarō	Yamashiro; Commanding Officer; 15 November 1934 – 15 November 1935	Succeeded by Ookuma Masakichi
Preceded by Sawamoto Yorio	Naval War College; Headmaster; 1 November 1940 – 10 April 1941	Succeeded by Acting Headmaster; Abe Kasuke; Headmaster; Ozawa Jisaburō
Fleet created	1st Air Fleet; Commander-in-chief; 10 April 1941 – 14 July 1942	Succeeded by Fleet reorganized as 3rd Fleet; Himself; Fleet dissolved, post next held by Kakuji Kakuta
Preceded by Fleet reorganized from 1st Air Fleet; Himself; Fleet recreated, post last held by Takahashi Ibō	3rd Fleet; Commander-in-chief; 14 July 1942 – 11 November 1942	Succeeded by Ozawa Jisaburō
Preceded by Tanimoto Matarō	Sasebo Naval District; Commander-in-chief; 11 November 1942 – 21 June 1943	Succeeded by Komatsu Teruhisa
Preceded by Takahashi Ibō	Kure Naval District; Commander-in-chief; 21 June 1943 – 20 October 1943	Succeeded by Nomura Naokuni
Preceded by Shimizu Mitsumi	1st Fleet; Commander-in-chief; 20 October 1943 – 25 February 1944	Fleet dissolved
Fleet created	Central Pacific Area Fleet & 14th Air Fleet; Commander-in-chief; 4 March 1944 – 8 July 1944	Post left vacant following Nagumo's death Fleet dissolved 18 July 1944
