= Masatake Okumiya =

Historian and lieutenant general

- 奥宮 正武
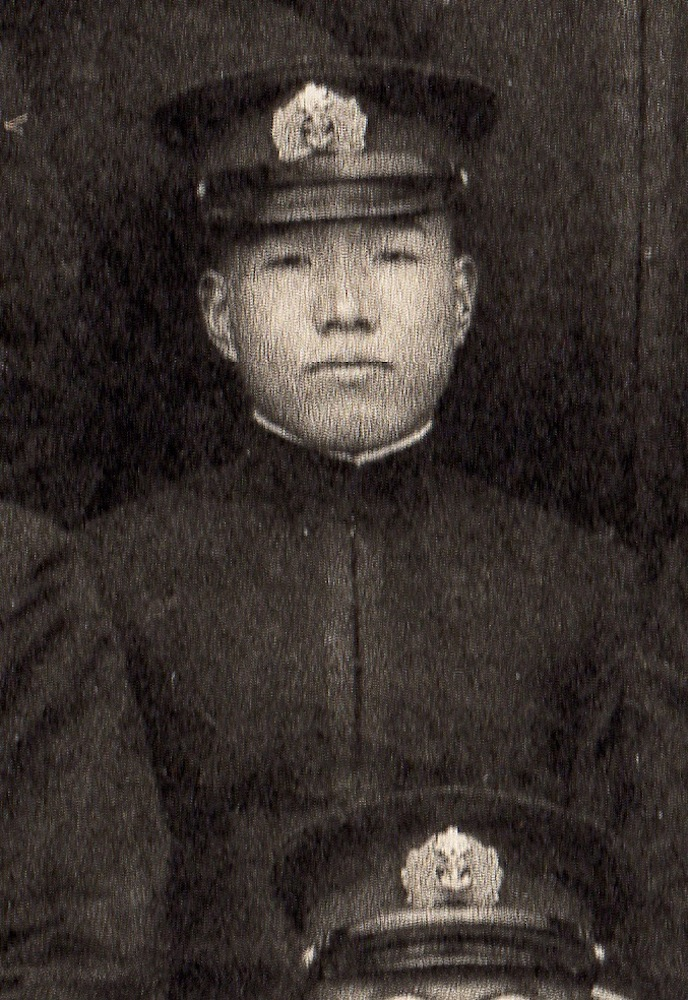
- Born: July 27, 1909
- Died: February 22, 2007 (aged 97)
- Military career
- Allegiance: Japan
- Branch: Imperial Japanese Navy; Japan Air Self-Defense Force
- Service years: 1930–1945 (IJN); 1954–1964 (JASDF)
- Rank: Commander (IJN); Lieutenant General (JASDF)
- Conflicts: World War II
- Other work: Historian

Masatake Okumiya (奥宮 正武, Okumiya Masatake; July 27, 1909 – February 22, 2007) was a historian and lieutenant general in the Japan Air Self-Defense Force.

Okumiya graduated from the Imperial Japanese Naval Academy in 1930 as a midshipman. He was commissioned an ensign in April 1932, received his wings in November 1933 as a naval aviator, and was promoted to sub-lieutenant in the same month. He entered the Naval Air Corps at Ōmura, receiving promotion to lieutenant in December 1936. In 1937, he participated in the attack on the USS Panay. Promoted to lieutenant-commander in October 1941, Okumiya served throughout World War II, including on the aircraft carrier Ryūjō and with the 2nd Air Fleet of the Imperial Japanese Navy. During 1942–1943, he served as chief of staff of the 26th Naval Air Squadron, and was appointed to a staff post in August 1944. He was promoted to his final rank of commander in November 1944. At the end of the war, Okumiya was interrogated by Allied intelligence officers, after which he was demobilized.

Following the occupation of Japan, he joined the nascent Japan Air Self-Defense Force in 1954. He returned to active duty in July 1957 with the rank of colonel, and was appointed commander of the air base at Utsunomiya. He was promoted to major general in February 1958 and served as deputy head of Personnel and Training from August 1959 to April 1960. He commanded the 3rd Air Wing from Komaki Air Base in 1961, followed by command of the Ichigaya Air Base in 1962. He was promoted to lieutenant-general in 1963 and ended his career as commander of the ATC and Meteorological Group. He retired the following year.

Okumiya wrote extensively on Japan's role in World War II. He co-wrote with Mitsuo Fuchida Midway: The Battle that Doomed Japan; the Japanese Navy's Story, published 1955. His remark that "I am firmly convinced that the Pacific War was started by men who did not understand the sea, and fought by men who did not understand the air." is often quoted. He also co-wrote, with Jiro Horikoshi and Martin Caidin, an historical account of the Mitsubishi A6M Zero, titled Zero! The book was published in 1956.
