= Jiro Horikoshi =

Japanese aircraft engineer (1903–1982)

- 堀越 二郎
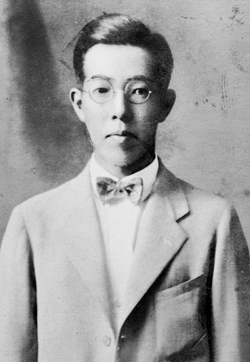
- Horikoshi while a student at Tokyo Imperial University
- Born: 22 June 1903; Fujioka, Gunma Prefecture, Empire of Japan
- Died: 11 January 1982 (aged 78); Tokyo, Japan
- Education: University of Tokyo
- Spouse: Sumako Horikoshi
- Children: 5
- Engineering career
- Projects: A7M "Reppu"
- Significant design: A5M; A6M "Zero"; J2M "Raiden"

Jiro Horikoshi (堀越 二郎, Horikoshi Jirō; 22 June 1903 – 11 January 1982) was a Japanese aeronautical engineer. He was the chief engineer of several Japanese fighter aircraft designs used during World War II, most notably the Mitsubishi A6M Zero fighter, as well as the NAMC YS-11.

== Early life ==
Jiro Horikoshi was born near the city of Fujioka, Gunma Prefecture, Japan, in 1903. Horikoshi graduated from the newly established Aviation Laboratory (Kōkū Kenkyūjo) within the Engineering Department of the University of Tokyo, and started his career in Mitsubishi Internal Combustion Engine Company Limited, which later became Mitsubishi Heavy Industries, Nagoya Aircraft Manufacturing Plant.

== Engineering career ==
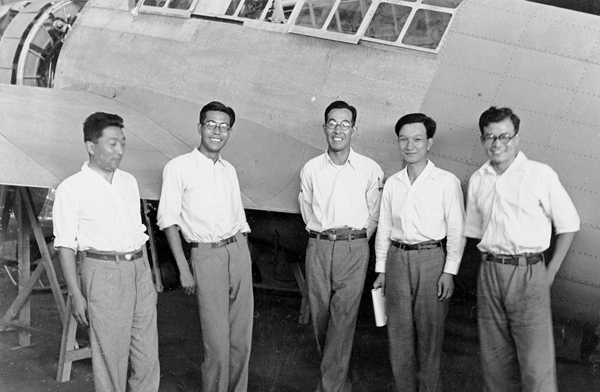
Horikoshi (center) and members of the A6M1 design team, Mitsubishi Heavy Industries (July 1937)

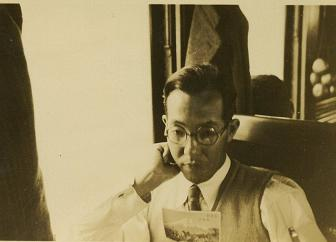
Horikoshi (October 1938)

One of Jiro Horikoshi's first works was the flawed Mitsubishi 1MF10, an experimental aircraft that never passed the prototype stage after some flight tests. However, lessons learned from this design led to the development of the far more successful Mitsubishi A5M (Allied codename "Claude") which entered mass production in 1936.

In 1937, Horikoshi and his team at Mitsubishi were asked to design Prototype 12 (corresponding to the 12th year of the Shōwa era). Prototype 12 was completed in July 1940, and it was accepted by the Imperial Japanese Navy. Since 1940 was the Japanese year 2600, the new fighter was named as "Model 00", "Zero", or A6M Zero, in Japan also known as the "Rei-sen" (literally meaning "zero fight", shortened for model zero fighter airplane). Subsequently, he was involved with designing many other fighters manufactured by Mitsubishi, including the Mitsubishi J2M Raiden ("Thunderbolt") and the Mitsubishi A7M Reppu ("Strong gale").

== World War II ==
=== Pearl Harbor ===
Despite Mitsubishi's close ties to the Japanese military establishment and his direct participation in the nation's buildup towards the Second World War, Horikoshi was strongly opposed to what he regarded as a futile war. Writing during the final year of the war in his personal diary, published in 1956:

When we awoke on the morning of December 8, 1941, we found ourselves — without any foreknowledge — to be embroiled in war... Since then, the majority of us who had truly understood the awesome industrial strength of the United States never really believed that Japan would win this war. We were convinced that surely our government had in mind some diplomatic measures which would bring the conflict to a halt before the situation became catastrophic for Japan. But now, bereft of any strong government move to seek a diplomatic way out, we are being driven to doom. Japan is being destroyed. I cannot do [anything] other but to blame the military hierarchy and the blind politicians in power for dragging Japan into this hellish cauldron of defeat.

=== Earthquake ===
On 7 December 1944, a powerful earthquake in the Tokai region forced Mitsubishi to halt aircraft production at its plant in Ohimachi, Nagoya. An air raid by B-29s on the Mitsubishi Engine Works in Daiko-cho, Nagoya a week later caused extensive damage to the works and a severe setback in production. Horikoshi, who had been at a conference in Tokyo with Imperial Navy officers to discuss the new Reppu fighter, returned to Nagoya on the 17th, in time to experience another air raid on the Mitsubishi factories the next day. As a result of the air raid, the company evacuated its machinery and engineers to the suburbs of eastern Nagoya. Horikoshi and the Engineering Department were rehoused in a school building which had been requisitioned.

=== Illness ===
Exhausted and overworked, Horikoshi fell ill with pleurisy on 25 December and remained bedridden through early April. During this time, he recorded in detail the horrors of the increasing American air raids on Tokyo and Nagoya, including the devastating Operation Meetinghouse Tokyo incendiary raid of 9–10 March. A massive air raid on Nagoya the following night, with B-29s hurling "tens of thousands of incendiary bombs," destroyed most of the largely wooden city. On 12 March, Horikoshi sent most of his family, including his elderly mother, children and brother-in-law, to his home village near Takasaki to be safe from the bombings, though his wife, Sumako, remained with him in Nagoya.

Though greatly weakened by his long illness, Horikoshi returned to work at Mitsubishi in May. He was assigned to the company's No. 1 Works, located at Matsumoto in Nagano Prefecture. While on the train to Matsumoto, he witnessed the true scale of the war's impact on Nagoya:

For the first time, I really saw the effects of the incendiary raids on Nagoya. The city is a wasteland, charred and unspeakably desolate. My former factory is a ghostly, steel-ribbed wreck, shattered by bombs and torn apart by the dispersal crews. It is hard to believe that all this is true. I knew that soon I would be well. Strangely, though, I had little desire to return to work. The impression of the shattered city and the wrecked factories will not leave me.

Still very weak, Horikoshi was sent home to rest after only a week back at work. He returned to his hometown, where he rejoined his family and rested through the month of July. In his diary, he recorded how they could still hear distant explosions as the Allies bombed nearby Takasaki and Maebashi. During the war's final months, Horikoshi recorded Japan's descent into chaos and exhaustion. Though he returned to work at the Matsumoto plant on 22 July, as Matsumoto had been spared from air raids, he found the workforce demoralised and operations in chaos as a result of the emergency evacuations which had scattered employees and workshops around the country. He reported that most of the remaining Mitsubishi employees abandoned all efforts to work by early August and prepared for Japan's defeat and surrender, which came on 15 August, six days after the atomic bombing of Nagasaki.

== Post-war ==
After the war, Horikoshi participated in the design of the YS-11 with Hidemasa Kimura. He subsequently left Mitsubishi and taught at educational and research institutions. From 1963 to 1965, he was a lecturer at the University of Tokyo's Institute of Space and Aeronautics, and was subsequently a professor at the National Defense Academy from 1965 to 1969. Between 1972 and 1973, he was a professor of the Faculty of Engineering of Nihon University.

In 1956, Horikoshi collaborated on a book about the Zero with Masatake Okumiya, a general in the JASDF and a former Imperial Navy commander who had led Zero fighter squadrons during the war. The book was published in the US in 1956 as Zero: The Story of Japan's Air War in the Pacific.

== Later life ==
In semi-retirement by the early 1970s, he served as an advisor to the society of Japanese aircraft constructors, and continued to receive letters from aircraft enthusiasts around the world. On a trip to New York, he travelled to Long Island and stayed in the Garden City Hotel, where Charles Lindbergh had spent the night before his solo trans-Atlantic flight in 1927.

In the 1973 autumn honours list, Horikoshi was awarded the Order of the Rising Sun, Third Class, for his achievements. His memoir regarding the development of the Zero was published in Japan in 1970, and was translated by the University of Washington Press as Eagles of Mitsubishi: The Story of the Zero Fighter, which was published in English in 1981.

Horikoshi died of pneumonia in a Tokyo hospital on 11 January 1982, aged 78. His obituary was covered in several major newspapers around the world. He was posthumously promoted to the fourth rank in the order of precedence. He was survived by five children, none of whom pursued a career in aircraft design or engineering.

== In popular culture ==
Horikoshi is the subject of The Wind Rises, a fictionalized biographical animated film by Hayao Miyazaki, released in 2013, in which his voice was provided by Hideaki Anno (and Joseph Gordon-Levitt in the English dub). In particular, although the film follows the progression of his aircraft designs, the details of his personal life are mostly fictitious (for example, he had an older brother, not a younger sister). These additional plot elements were adapted by Miyazaki from Tatsuo Hori's 1937 novel The Wind Has Risen.

== Honors ==
- Japan:
  - Order of the Rising Sun, 3rd Class (1973)
