= Shattered Sword =

2005 nonfiction book

Shattered Sword: The Untold Story of the Battle of Midway
- Author: Anthony P. Tully; Jonathan Parshall
- Subject: War
- Published: 2005
- Publication place: United States
- Website: shatteredswordbook.com

Shattered Sword: The Untold Story of the Battle of Midway is a 2005 book by Anthony P. Tully and Jonathan Parshall, describing the Battle of Midway in June 1942.

It won the 2005 John Lyman Book Award from the North American Society for Oceanic History for the category "U.S. Naval History".
