= Isamu Kashiide =

- 樫出 勇
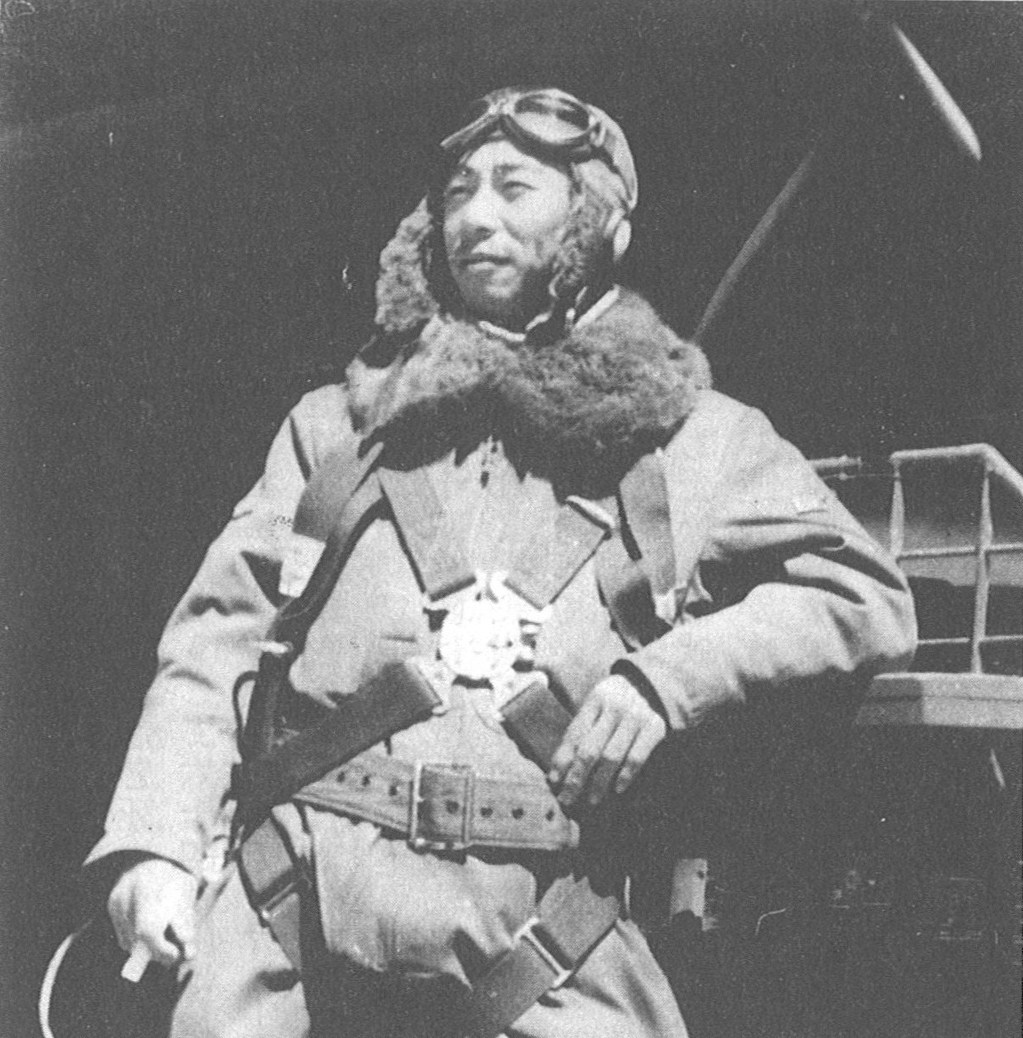
- Born: February 1915; Kashiwazaki, Niigata, Japan
- Died: May 2003 (aged 88)
- Military career
- Allegiance: Empire of Japan
- Branch: Imperial Japanese Army
- Service years: 1934–1945
- Rank: Captain
- Conflicts: Second Sino-Japanese War; World War II; Pacific War
- Awards: Bukochosho

Isamu Kashiide (樫出 勇, Kashiide Isamu; February 1915 – May 2003) was a Japanese army aviator and flying ace known for achieving the highest number of victories over Boeing B-29 Superfortresses. He claimed to have shot down 26 of the heavy bombers; 7 were later confirmed.

== Career ==
Kashiide was born in February 1915 in the seacoast town of Kashiwazaki, Kariwa District, Niigata Prefecture, Japan. In February 1934, he enrolled as a cadet in the Imperial Japanese Army flying school in Tokorozawa, Saitama. He graduated in November 1935, then entered fighter pilot school at Akeno Army Flying School northeast of Ise, Mie. His first squadron assignment was the 1st Rentai, probably flying the Kawasaki Ki-10 biplane. Kashiide was posted to China in July 1938 with the 59th Sentai, flying the Nakajima Ki-27 Type 97 Nate fighter, but he saw little action in the Hankou area. In September 1939, he fought in the final Battles of Khalkhin Gol in Mongolia. During one sortie on 15 September, he fought against eight Polikarpov I-16s, downing two then breaking from the remaining six by flying away at tree-top altitude. He claimed a total of seven aerial victories in Mongolia to become a flying ace. His air unit was ordered back to Hankou.

In early 1940, Kashiide was assigned to the 4th Sentai. This unit moved to Formosa (now known as Taiwan), to provide air defense. In December 1940, Kashiide enrolled as an officer candidate in the Imperial Japanese Army Air Force Academy northwest of Tokyo. He graduated in July 1941 and was given a commission as second lieutenant in October. Kashiide performed defense duties in the venerable Type 97 fighter until the start of the Pacific War in December 1941. Kashiide assisted with the invasion of the Philippines but did not increase his number of aerial victories. After returning home to Kozuki Airfield, he was promoted to lieutenant in April 1943.

In mid-1943, Kashiide transitioned to fly the Kawasaki Ki-45 Toryu (Dragon Slayer), a powerful twin-engine fighter heavily armed with one 37 mm and two 20 mm autocannon. Defending against the first attacks by Boeing B-29 Superfortresses bombing the Japan Home Islands, on 15–16 June 1944 during the Bombing of Yawata, Kashiide claimed two B-29s and possibly a third. On 20 August 1944, he claimed three B-29s downed and three more damaged, among the 14 B-29s lost on the mission. He developed a preference for frontal assault on the B-29, aiming at the nose of the aircraft, much as many earlier Luftwaffe pilots had done in attacking Eighth Air Force B-17 Flying Fortresses in the European Theater; he trained other flyers to use his style of attack.

Flying over Tokyo on 27 January 1945, Kashiide attacked a B-29 and disabled it with one shot to the nose. On 27 March 1945, he downed three B-29s and damaged others. On 8 May 1945, Kashiide was awarded the Bukosho B-Class (the Badge of Courage) by Lieutenant General Isamu Yokoyama, citing the 27 March action. In the next month he was promoted to the rank of captain.

== Legacy ==
After the war, Kashiide's claim of 26 B-29s and 7 Soviet fighters was disputed by other pilots and historians. A total of 7 B-29s and 2 Soviet I-16s is generally accepted as confirmed.

On 17 September 1985 Kashiide shook hands with the navigator of the B-29 he shot down in January 1945: Raymond F. "Hap" Halloran. Halloran parachuted from his stricken aircraft to land in Japan and become a prisoner of war. Halloran survived the experience and returned 40 years later to seek closure over his wartime experiences. The two men met in Kashiide's hometown (Kashiwazaki, Niigata) where Kashiide was living quietly in retirement.
