= Mitsubishi Ki-33 =

1936 Japanese experimental military aircraft

Ki-33
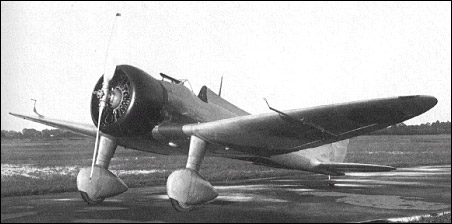
- Mitsubishi Ki-33

General information
- Type: Experimental Fighter Aircraft
- Manufacturer: Mitsubishi Heavy Industries
- Designer: Jiro Horikoshi
- Primary user: IJA Air Force
- Number built: 2

History
- First flight: 1936

The Mitsubishi Ki-33 (キ33, Ki-sanjūsan) was an experimental monoplane fighter aircraft designed for the Japanese Imperial Army. Two prototypes flew in 1936 but the design never entered production.

== Design and development ==
The Ki-33 was initially produced by Mitsubishi in response to Japanese army specifications for a fighter to replace the existing Kawasaki Ki-10 biplane. In mid-1935, Kawasaki, Mitsubishi and Nakajima were instructed to build competitive prototypes. Mitsubishi, preoccupied with refining the Ka-14 into the A5M fighter and adapting the G3M bomber for series production for the Imperial Japanese Navy, lacked sufficient design capacity to develop another fighter from scratch, and therefore submitted its earlier and unsuccessful Ki-18 design, with comparatively minor changes, as the Ki-18 had proven to be a good fighter aircraft and the reasons for its rejection were based on principles rather than quality.

Labeled the Mitsubishi Ki-33, the modified design was powered by a Nakajima Ha-1-Ko engine rated at 555 kW (744 hp) at 3,700 m (12,100 ft). An aft-sliding canopy was added, the aft fuselage decking was raised and the vertical tail surfaces were modified. The prototypes were completed during the early summer of 1936. Service trials from November 1936 until the spring of 1937 proved that the Kawasaki Ki-28 was the fastest of the three contenders, but the Nakajima Ki-27 was by far the most maneuverable, and on this basis was selected by the Imperial Japanese Army Air Force.

== Operators ==
Japan

- Imperial Japanese Army Air Force

== Specifications ==
Data from Famous Airplanes of the World #76: Army Experimental Fighters

General characteristics

- Crew: 1
- Length: 7.54 m (24 ft 9 in)
- Wingspan: 11 m (36 ft 1 in)
- Height: 3.19 m (10 ft 6 in)
- Wing area: 17.8 m^{2} (192 sq ft)
- Empty weight: 1,132 kg (2,496 lb)
- Max takeoff weight: 1,462 kg (3,223 lb)
- Powerplant: 1 × Nakajima Ha1-Ko 9-cylinder air-cooled radial piston engine, 556 kW (746 hp)
- Propellers: 2-bladed variable-pitch propeller

Performance

- Maximum speed: 474 km/h (295 mph, 256 kn) at 3,000 m (9,800 ft)
- Rate of climb: 14.04 m/s (2,764 ft/min)
- Wing loading: 82.1 kg/m^{2} (16.8 lb/sq ft)
- Power/mass: 0.36 kW/kg (0.22 hp/lb)

Armament

- Guns: 2 × fixed, forward-firing 7.7 mm (0.303 in) Type 89 machine guns

== See also ==
Related development

- Mitsubishi Ka-14
- Mitsubishi A5M
- Mitsubishi Ki-18

Related lists

- List of military aircraft of Japan
