= Benegal =

- Village
- Location in Karnataka, India Benegal (India)
- Coordinates: 13.4472451°N 74.8089229°E
- Country: India
- State: Karnataka
- District: Udupi
- Elevation: 33 m (108 ft)

Languages
  - Spoken: Kannada, Konkani, Tulu
- Time zone: UTC+5:30 (IST)
- Telephone code: 0820

Benegal is a village in Brahmavar taluk of Udupi District of Karnataka State in India.

== History ==
=== Ancient and Medieval Era (Alupa Dynasty) ===
From around the 3rd century to the 15th century, the region encompassing Benegal was part of the Barkur Rajya, one of the two main administrative divisions of the Alupa dynasty (the other being Mangalore).

Maritime Trade: Due to its proximity to the Seetha River, the Varahi River and the Arabian Sea, villages like Benegal were integral to the agrarian economy that supplied rice and coconut to the bustling ports of Barkur and Hangarkatte.

Inscriptions: The area is known for several hero stones (Veeragallu) and inscriptions from the 10th to 14th centuries, which detail land grants to local temples and the bravery of local chieftains defending against coastal raids.

=== The Vijayanagara and Keladi Periods ===
Following the decline of the Alupas in the 15th century, the region came under the Vijayanagara Empire. Benegal was part of the strategic "Barakuru Rajya."

Keladi Consolidation: In the 16th century, the Keladi Nayakas (specifically Sadasiva Nayaka and Hiriya Venkatappa Nayaka) consolidated their hold over the Kanara coast.

The Pepper Trade: Benegal, being in the fertile belt between the coast and the Malnad foothills, contributed to the production of high-quality Black pepper and areca nut, which the Keladi rulers traded with the Portuguese East India Company and later the Dutch East India Company.

Religious Patronage: During this era, many local shrines and Basadis (Jain temples) in the vicinity received state patronage, reflecting the pluralistic religious culture of the Keladi kings.

=== Modern Era: British and Post-Independence ===
In 1799, after the Fourth Anglo-Mysore War and the death of Tipu Sultan, the region was annexed by the British East India Company. Benegal became part of the South Canara (Kanara) district under the Madras Presidency. In 1956, during the Reorganization of States, the village became part of the Mysore State (now Karnataka).

== Notable people ==
- Benegal Rama Rau - Fourth Governor of the Reserve Bank of India
- B. N. Rau - Indian civil servant, jurist, diplomat and statesman known for his key role in drafting the Constitution of India
- B. Shiva Rao - A member of the Constituent Assembly of India and an elected representative of the South Kanara constituency in the First Lok Sabha
- Shyam Benegal (1934–2024) - Indian film director, scriptwriter and documentary filmmaker
- Ramesh Sakharam Benegal - Tokyo Boy of Azad Hind Fauj. MVC, Indian Air Force.
