= Nakajima Ki-12 =

Japanese fighter prototype

Ki-12

General information
- Type: prototype fighter aircraft
- Manufacturer: Nakajima Aircraft Company
- Primary user: IJA Air Force

History
- First flight: 1936

The Nakajima Ki-12 (中島 キ12, Ki-jyuni) was a private development Nakajima Aircraft Company after its failure to meet the 1935 requirement issued by the Japanese government for a modern single-seat monoplane fighter with the Ki-11 design.

== Design & Development ==
Design work on the Ki-12 was a collaboration between engineers Roger Robert and Jean Beziaud from the French Dewoitine firm and Shigenobu Mori, a Nakajima engineer, and was heavily influenced by the Dewoitine D.510 design. Nakajima wanted the new design to be the most technically advanced in Japan. Based on the Ki-11 airframe, the engine was replaced by a liquid-cooled 454 kW (610 hp) Hispano-Suiza 12Xcrs V engine. The landing gear were fully retractable (the first Japanese design to have this feature), and the design introduced the use of slotted flaps. Proposed armament consisted of a 20 mm cannon firing from between the engine cylinders and twin 7.7 mm (.303 in) machine guns.

The Ki-12 was tested against the Mitsubishi Ki-18. Although technically advanced and with advantages in speed, range and firepower over the other contemporary Japanese fighter designs, the Ki-12 was deemed too heavy and complex by the Imperial Japanese Army Air Force. The IJAAF also felt that the design was lacking in maneuverability, and would not want to rely on the manufacturing licence for the Hispano-Suiza engine.

Although the Army declined to pursue the project, Nakajima continued to refine the design, introducing a simpler version styled the Nakajima Type P.E., which evolved into the successful Ki-27 "Nate" several years later.

== Variants ==
- Nakajima Ki-12: initial prototype
- Nakajima Type P.E.: simplified prototype with a fixed landing gear and a radial engine

== Specifications (Ki-12) ==
Data from Famous Airplanes of the World, first series, #76: Army Experimental Fighters (1)

General characteristics

- Crew: 1
- Length: 8.3 m (27 ft 3.75 in)
- Wingspan: 11 m (36 ft 1 in)
- Height: 3.45 m (11 ft 3.8 in)
- Wing area: 17 m^{2} (183 sq ft)
- Empty weight: 1,400 kg (3,086 lb)
- Gross weight: 1,900 kg (4,189 lb)
- Powerplant: 1 × Hispano-Suiza 12Xcrs water-cooled engine , 450 kW (610 hp)

Performance

- Maximum speed: 480 km/h (300 mph, 260 kn)
- Range: 800 km (500 mi, 430 nmi)
- Service ceiling: 10,500 m (34,000 ft)

Armament

- 1× 20 mm cannon
- 2× 7.7 mm (.303 in) Type 89 machine guns

== See also ==
Aircraft of comparable role, configuration, and era

- Dewoitine D.510

Related lists

- List of military aircraft of Japan
