= Japanese ranks and insignia during World War II =

Japanese ranks and insignia during World War II are listed on the following pages:

- Ranks of the Imperial Japanese Army
- Ranks of the Imperial Japanese Navy
