= Bukochosho =

Bukōkishō
- Bukōshō A-Class or First Class medal
- Native name: 陸軍武功徽章
- Type: Two-class military award
- Awarded for: Supreme valor in battle
- Country: Empire of Japan
- Presented by: Rikugun-Shōshō, divisional commander
- Eligibility: Military personnel only
- Campaigns: Second Sino-Japanese War; Pacific War
- Status: No longer awarded
- Established: 7 December 1944

Highlights
- Total: 89

The Rikugun Bukōkishō (陸軍武功徽章, "Badge for Military Merit"), commonly called the Bukōshō, was a military decoration of the Empire of Japan, established on 7 December 1944 by Imperial edict. It was awarded by the Imperial Japanese Army (IJA) to living soldiers who had performed with exceptional valor in battle. Airmen, especially fighter pilots defending Japan against enemy bombers, were most likely to win the award. Eighty-nine Bukōshō were awarded during the eight months it was actively awarded.

== Background ==
The Order of the Golden Kite had served for decades as an auspicious military award of the Japanese armed forces, and was the only Japanese order that was solely awarded to the military (the Order of the Rising Sun and the Order of the Sacred Treasure could also be awarded to civilians). However, the process by which Order of the Golden Kite was awarded was very lengthy: it was indeed awarded to military men who had died in service, while the remainder were normally awarded only after the end of a war, for services throughout the conflict. As the Second World War dragged on, it became apparent that there was a need to promote morale among active army units by rewarding acts of valor more readily. To this end, the IJA suggested the Bukōchōshō as an alternate decoration for living recipients who had shown the highest valor in combat, to be awarded much more quickly by division commanders in the field. Emperor Hirohito established the award on 7 December 1944, the third anniversary of the attacks on Hong Kong and Pearl Harbor, which had signaled the start of the broader Pacific War.

== Award ==
The Bukōshō (as it was popularly known) was presented in two classes, called A and B, or First and Second. Loosely resembling the Iron Cross 1st Class, the Bukōshō was a pin back badge, cast in iron or steel, featuring two shields (in gilt for A-Class, bronzed for B-Class) forming a cross, with a gilt banner at the center bearing the two kanji characters "Bukō" (Military Merit). The reverse side (again in gilt for A-Class, bronzed for B-Class) bore the six kanji characters in two columns "Rikugun/Bukōchōshō" (Army/Badge for Military Merit). Both classes were the same size: 50 mm (2.0 in) high and 40 mm (1.6 in) wide.

The Bukōshō was allowed to be given retroactively to soldiers who had distinguished themselves as far back as 1941 or perhaps 1940. In practice, the award was given disproportionately to fighter pilots flying against the American Boeing B-29 Superfortresses bombing the Japanese homeland. The first three men to win the award were Toru Shinomiya, Masao Itagaki and Matsumi Nakano—pilots flying the Kawasaki Ki-61 Hien fighter known by the Allies as the "Tony". On 3 December 1944, the three men were successful in very risky aerial ramming attacks. Another pilot, Masao Itagaki, successfully rammed B-29s on two occasions to earn two Bukōshō. Unusually, the IJA awarded the Bukōshō to at least one aviator of the Imperial Japanese Navy, for valiant action in the Battle of the Philippine Sea on 19–20 June 1944.

== Selected recipients ==
=== First or A-class ===
- Tadao Sumi, fighter pilot

=== Second or B-class ===
- Isamu Kashiide, fighter pilot
- Isamu Sasaki, fighter pilot
- Yojiro Ohbusa, fighter pilot

=== Unknown class ===
- Toru Shinomiya, fighter pilot
- Masao Itagaki, fighter pilot
- Matsumi Nakano, fighter pilot
- Kuniyoshi Tanaka, fighter pilot
- Satohide Kohatsu, fighter pilot
- Yoshio Yoshida, fighter pilot
- Tohru Shinomiya, fighter pilot
- Sadamitsu Kimura, fighter pilot
- Shigeyasu Miyamoto, fighter pilot
- Kenji Fujimoto, fighter pilot
- Teruhiko Kobayashi, fighter pilot
- Chuichi Ichikawa, fighter pilot
- Takashi Nakai, fighter pilot
- Tomojiro Ogawa, fighter pilot
- Makoto Ogawa, fighter pilot
- Yasushi Miyamotobayashi, fighter pilot
- Isamu Hoya, fighter pilot
- Totaro Ito, fighter pilot
- Koki Kawamoto, fighter pilot
- Mitsuo Oyake, fighter pilot
- Naoyuki Ogata, fighter pilot
- Sergeant-Major Kobayashi, Battle of Mindanao
- First Lieutenant Oki, Battle of Mindanao
- Commander Terao Kisaemon, Battle of Mindanao

== See also ==
- Distinguished Service Cross (United States)
- Knight's Cross of the Iron Cross (Germany)
- Médaille militaire (France)
- Medal "For Courage" (USSR)
- Medal of Military Valor (Italy)
- Order of Loyalty and Valour (Republic of China)
- Silver Star (United States)
- Victoria Cross (United Kingdom & Commonwealth Realms)
