= Yoshio Yoshida (pilot) =

- 吉田 好雄
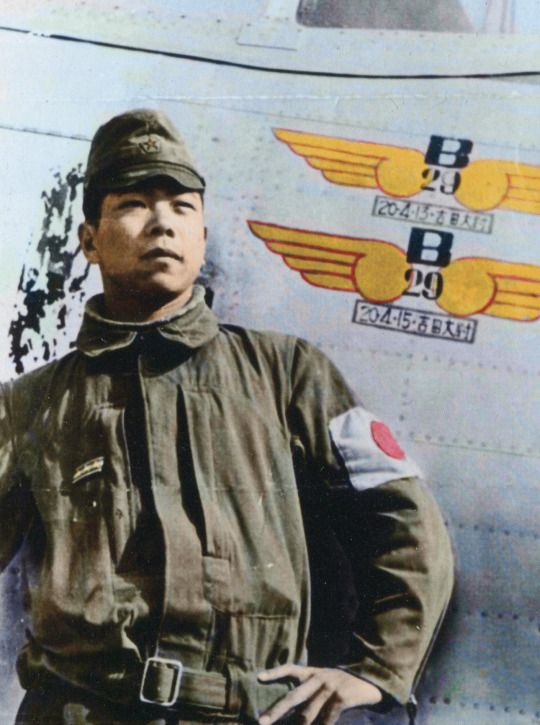
- Captain Yoshio Yoshida standing next to the Nakajima Ki-44 in which he scored his first two confirmed kills against Boeing B-29 Superfortress bombers. The two kills are marked on the side of the fighter aircraft.
- Born: 1921; Hiroshima, Hiroshima Prefecture, Japan
- Died: September 7th 1976
- Military career
- Allegiance: Empire of Japan
- Branch: Imperial Japanese Army
- Service years: 1939–45
- Rank: Captain
- Conflicts: Second Sino-Japanese War; World War II; Pacific War

Yoshio Yoshida (吉田 好雄, Yoshida Yoshio; 1921 – before 2000) was a Japanese army aviator known for achieving flying ace status against Boeing B-29 Superfortresses. Among pilots in his air group, the 70th Sentai, Yoshida downed the second-highest number of B-29s: six confirmed and one probable. He was awarded the Bukosho, the highest award given by the Imperial Japanese Army to soldiers who demonstrated (and survived) exceptionally valorous action in combat.

== Career ==
In 1921, Yoshida was born in Hiroshima, the capital of Hiroshima Prefecture. In 1939, he enrolled as an officer candidate in the 55th class of the Imperial Japanese Army Air Force Academy northwest of Tokyo. He completed his studies in March 1942 and was directed to the Akeno Fighter School to learn advanced fighter techniques. After this he was assigned to the 70th Sentai, flying the Nakajima Ki-44 Shōki, called "Tojo" by the Allies of World War II.

On 29 July 1944, American XX Bomber Command attacked Japanese military forces in Anshan, Manchuria, with 96 very heavy bombers. In August, Yoshida's air group moved to the Anshan area to provide air defense, flying the uprated Ki-44-II, with four larger 12.7 mm (.5 in) machine guns and a more powerful engine. On 8 September, 108 of the B-29s returned. The 70th Sentai rose to meet them and First Lieutenant Yoshida claimed one probable.

American B-29 groups were next directed to bomb Japan itself, so to counter the attacks the 70th Sentai was transferred in November 1944 to Kashiwa, Chiba, northeast of Tokyo. The fighter pilots were given newer 20 mm Ho-5 cannon-equipped Nakajima Ki-84 machines, called "Frank" by the Allies. In February, Captain Yoshida was made the leader of 3rd Chutai; a position he held until the end of the war in August 1945. He brought to his squadron an aggressive determination to score against the B-29s; on 13 April and again on 15 April he shot down a B-29 in night actions. He scored against four more in the following six weeks—all at night. Yoshida was awarded the Bukosho, his citation mentioning the bravery of the September 1944 action in the obsolescent Ki-44.

In the summer of 1945, Yoshida underwent testing to see if he was physically fit enough to fly the rocket-powered Mitsubishi J8M Shūsui, Japan's copy of the German Messerschmitt Me 163 Komet. The war ended before he was able to fly one of these aircraft.
