= No. 106 Squadron IAF =

No. 106 Squadron Lynxes
- Insignia of The No. 106 Squadron IAF "Lynxes"
- Active: 11 December 1959 — December 2013; January 2014 — Present
- Country: India Republic of India
- Allegiance: Indian Armed Forces
- Branch: Indian Air Force
- Role: Fighter
- Base: AFS Tezpur
- Nickname: "Lynxes"
- Mottos: Sarva Peshayami; I see everything
- Engagements: 1959 Canberra shootdown Western Air War, 1965; Liberation War, 1971; Operation Vijay

Aircraft flown
- Fighter: Su-30MKI

No. 106 Squadron IAF nicknamed as Lynxes is a squadron of the Indian Air Force. It was raised on 1 May 1957 with eight newly inducted PR.57 English Electric Canberras in the strategic photo-reconnaissance role. Initially positioned at Bareilly, later the squadron moved to Agra. When the Canberras were retired in 2007, the squadron was equipped with Hawker Siddeley HS 748 ("Avros"). The motto of the squadron is "Sarva Peshayami".

No. 106 Squadron was first formed briefly in 1942, seemingly from a coastal defence flight. On 30 April 1942, Air HQ India Order No./1/4/10/Org dated 1 April 1942 arrived, redesignated Indian Air Force Volunteer Reserve flights as squadrons. The briefly formed 104 Squadron IAF was disbanded in November 1942, thus it seems likely that No. 106 Squadron was also disbanded at this time.

== History ==
The squadron was with Assam Regiment and Arunachal Scouts of Indian Army in January 2021.

== Operational history of Canberras ==
Of the eight Canberras provided on raising, three aircraft (IP 986 to 988) were transferred from the Royal Air Force while five, serials IP 989 to 993, were specifically manufactured for the IAF. Of the original eight, one Canberra, IP 988, was shot down on 10 April 1959, when it reportedly strayed into Pakistani airspace. One Canberra (IP 987) was transferred from the IAF to the National Remote Sensing Agency. To make up for these two deficiencies, the IAF obtained two more refurbished PR 57 aircraft in 1963 (BP 745 and 746). In 1971, the IAF imported two PR 67s (P 1098 and 1099), an improved version.

In the 1971 Indo-Pakistani War, 106 Squadron Canberras were involved in a number of photo-reconnaissance missions which were strategic in nature. The squadron was led by Wing Commander Ramesh Sakharam Benegal, a former Tokyo Boy. Unconfirmed reports about Chinese men and materiel moving into Pakistan by the Karakorum Highway in mid-winter resulted in a Canberra reconnaissance mission on 6 December 1971 which refuted the report. The Canberras flew a sortie on 8 December 1971 to Longewala to confirm the outcome. This produced a notable photograph of crossed and inter-twined tracks of the Pakistani armour as they manoeuvered to avoid destruction by the Hunters of the Operational Training Unit. On 10 Dec 1971, a reconnaissance sortie was flown to Gwadar, to check whether the Pakistan Navy had located any assets there to avoid the blockade of Karachi, which did not prove to be the case.

The squadron also made a number of sorties over East Pakistan. 106 Squadron Canberras photographed avenues for the advance of Indian columns from various directions. Photo-reconnaissance was done of prospective drop zones for the parachute drop of the 2nd Battalion, the Parachute Regiment from which Tangail was selected. The Indian Navy requested photo-reconnaissance of Chittagong airfield and harbour, Cox's Bazar airfield which was provided. The squadron flew number of missions over enemy airfields, namely Ishurdi, Jessore, Kurmitola and Tejgaon airfields.

While the standard Canberra bomber squadron of the IAF had 16 Canberra bombers and two trainers, for the early part of its service, 106 squadron had only five photo-reconnaissance aircraft and no trainers, with two additional refurbished aircraft being added in 1971. After the 1971 conflict, Wing Commander Benegal was awarded the Maha Vir Chakra while other pilots in the squadron were awarded four Vir Chakras, four Vayu Sena Medals and four commendation cards. For this reason it is considered one of the most highly decorated squadrons of the air force during the 1971 war.

In 1999, a Canberra, IP 990, on a low-level mission over Kargil during Operation Vijay, was hit by a Stinger missile. The missile destroyed the left engine and damaged the aircraft but the pilots, Wing Commander Perumal and Flight Lieutenant Jha, landed the aircraft safely at a nearby air base. Wing Commander Perumal was awarded the Shaurya Chakra.

On 19 December 2005, the same aircraft suffered an engine failure forcing it to return to base, but crashed 5 kilometres (3.1 mi) short of the runway, killing both pilots.

One of the early commanding officers of No. 106 Squadron, Wing Commander Jaggi Nath, who was awarded a Maha Vir Chakra in both the 1965 and 1971 wars, said :

“106 Squadron (with the Canberra PR.57/PR.67) was not just an Air Force asset, it was a national asset”.

== Aircraft ==
Aircraft types operated by 106 Squadron
Aircraft type	From	To	Air base
Canberra PR.57	January 1960	July 2007	AFS Agra
Dakota C47	January 1960	February 1978	
Hawker HS 748	February 1978	N/A	
Su-30 MKI	January 2014	Present	AFS Tezpur
