= Makoto Ogawa (pilot) =

Japanese Army aviator (born 1917)

- 小川 誠
- Makoto Ogawa stands next to his fighter aircraft marked with two stylized eagles, indicating his first two aerial victories, in 1945
- Born: February 1917; Shizuoka Prefecture, Japan
- Military career
- Allegiance: Imperial Japanese Army
- Service years: 1935–45
- Rank: Second Lieutenant
- Conflicts: Second Sino-Japanese War; World War II; Pacific War

Makoto Ogawa (小川 誠, Ogawa Makoto; born February 1917) was a Japanese Army aviator known for achieving flying ace status against Boeing B-29 Superfortresses during World War II. In carrying out his duties, he downed the highest number of B-29s among the pilots in his air group—seven confirmed—and also two North American P-51 Mustangs. He was awarded the Bukosho, the highest award given by the Imperial Japanese Army to living soldiers who demonstrated exceptionally valorous action in combat.

== Career ==
Ogawa was born in 1917 in Shizuoka Prefecture. He enlisted in the army when he was 18 and was assigned to the 7th Air Regiment based at Hamamatsu Airfield located north of the city of Hamamatsu in his home prefecture. After a few years, he enrolled in the Kumagaya Army Flying School to learn to fly fighters. In August 1938 he graduated as a member of the 72nd class of students. Instead of being posted to a combat squadron in China, he was kept at the school as an assistant instructor.

Toward the end of 1941, Ogawa was sent to Manchuria to fly with the 70th Sentai, a fighter wing outfitted with the Nakajima Ki-44 Shōki, called "Tojo" by the Allies. He flew for three years and gained a high level of skill in piloting fighters. By then, American heavy bombers had begun to bomb Japan itself, so to counter the attacks the 70th Sentai was transferred, in November 1944, to Kashiwa, Chiba, northeast of Tokyo. For this task, the fighter pilots were given newer 20 mm Ho-5 cannon-equipped Nakajima Ki-84 machines, called "Frank" by the Allies.

Ogawa found that the B-29s were more vulnerable when they were maintaining level flight in their bombing runs and could not employ evasive maneuvers. Exploiting this weakness during night actions, he shot two of the bombers down by frontal attack, firing at the nose. He continued with his aerial successes and by August 1945 when the war ended, he had built up a confirmed score of seven B-29 bombers downed, as well as two P-51 Mustang fighters. This made him the highest scoring pilot against B-29s in the 70th Sentai, his air group. By the order of General Shizuichi Tanaka, on 9 July 1945 Ogawa was awarded the Bukosho, the highest military honor given to living IJA personnel during World War II. At the same time he was commissioned as an officer with the rank of second lieutenant.

After the war Ogawa became a businessman and lived in Tokyo.
