= Nakajima Ki-27 =

Japanese fighter aircraft

Ki-27
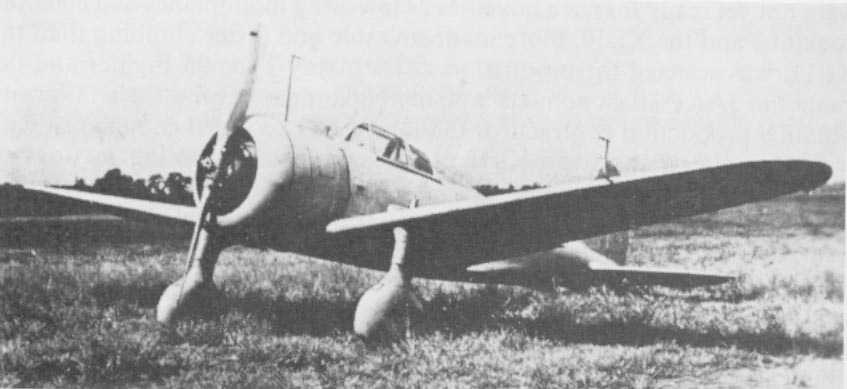
- Nakajima Ki-27

General information
- Type: Fighter aircraft
- National origin: Japan
- Manufacturer: Nakajima Aircraft Company
- Primary users: Imperial Japanese Army Air Service Manchukuo Air Force; Royal Thai Air Force; Republic of China Air Force
- Number built: 3,368

History
- Introduction date: 1937
- First flight: 15 October 1936
- Retired: 1945 (Japan)

The Nakajima Ki-27 (九七式戦闘機, Kyūnana-shiki sentōki; Type 97 Fighter) is a fighter aircraft designed and produced by the Japanese manufacturer Nakajima Aircraft Company. Its Allied nickname was "Nate", although it was called "Abdul" in the "China Burma India" (CBI) theater by many post-war sources; Allied Intelligence had reserved that name for the nonexistent Mitsubishi Navy Type 97 fighter, expected to be the successor to the carrier-borne Type 96 (Mitsubishi A5M) with retractable landing gear and an enclosed cockpit.

Derived from the Nakajima Type P.E, the Ki-27 was developed during the mid 1930s to replace the Kawasaki Ki-10 biplane fighter flown by the Imperial Japanese Army Air Service (IJAAS). Featuring a wire-braced monoplane configuration with an enclosed cockpit and a fixed undercarriage, the first prototype performed its maiden flight in 15 October 1936. While the Ki-27 prototypes demonstrated a lower maximum speed and inferior climb performance to competing aircraft (the Kawasaki Ki-28 and Mitsubishi Ki-33), Imperial Japanese Army (IJA) officials were impressed by its high rate of turn and thus selected the aircraft over its competition. Following some design modifications, including the fitting of enlarged wings, the Ki-27 entered quantity production in late 1937. To fulfil heavy demand for the type, it was produced not only by Nakajima but also by Tachikawa Aircraft Company Ltd and Manshukoku Hikoki Seizo KK.

The Ki-27 received the Army Type 97 Fighter designation and entered service with the IJAAS during 1937; the Ki-27 served as the primary fighter of the service up until 1940. The Ki 27 was commonly used to escort bombers, such as during Japan's attacks in Malaya, Singapore, Netherlands East Indies, Burma and the Philippines. Furthermore, the type was heavily used in the Chinese theatre, where it held air superiority until the Soviet's Polikarpov I-16 and the American Curtiss P-40 Warhawk fighters appeared in quantity early on in World War II. The type was replaced in front line IJAAS service by the Nakajima Ki-43, after which remaining aircraft were typically used as trainers. Several aircraft were also exported for use by the Manchukuo and Thai armed forces. In the final year of the conflict, several Ki-27 were equipped with up to 500 kg (1,100 lb) of explosives and used to conduct kamikaze attacks; the type was also used in often-costly attacks upon the advancing Allied forces prior to the Surrender of Japan.

== Design and development ==
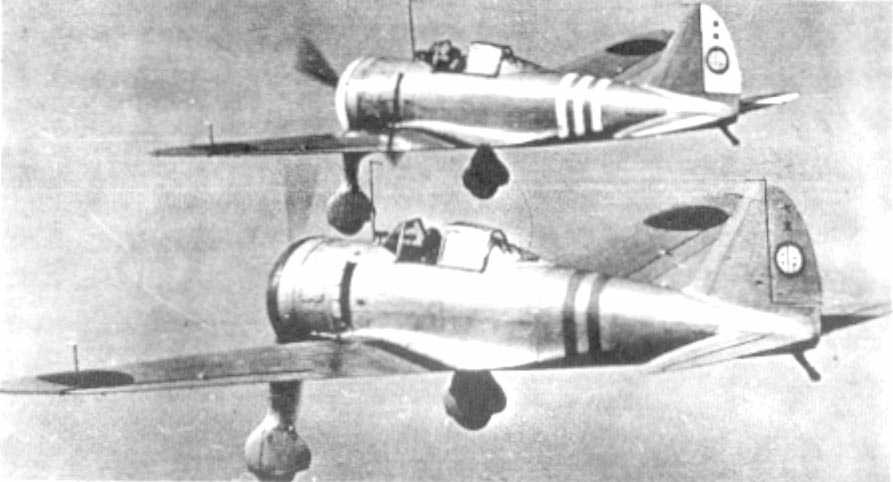
Nakajima Ki-27 of the Akeno Army Flying School, ca. winter 1941/42 (see Bueschel 1970)

The origins of the Ki-27 can be traced back to 1934 and the issuing of a specification by the Imperial Japanese Army (IJA) for a replacement to the Kawasaki KDA-5 (Army Type 92 Fighter) biplane. While this specification was ultimately fulfilled by the Kawasaki Ki-10 (Army Type 95 Fighter), which would be the IJA's final biplane fighter, it had motivated the Japanese aircraft manufacturer Nakajima to develop the competing Ki-11, a wire-braced monoplane with an enclosed cockpit. Despite the Ki-11 not being selected by the IJA for production, the test data gathered along with the speeds achieved convinced the company to persist with development of monoplane fighter aircraft, leading to the Nakajima Ki-12 and the Nakajima Type P.E.

In June 1935, the Koku Hombu (Note: Koku Hombu was the Technical Branch of the Imperial Army Air Headquarters.) issued instructions to Nakajima, Mitsubishi, and Kawasaki to design an advanced low-wing monoplane to replace the Kawasaki Ki-10 as well as to produce two prototypes. It was stipulated that this successor fighter would possess superior performance to the experimental Mitsubishi Ki-18. The competing submissions were the Kawasaki Ki-28 (a low-wing cantilever monoplane) and the Mitsubishi Ki-33 (a derivative of the company's existing A5M carrier-based fighter). The response produced by Nakajima was based on its existing Type P.E. effort, which was still in an early stage of development as a private venture when the company received the instruction. Accordingly, data gathered from the Type P.E. effort, which proceeded to the flight test phase in June 1936, was incorporated into the subsequent Ki-27. This work, led by Koyama Yasushi, included the adoption of an air-cooled radial engine and a simplified fixed landing gear arrangement. It possessed an atypically light structure that, in combination with a new internally-developed aerofoil, gave the Ki-27 considerable manoeuvrability.

On 15 October 1936, the prototype Ki-27 performed its maiden flight at Ojima Airfield; two months later, it was followed by a second prototype that was equipped with a slightly enlarged wing. Following a brief series of manufacturer's trials, both aircraft were delivered to the IJA's Aerotechnical Research Institute at Tachikawa, where they were competitively flown against both the Ki-28 and the Mitsubishi Ki-33 (a revised version of the A5M). During these trials, the Ki-27 reportedly attained a maximum speed of 468 kmph. Although the aircraft demonstrated a slower top speed and inferior climb performance to its competitors, the IJA opted for the Ki-27, largely due to its outstanding turning ability, which had been partially achieved via its remarkably low wing loading. The IJA promptly ordered 8 pre-production samples (Ki-27a) for further testing. Built between June and December 1937, these aircraft differed minorly from the original prototypes, featured a modified canopy and larger wings. Featuring a straight leading edge and tapered trailing edge, the aircraft's wing design would become a staple design feature across Nakajima's aircraft; specifically, it would be subsequently used on the Ki-43, Ki-44, and Ki-84.

Testing concluded in late 1937, after which the Ki-27 was officially accepted into service as the Army Type 97 Fighter. In addition to Nakajima's own production line, the Ki-27 was also manufactured by Tachikawa Aircraft Company Ltd and Manshukoku Hikoki Seizo KK; a total of 3,368 aircraft were completed before production ceased in 1942.

In 1940, amid troubles with the development of the Nakajima Ki-43 Hayabusa, work was undertaken on a refined version of the Ki-27 as a potential fall-back option. Referred to as the Ki-27 KAI, two prototypes were built and demonstrated a reduced wing loading along with a higher top speed, but work was discontinued as the Ki-43 programme proceeded.

== Operational history ==
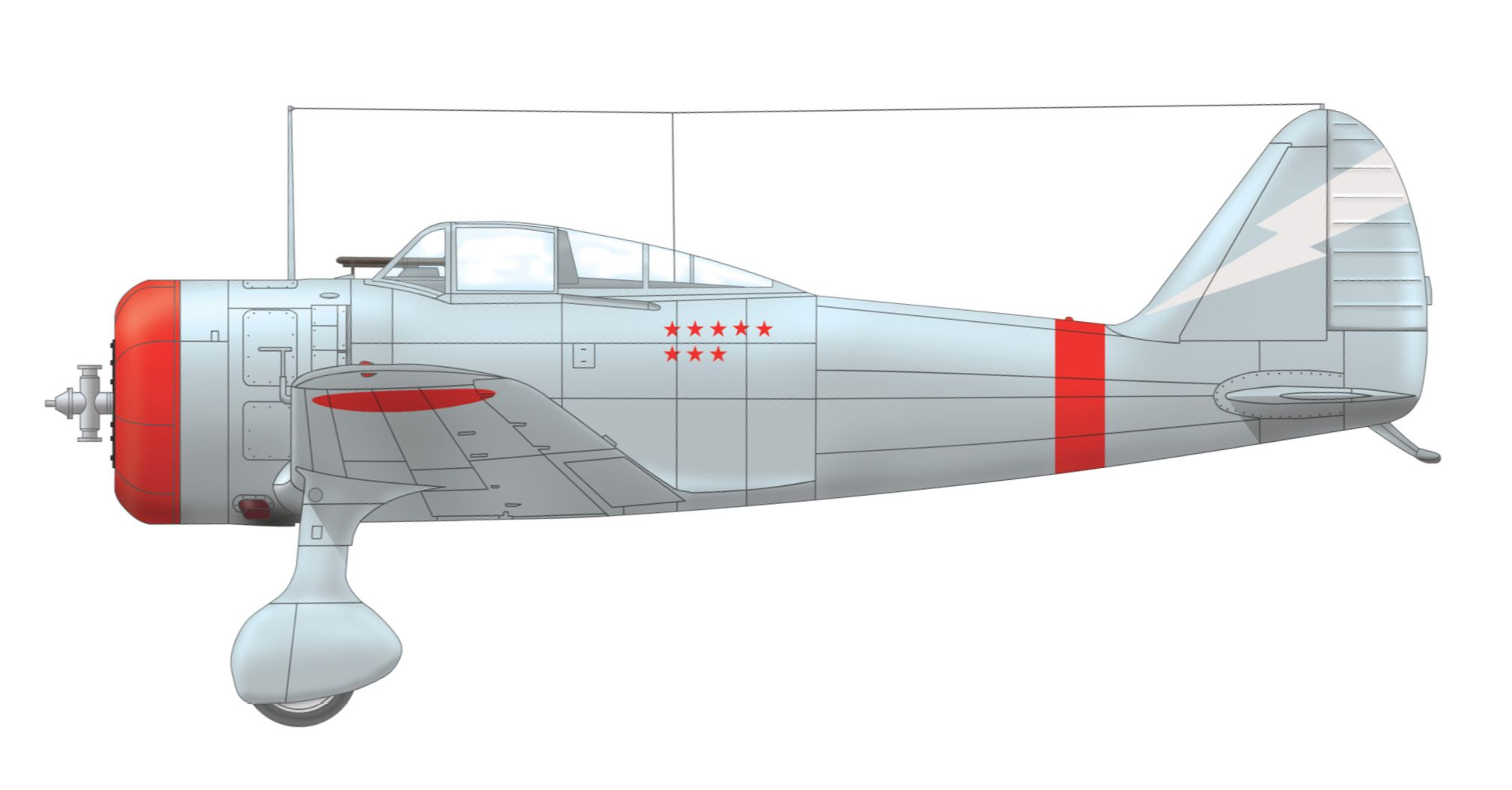
Nakajima Ki-27b of Kenji Shimada, commander of the 1st Chutai of the 11th Sentai, Battle of Khalkhyn Gol June 1939

Entering service in late 1937, the Ki-27 became the primary fighter of the Imperial Japanese Army Air Force (IJAAS); it remained in this capacity until shortly after Japan's entry into World War II.

In March 1938, the Ki-27 performed live combat operations over northern China, where it quickly took air superiority from the Chinese forces. Shortly following its arrival, the IJAAS opted to reorganise its units, switching from using mixed divisions towards specialist fighter units instead, the first of which, the 59th Sight Sentai (equipped with Ki-27s) was stood up on 1 July 1938. Over the Chinese theatre, the Ki-27 maintained Japanese control of the skies until the introduction of the faster Soviet-supplied Polikarpov I-16 fighter by the Chinese. During the 1939 Battle of Khalkhin Gol against the USSR in Mongolia, the Ki-27 faced both Polikarpov I-15 biplane and Polikarpov I-16 monoplane fighters.

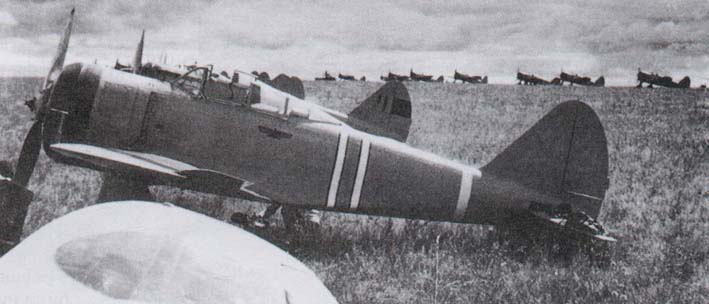
A Ki-27 as used in the Battle of Khalkhin Gol.

While the Ki-27's performance was a considered to be a match for the early model I-16s, and was considerably superior to the I-15 biplane, the IJAAS achieved aerial superiority through the superior trained of its Ki-27 pilots. The Ki-27 was armed with two 7.7 mm (.303 in) Type 89 machine guns and, as with most aircraft of the period, lacked armor protection for the pilot and self-sealing or fire suppression in the fuel tanks. However, the introduction of improved I-16s, which were faster and more heavily armed (with twin wing-mounted 20mm ShVAK cannon) and armored, effectively nullified the Ki-27's advantages. Furthermore, the I-16 could now escape from the Ki-27 in a dive. The VVS introduced new tactics consisting of flying in large tightly knit formations, attacking with altitude and/or speed advantage and hit-and-run (high-energy) tactics much as Claire Chennault would later formulate for the 1941-era Flying Tigers (likewise to fly against Japanese forces).

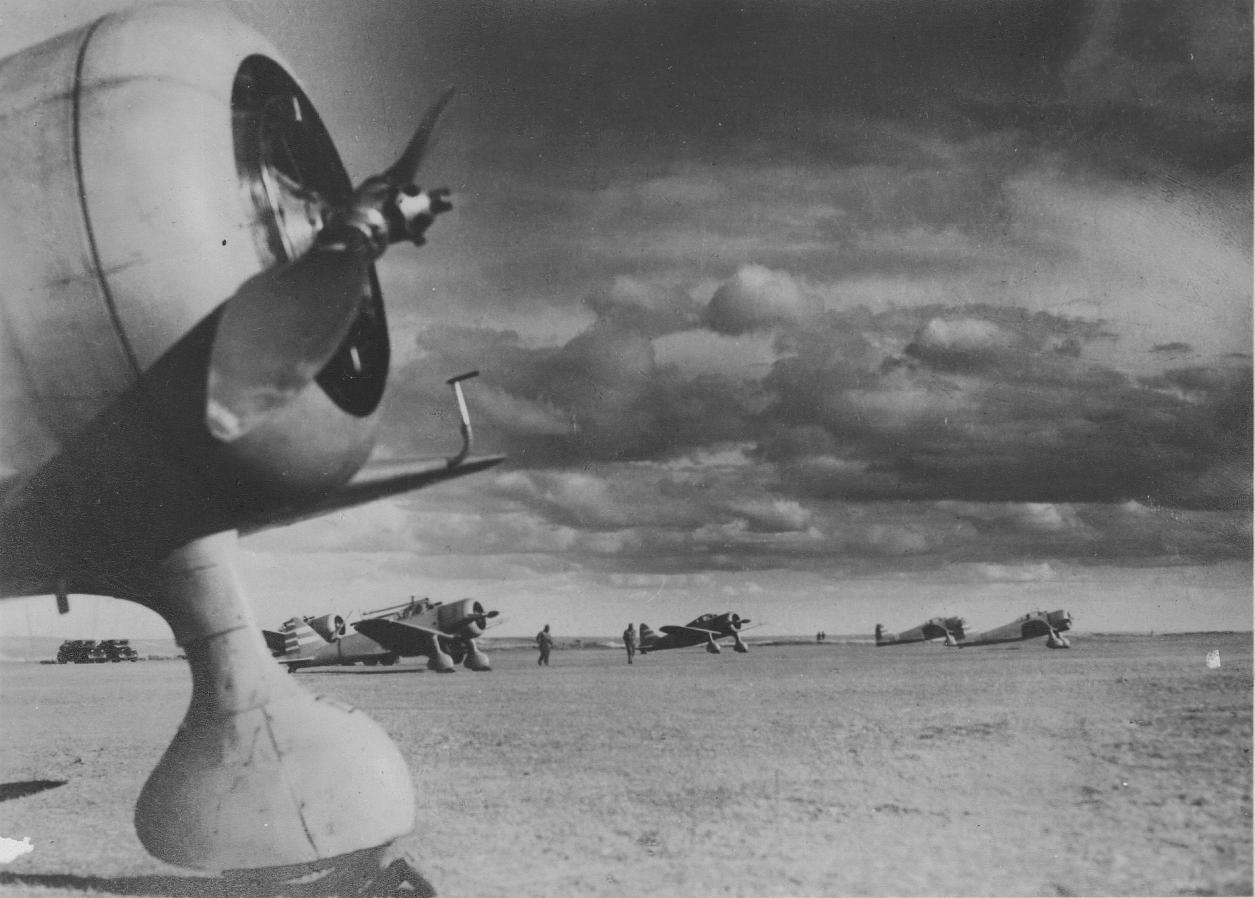
Ki-27s at Nomonhan, 1939

Japanese losses mounted but, despite this, they claimed 1,340 aircraft (six times the admitted Soviet losses and three times as many as Soviet aircraft admitted to being in the theatre). Japanese losses numbered 120 (including Ki-10s) while the Russians claimed 215 vs. a peak Japanese strength of 200 fighters. (Overclaiming remained commonplace through World War II, despite gun cameras and expert intelligence assessments.) Top scoring pilot of the incident and top scoring IJAAS pilot on the Ki-27 and overall World War II IJAAS ace was Warrant Officer Hiromichi Shinohara, who claimed 58 Soviet planes (including an IJAAS record of 11 in one day) whilst flying Ki-27s, only to be shot down himself by a number of I-16s on 27 August 1939.

The preference of Japanese fighter pilots for the Ki-27's high rate of turn caused the IJA to focus excessively on manoeuvrability, a decision which later handicapped the development of faster and more heavily armed fighters.

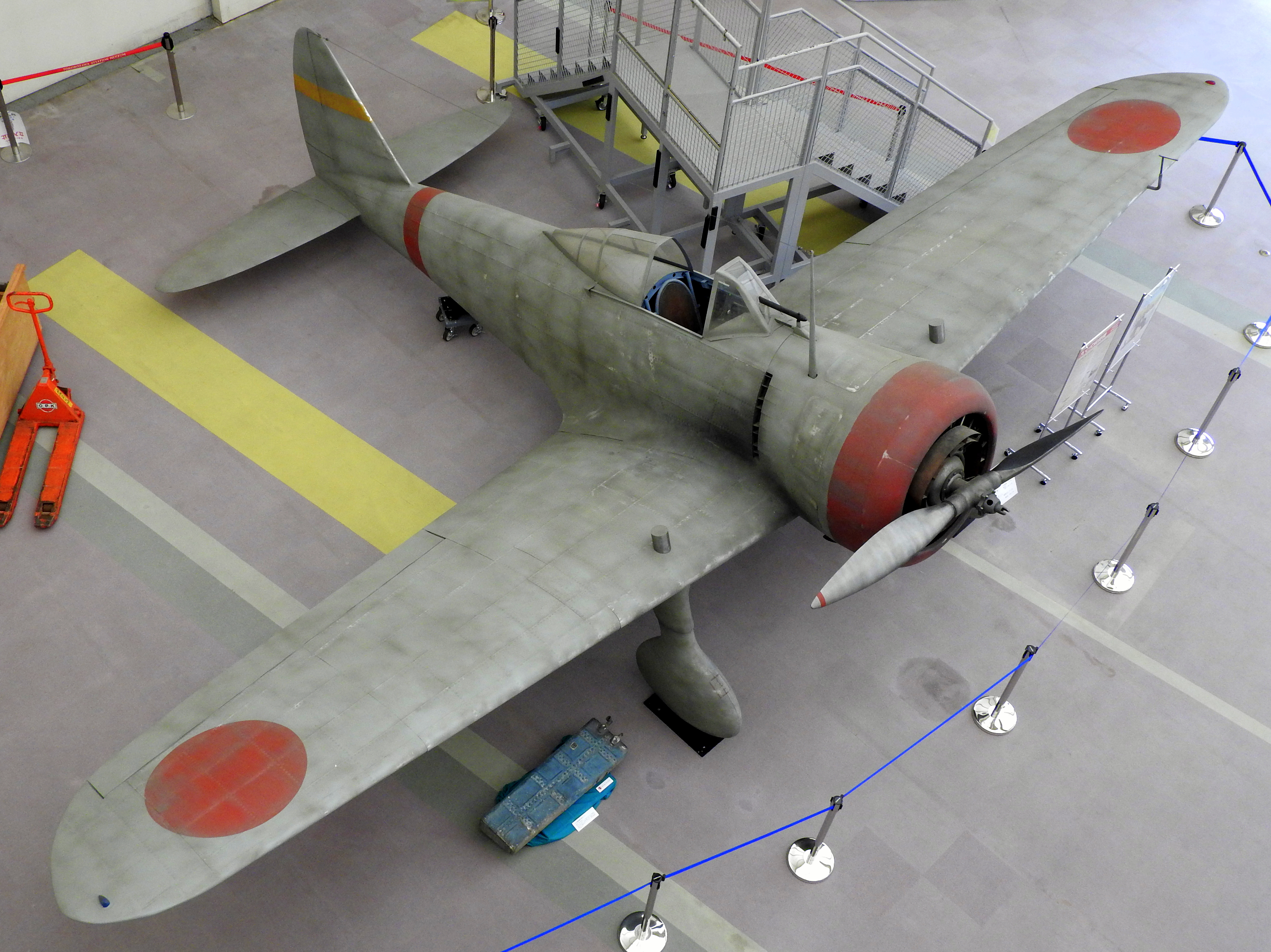
Ki-27 replica at Tokorozawa Aviation Museum

Upon the outbreak of World War II in the Pacific, the Ki-27 was deployed in heavy numbers, often to escort bomber formations during the Japanese attacks Malaya, Singapore, Netherlands East Indies, Burma and the Philippines (where it initially fared poorly against the Brewster F2A Buffalo). While the Ki-27 was approaching obsolescence by late 1941, it often emerged victorious against Allied aircraft around this time when attacking in superior numbers. The type also saw extensive action against the American Volunteer Group in the early months of the conflict. It was quickly outclassed during encounters with the American Curtiss P-40 Warhawk, which contributed to the Ki-27 being replaced in front line service by the Nakajima Ki-43. Up to 1943, the Ki-27 was commonly allocated to units based in the Japanese home islands, although such units were typically reequipped with newer types if they were to be deployed overseas. The type continued to serve in secondary capacities, particularly as advanced trainer aircraft; in the trainer role, the wheel spats were eliminated and the tailskid replaced by a tailwheel instead.

The Ki-27 was also exported for use with Manchukuo and Thai armed forces, seeing combat with both. In Thai service, Ki-27s reportedly damaged two North American P-51 Mustangs and shot down one Lockheed P-38 Lightning and one North American P-51 Mustang.

In the final months of the conflict, desperate lack of aircraft forced the Japanese to utilize all available machines, and the Ki-27 and 79 were no exception. Some were equipped with up to 500 kg (1,100 lb) of explosives for kamikaze attacks, while others were redeployed as fighters, suffering terrible losses. On 16 February 1945, the 39th Educational Flight Regiment scrambled 16 Ki-79 trainers from Yokoshiba Airfield to oppose a massive air raid from U.S. Task Force 58 carrier group, losing six aircraft with more damaged and five pilots killed - in return damaging at least one F6F Hellcat and possibly downing a second.

== Variants ==
Data from

Nakajima Army Type 97 Fighter
Long Army designation for the Ki-27

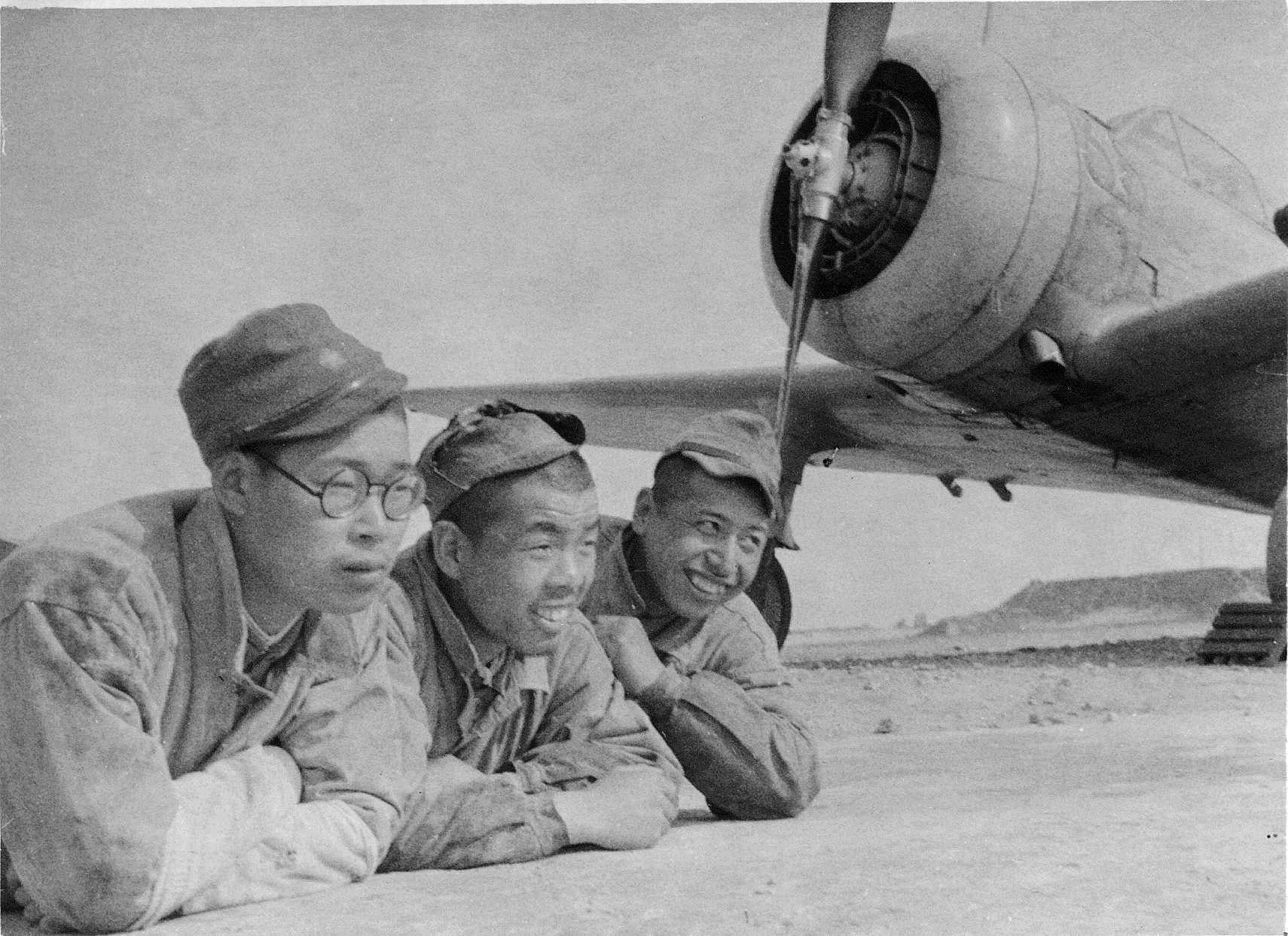
Japanese army personnel and their Ki-27s

Nakajima Type PE
Private-venture experimental aircraft with Nakajima Ha1a engine.
Nakajima Ki-27
Prototype version with armament in response to IJAAS specs, two aircraft built.
Nakajima Ki-27-Kai Prototype
Pre-production units with armament and heavier Nakajima Ha1b engine, 10 aircraft built.
Ki-27a
First production version. Approximately 565 aircraft built.
Ki-27a-Kai
Trainer version converted from existing production. Approximately 150 aircraft converted.
Ki-27b (Army Type 97b Fighter)
Improved canopy, oil cooler and provision for 4 × 25 kg (55 lb) bombs or fuel tanks under the wings. A total of 1,492 built, including 50 by Tachikawa Aircraft Company Ltd.
Ki-27b-Kai
Trainer version converted from existing production. Approximately 225 aircraft converted.
Nakajima Ki-27-Kai
Experimental lightened version developed as an interim solution when Ki-43 development was delayed, top speed 475 km/h (295 mph); two aircraft built).
Mansyū Ki-79
Trainer version, built by Manshūkoku Hikōki Seizo KK with a 510 hp Hitachi Ha.13a-I or Ha.13a-III engine. A total of 1,329 aircraft built in four sub-versions (The single seat Ki-79a (Ha.13a-I) and Ki-79c (Ha.13a-III) and the two-seat Ki-79b (Ha.13a-I) and Ki-79d (Ha.13a-III)).
Mansyū Army Type 2 Advanced Trainer
Long Army designation for the Mansyū Ki-79
B.Kh.12
(Thai: บ.ข.๑๒) Royal Thai Air Force designation for the Ki-27b.

== Operators ==
=== World War II ===
Japan

- Imperial Japanese Army Air Service
  - No. 2 Dokuritsu Hikō Daitai IJAAS
  - No. 9 Dokuritsu Hikō Chutai IJAAS
  - No. 10 Dokuritsu Hikō Chutai IJAAS
  - No. 84 Dokuritsu Hikō Chutai IJAAS
  - No. 102 Dokuritsu Hikō Chutai IJAAS
  - No. 1 Hikō Sentai IJAAS
  - No. 2 Hikō Sentai IJAAS
  - No. 4 Hikō Sentai IJAAS
  - No. 5 Hikō Sentai IJAAS
  - No. 9 Hikō Sentai IJAAS
  - No. 11 Hikō Sentai IJAAS
  - No. 13 Hikō Sentai IJAAS
  - No. 18 Hikō Sentai IJAAS
  - No. 21 Hikō Sentai IJAAS
  - No. 24 Hikō Sentai IJAAS
  - No. 26 Hikō Sentai IJAAS
  - No. 29 Hikō Sentai IJAAS
  - No. 30 Hikō Sentai IJAAS
  - No. 33 Hikō Sentai IJAAS
  - No. 48 Hikō Sentai IJAAS
  - No. 50 Hikō Sentai IJAAS
  - No. 54 Hikō Sentai IJAAS
  - No. 59 Hikō Sentai IJAAS
  - No. 63 Hikō Sentai IJAAS
  - No. 64 Hikō Sentai IJAAS
  - No. 68 Hikō Sentai IJAAS
  - No. 70 Hikō Sentai IJAAS
  - No. 77 Hikō Sentai IJAAS
  - No. 78 Hikō Sentai IJAAS
  - No. 85 Hikō Sentai IJAAS
  - No. 87 Hikō Sentai IJAAS
  - No. 101 Hikō Sentai IJAAS
  - No. 144 Hikō Sentai IJAAS
  - No. 204 Hikō Sentai IJAAS
  - No. 206 Hikō Sentai IJAAS
  - No. 244 Hikō Sentai IJAAS
  - No. 246 Hikō Sentai IJAAS
  - No. 248 Hikō Sentai IJAAS
  - Rikugun Koukuu Shikan Gakkō
  - Tokorozawa Rikugun Koku Seibi Gakkō
  - Akeno Rikugun Hikō Gakkō
  - Kumagaya Rikugun Hikō Gakkō
  - Tachiarai Rikugun Hikō Gakkō

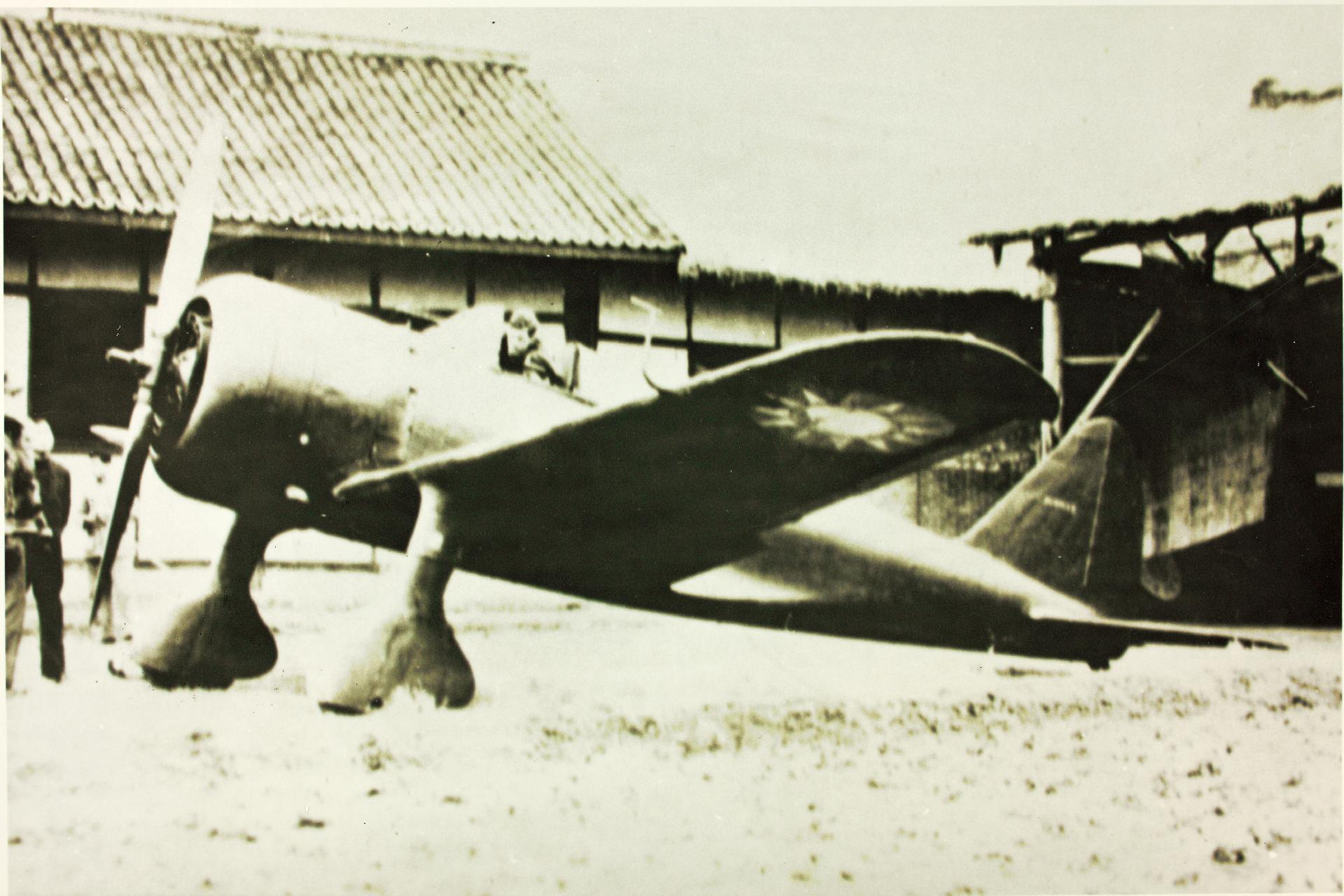
Ki-27 in ROCAF markings

Manchukuo

- Manchukuo Air Force

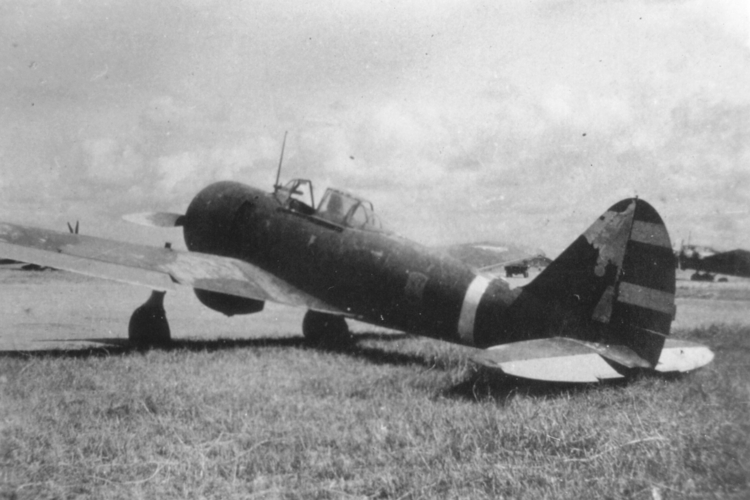
Ki-27 in RTAF

(Republic of China (1912–1949)) Reformed Government of the Republic of China

- Scheduled aircraft never delivered due to distrust of Chinese forces
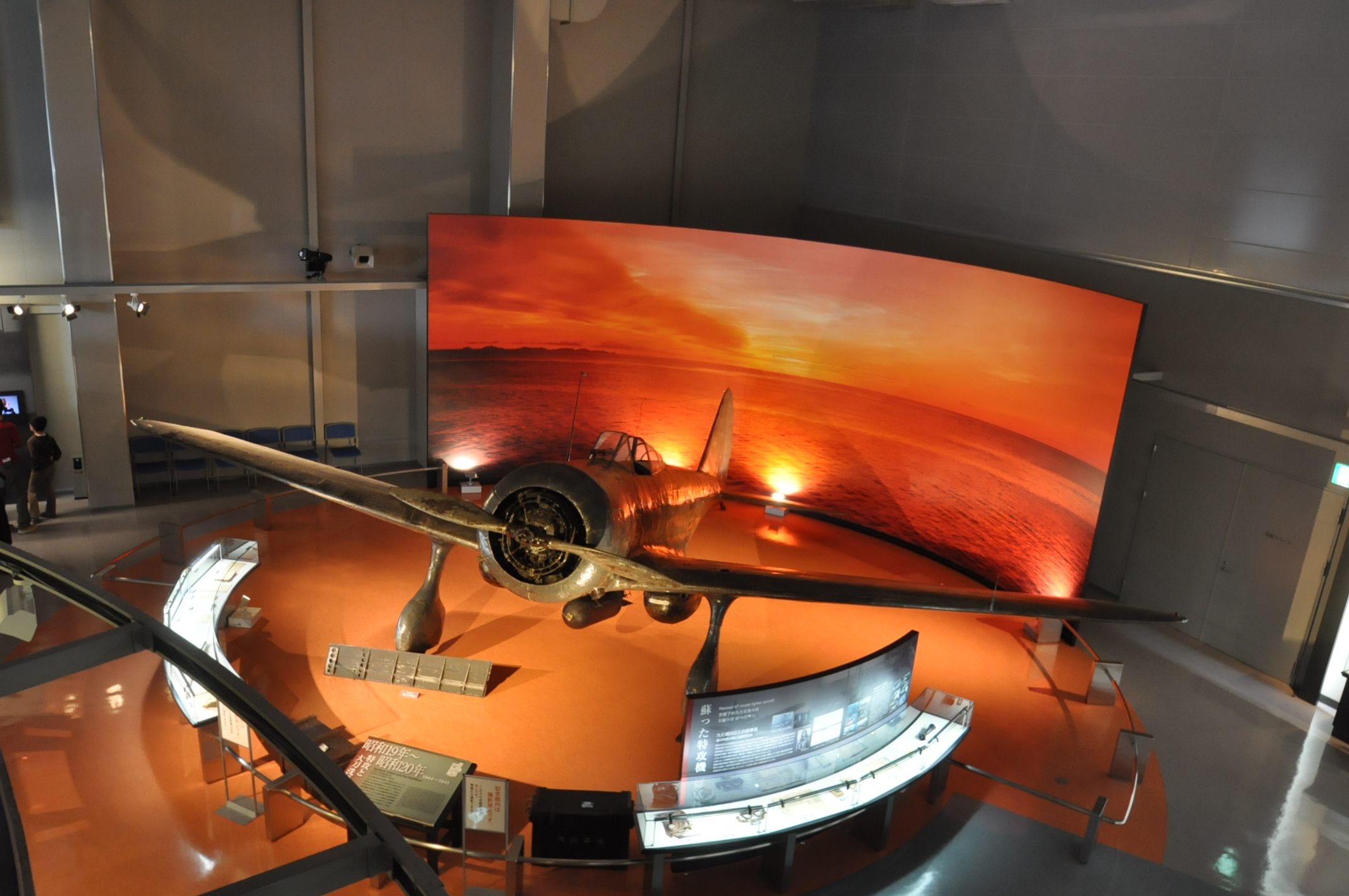
  A Nakajima Ki-27 in Tachiarai Peace Memorial Museum

Thailand

- Royal Thai Air Force
  - Foong Bin Khap Lai 15 (15 Fighter Squadron)
  - Foong Bin Khap Lai 16 (16 Fighter Squadron)

=== Post-War ===
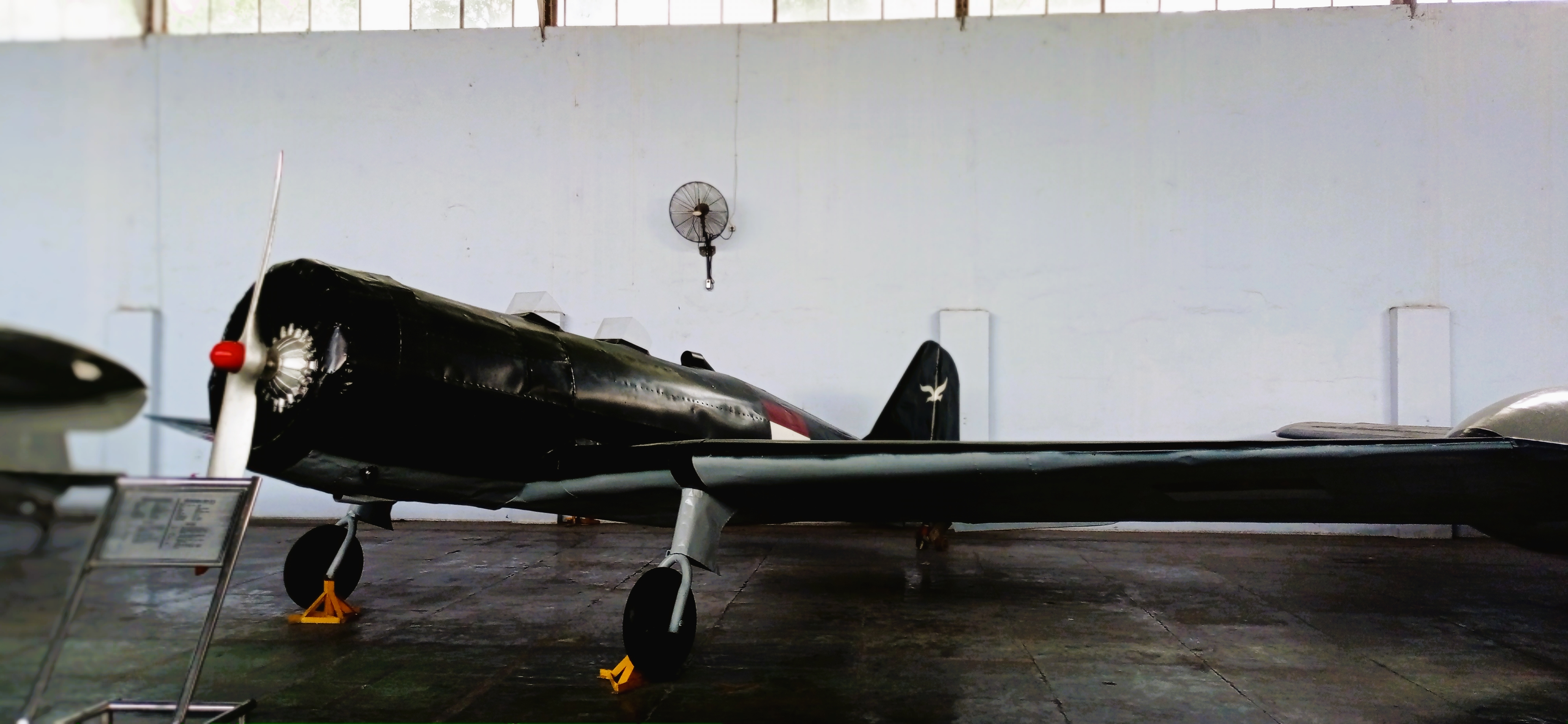
Mansyū Ki-79 in Museum Dirgantara Mandala

China

- People's Liberation Army Air Force

China

- Republic of China Air Force

Indonesia

- In 1945, Indonesian Air Force –then Indonesian People's Security Force (IPSF) (Indonesian pro-independence guerrillas)– captured a small number of aircraft at numerous Japanese air bases, including Bugis Air Base in Malang (repatriated 18 September 1945). Most aircraft were destroyed in military conflicts between the Netherlands and the newly proclaimed-Republic of Indonesia during the Indonesian National Revolution of 1945–1949.

== Surviving aircraft ==
Two aircraft survive today:

- One Ki-27 is preserved at the Tachiarai Peace Memorial Museum.
- One Mansyu Ki-79 is preserved at the Satria Mandala Armed Forces Museum, Jakarta, Indonesia.

== Specifications (Ki-27b) ==
3-view drawing of Nakajima Ki-27

Data from Nakajima Ki-27 Nate, Japanese Aircraft of the Pacific War

General characteristics

- Crew: One
- Length: 7.53 m (24 ft 8 in)
- Wingspan: 11.31 m (37 ft 1 in)
- Height: 3.25 m (10 ft 8 in)
- Wing area: 18.56 m^{2} (199.8 sq ft)
- Airfoil: root: NN-2 mod (16%); tip: NN-2 mod (8%)
- Empty weight: 1,110 kg (2,447 lb)
- Gross weight: 1,790 kg (3,946 lb)
- Powerplant: 1 × Nakajima Ha-1 Kotobuki Otsu (Ha-1b) nine-cylinder air-cooled radial piston engine, 530 kW (710 hp) for take-off, 582 kW (780 hp) at 2,900 m (9,500 ft)
- Propellers: 2-bladed variable-pitch propeller

Performance

- Maximum speed: 470 km/h (290 mph, 250 kn) at 3,500 m (11,500 ft)
- Cruise speed: 350 km/h (220 mph, 190 kn) at 3,500 m (11,500 ft)
- Range: 630 km (390 mi, 340 nmi)
- Ferry range: 1,710 km (1,060 mi, 920 nmi)
- Time to altitude: 5,000 m (16,000 ft) in five minutes and 22 seconds (3,056 fpm)
- Wing loading: 96.5 kg/m^{2} (19.8 lb/sq ft) Maximum weight
- Power/mass: 3.43 kg/kW (5.64 lb/hp) maximum

Armament

- Guns:

- 2 × 7.7 mm (0.303 in) Type 89 machine guns, 500 rounds/gun
- 1 × 12.7 mm (0.5 in) Ho-103 machine gun and 1 × 7.7 mm (0.303 in) machine gun on later models

- Bombs:

- 4 × 25 kg (55 lb)
- 2 × 130 L (34 US gal; 29 imp gal) drop-tanks

== See also ==
Related development

- Nakajima Ki-11
- Nakajima Ki-12
- Nakajima Ki-43

Aircraft of comparable role, configuration, and era

- Arado Ar 80
- Curtiss P-36 Hawk
- Dewoitine D.500
- Fokker D.XXI
- Gloster F.5/34
- Polikarpov I-16

Related lists

- List of aircraft of Japan during World War II
- List of aircraft of World War II
- List of military aircraft of Japan
