= Teruhiko Kobayashi =

Japanese WWII fighter pilot

- 小林 照彦
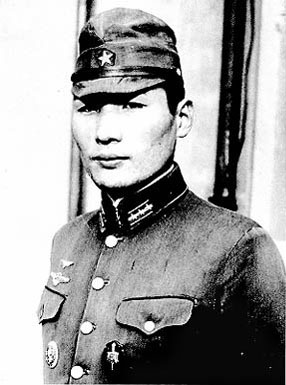
- Born: 17 November 1920; Tokyo, Empire of Japan
- Died: 4 June 1957 (aged 36); Shizuoka Prefecture, Japan
- Military career
- Allegiance: Empire of Japan (1941–45); Japan (1954–57)
- Branch: Imperial Japanese Army Air Service (IJA); Japan Air Self-Defense Force
- Service years: 1941–1945; 1954–1957
- Rank: Major (IJAAF); Lieutenant Colonel (JASDF)
- Units: 45th Sentai, 66th Sentai, 244th Sentai
- Commands: 244th Sentai
- Conflicts: World War II; Battle of Hong Kong; Defence of the Japanese Home Islands
- Awards: Bukochosho medal, 2nd Class

Teruhiko Kobayashi (小林 照彦, Kobayashi Teruhiko, 17 November 1920 – 4 June 1957) was a Japanese fighter pilot during World War II and a flying ace of the Imperial Japanese Army Air Force. He began his flying career as a bomber pilot, but then rose to fame when he became the leader of the 244th Sentai, making him the youngest sentai leader in the IJAAF when he took command in November 1944. He was described as an excellent and charismatic leader by his men and under his command the 244th would become the most famous and successful aerial defense unit in Japan. While leading this unit he achieved five kills (three Boeing B-29 Superfortresses and two F6F "Hellcats") in the aerial defense of the Japanese Home Islands. He would survive the war and in 1954 join the newly created Japan Air Self-Defense Force (JASDF).

== Early life ==
Teruhiko Kobayashi was born on 17 November 1920, in Tokyo Prefecture and would receive his education at Kokushikan Junior High School. He would end up later attending the Imperial Japanese Army Academy in the late 1930s graduating in 1940 in the 53rd class of the academy. Upon graduation he was appointed as a second lieutenant in the artillery, he would later switch this to become a light bomber pilot and began his flight training to become a bomber pilot. After completing flight training he was assigned to the 45th Sentai.

== World War II ==
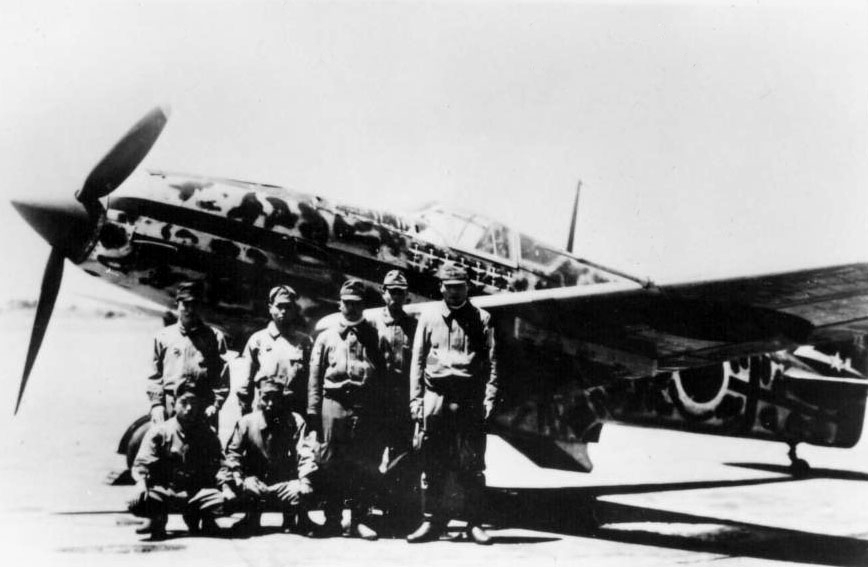
Kobayashi with aircrew in front of a Kawasaki Ki-61 Hien of 244th Sentai May 1945

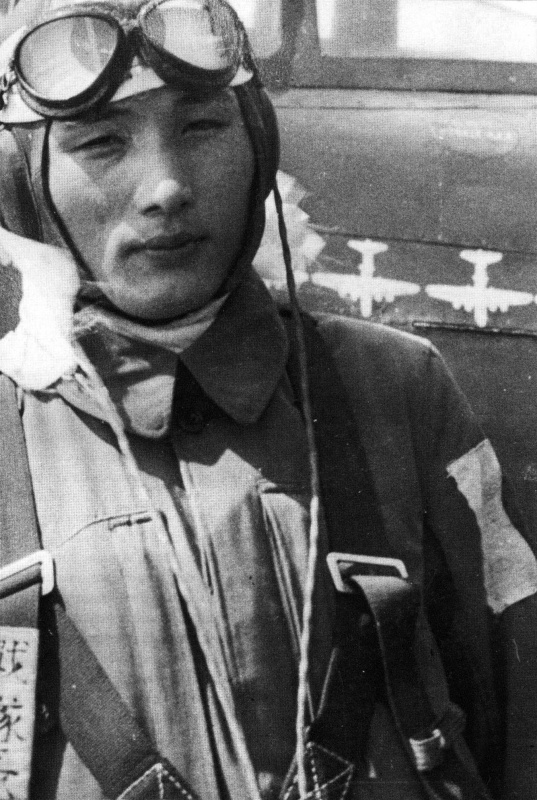
Kobayashi in flight gear, behind him is his Kawasaki Ki-100 Otsu, May 1945.

As a bomber pilot, Kobayashi would participate in one of the first actions in the war at the Battle of Hong Kong in December 1941. During this battle as part of the 45th Sentai, he would pilot an obsolete Kawasaki Ki-32 "Mary" light bomber attacking British military installations and ships. He would later join the 66th Sentai based in Manchuria, gaining valuable experience with this unit. In November 1943 he officially switched from a being a bomber pilot to being a fighter pilot, and would go on to receive his fighter pilot training at the Akeno Army Air Service School at its Kameyama Branch. After completing fighter student education, he was kept in Japan for instructor duties at Akeno Army Airfield, Sano Army Airfield, and Hayashi Army Airfield.

In late November 1944, at the rank of captain, he was given command of the 244th Sentai based at Chōfu Airbase, he was only 24 years old at the time, making him the youngest sentai commander in all of the IJAAF. The 244th Sentai was assigned to the aerial defense of the capital Tokyo. As commander of this unit, Kobayashi would pilot the Kawasaki Ki-61 "Hien" fighter, by October 1944, the 244th had around 40 Ki-61s and had spent a large amount of time training to intercept B-29 bombers that would inevitably come bomb the capital. As a result of this, the 244th was considered an exceptional unit, capable of defending the capital. They were also one of the only home defense fighter units that practiced night formation flying allowing them to perform night interceptions (this was limited to the more veteran pilots).

On December 3, 1944, Kobayashi shot down his first B-29, and in a single pass the 244th claimed 6 of these bombers -on that same sortie- through ramming attacks with all pilots surviving their attacks. On December 22, 1944, Kobayashi claimed he damaged a B-29 when the bombers had come to attack a Mitsubishi factory, an operation which was later aborted. The B-29 which was damaged by Kobayashi's head on attack had its No.3 engine damaged and the bomber soon fell out of formation and failed to return to its base. On January 27, 1945, during a diving attack on a B-29, Kobayashi's "Hien" fighter rammed into the B-29. Luckily, he parachuted out of his craft and landed safely on the ground suffering only minor bruises. The exploits of the 244th were published daily in the newspapers at time, earning the young captain much fame.

Kobayashi would once again damage another B-29 on April 12, 1945, but was wounded in the leg as a result of the attack forcing him to parachute once again. In May 1945 he began flying the new Kawasaki Ki-100 (Type 5 Army Fighter) which had a more reliable engine compared to the Hien and better performance as well as armament. In that same month his unit would receive a letter of commendation from the Army High Command and his actions would be recognized when he was awarded the Second-class Bukōshō medal as well as a promotion to major.

Major Kobayashi was almost court martialed as a result of disobeying orders on July 25, 1945, when he and his men took off in their Kawasaki Ki-100 Goshikisen (Type 5 Fighter) fighters in order to attack marauding US Navy F6F Hellcats of VF-31 from the carrier USS Belleau Wood (CVL-24). Kobayashi's unit had been ordered to stand down and wait for incoming bombers. Ignoring this order, they then proceeded to engage the Hellcats that were attacking Yokaichi Air Field in an aerial dogfight that took place almost at hangar-top height. The 244th claimed that they had destroyed 10 Hellcats from VF-31 when in reality both sides lost 2 planes each. While the newspapers celebrated the unit's actions, the court martial was set to go on for the young commander, which carried a very serious penalty. However, when news of Kobayashi's actions reached the Emperor, and words of Imperial approval for Kobayashi's actions were spoken, the court martial was dropped.

== Post-war years and death ==
Major Kobayashi survived the war and would go working in the civilian sector for some nine years until joining the recently created Japan Air Self-Defense Force in 1954. He entered the Japan Air Self-Defense Force executive school and went on to become a fighter pilot again. After working at Matsushima and Tsuiki bases, he studied abroad in the United States for about half a year from November 1955, and received training on the operation of F-86 fighters. On 4 June 1957 Kobayashi was flying a T-33 Shooting Star on a training sortie from Hamamatsu when a technical problem occurred just shortly after takeoff. Kobayashi ordered his co-pilot to eject then tried to take control of the aircraft and attempted to land it away from any populated areas, but the jet crashed shortly after and he did not survive the crash.

== Bibliography ==
- Osuo, Katsuhiko & Ledet, Michel (June 2001). "Kobayashi et ses avions au 244 Sentai" [Kobayashi and his Aircraft of the 244th Sentai]. Avions: Toute l'Aéronautique et son histoire (in French) (99): 9–16. ISSN 1243-8650.
