= Mitsubishi Ki-18 =

Japanese fighter prototype

Ki-18
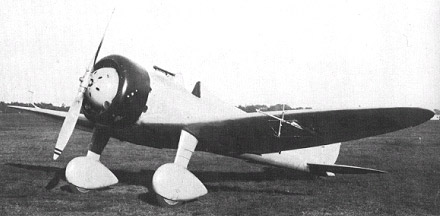
- Mitsubishi Ki-18

General information
- Type: prototype fighter aircraft
- Manufacturer: Mitsubishi Heavy Industries
- Primary user: IJA Air Force
- Number built: 1

History
- First flight: August 1935

The Mitsubishi Ki-18 (三菱 キ18, Ki-jyuhachi) was an unsuccessful and unsolicited attempt by Mitsubishi to meet a 1934 requirement issued by the Japanese Army for a modern single-seat monoplane fighter suitable to the needs of the Imperial Japanese Army Air Force. During this competition, Nakajima entered the Nakajima Ki-11 (which was somewhat similar to the Boeing P-26 Peashooter), and Kawasaki entered the more maneuverable Kawasaki Ki-10 biplane. The competition was won by Kawasaki, but the new fighter was not accepted by the IJAAF with much enthusiasm.

== Design and development ==
In 1934, Mitsubishi had developed the Ka-14 9-Shi fighter prototype specifically for an Imperial Japanese Navy requirement. The design exhibited outstanding performance, and with the Navy's consent, the Army placed a contract with Mitsubishi for a modified version for evaluation, which was designated the Ki-18.

The Ki-18 was a low-wing monoplane of all-metal construction with fabric-covered control surfaces. It was powered by a Nakajima Kotobuki-5 nine-cylinder radial engine, rated at 410 kW (550 hp) for take-off, and 447 kW (600 hp) at 3,100 m (10,170 ft), driving a two-blade fixed-pitch wooden propeller.

The main external differences between the Ki-18 and the Ka-14 included an enlarged rudder, larger landing gear (with spats) and an engine cowling. Internally, the direction of the throttle movement was reversed to meet Army practice, and the machine guns were replaced with Army standard weaponry.

The Ki-18 made its first flight once completed in August 1935 at the Army's Tachikawa Air Technical Research Institute, and was later tested at the Akeno Army Flying School through the end of 1935.

In early 1936, the engine was changed to the Nakajima Kotobuki 3, rated at 477 kW (640 hp) for take-off and 533 kW (715 hp) at 2,800 m (9,190 ft). During testing, the Ki-18 achieved a maximum speed of 444 km/h (276 mph) at 3,050 m (10,010 ft) was recorded, and the aircraft was able to climb to 5,000 m (16,400 ft) in 6 minutes 25.8 seconds, which was considered an exceptional rate for the time.

The Akeno Army Flying School test results gave the Ki-18 a very high recommendation, and it was proposed that the fighter be produced for front-line service. However, the Army Air Technical Research Institute was vehemently against using a Navy design, and after choosing to ignore the data, claimed that the Nakajima Kotobuki engines were "unreliable" and that the Ki-18 lacked the performance necessary for an Army fighter. Instead, the Army Air Technical Research Institute recommended that a new competition would be staged, with Nakajima, Kawasaki and Mitsubishi invited to participate. As the Ki-10 had entered production only one year earlier, this proposal was immediately vetoed by the Imperial Japanese Army General Staff. Thus, the Ki-18 ended with only one aircraft, although the essentially identical Ka-14 was accepted as a revolutionary fighter by the Japanese Navy as the Mitsubishi A5M Type 96 carrier-based fighter.

== Variants ==
- Ki-18 : Prototype for testing (1 unit produced)

== Operators ==
Japan

- Imperial Japanese Army Air Force

== Specifications (Ki-18) ==
Data from Japanese Aircraft, 1910-1941, and Famous Airplanes of the World, first series, #76: Army Experimental Fighters (1)

General characteristics

- Crew: 1
- Length: 7.655 m (25 ft 1 in)
- Wingspan: 11 m (36 ft 1 in)
- Height: 3.15 m (10 ft 4 in)
- Wing area: 17.8 m^{2} (192 sq ft)
- Empty weight: 1,110 kg (2,447 lb)
- Gross weight: 1,422 kg (3,135 lb)
- Powerplant: 1 × Nakajima Kotobuki 5 9-cylinder air-cooled radial piston engine, 333 kW (447 hp)

Performance

- Maximum speed: 444 km/h (276 mph, 240 kn) at 3,050 m (10,000 ft)
- Rate of climb: 12.95 m/s (2,550 ft/min)
- Wing loading: 79.9 kg/m^{2} (16.4 lb/sq ft)
- Power/mass: 0.31 kW/kg (0.19 hp/lb)

Armament

- Guns: 2× fixed forward-firing 7.7 mm (.303 in) Type 89 machine guns

== See also ==
Related development

- Mitsubishi A5M
- Mitsubishi Ki-33

Related lists

- List of military aircraft of Japan
