= Yasuhiko Kuroe =

Japanese World War II fighter ace

- 黒江 保彦
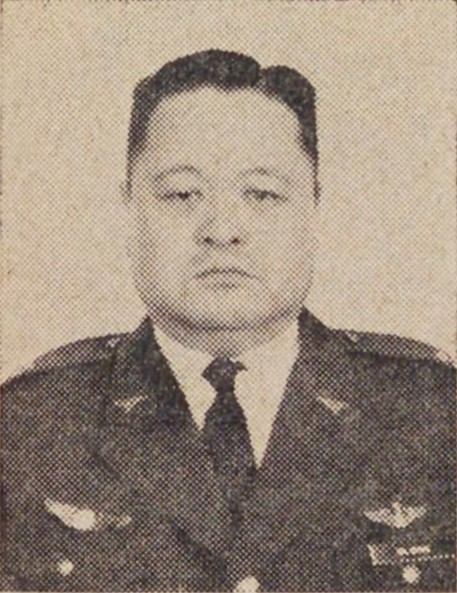
- Born: 17 February 1918; Kagoshima, Japan
- Died: 5 December 1965 (aged 47); Ishikawa, Japan
- Military career
- Allegiance: Empire of Japan
- Branch: Imperial Japanese Army Air Service (IJAAS); Japan Air Self-Defense Force (JASDF)
- Rank: Major (IJAAS); Major General (JASDF)
- Units: 59th Sentai; 47th Independent Chūtai; 64th Sentai
- Conflicts: Second Sino-Japanese War; Battle of Khalkhin Gol; World War II; Malayan Campaign; Battle of Singapore; Burma Campaign; Air raids on Japan

Yasuhiko Kuroe (黒江 保彦, Kuroe Yasuhiko; 17 February 1918 – 5 December 1965) was a fighter ace in the Imperial Japanese Army (IJA) during World War II. He participated in various campaigns in Southeast Asia. He was officially credited with destroying 30 enemy aircraft. After the war he served in the new Japanese Self Defence Force (JSDF).

== Early career ==
Yasuhiko Kuroe graduated from the Imperial Japanese Army Academy in June 1937. He completed an aerial training program at Akeno and became a fighter pilot. He was assigned to the 59th Sentai in Hankou, Central China in November 1938. By then the air combat became much less intense and as result, he was mostly conducting training and patrol missions without seeing much action. At the beginning of 1939, his unit was transferred to Yuncheng in Shanxi province, where he did not see much action either. Nakajima Ki-27 fighters lacked the range to escort IJA bombers during the attacks against Lanzhou. In spring 1939 he returned to Hankou.

In the middle of August 1939, his unit is sent to Harbin in Manchuria and then at the beginning of September to Saienjo airfield near Nomonhan to participate in the final stages of the Battle of Khalkhin Gol. On 5 September Lieutenant Kurobe was on standby in his Ki-27 when three Soviet fighters appeared over the airfield. He took off and chased them. However, when he caught up with them he realized he forgot to open the cap on the telescopic sight and had to aim by feeling and was therefore unable to hit them. The next opportunity came on 15 September when IJAAF conducted a large strike against a Soviet airbase with 240 aircraft. In the ensuing air battle he managed to shoot down two Soviet Polikarpov I-15 fighters over Tamsagbulag in Mongolia. Soon afterwards, the cease-fire agreement was reached and his unit returned to Hankou in Central China.

At the beginning of autumn 1940, Lieutenant Kurobe and his unit moved to Guangdong in South China in order to support the Japanese invasion of French Indochina. Following that, he moved to Weizhou Island in Gulf of Tonkin to cover the evacuation of South Guangxi. After the successful evacuation, he again returned to Hankou in Central China where he remained until January 1941, before he was transferred to the Army Academy to serve as an instructor.

== Pacific War ==
At the start of the Pacific War, he was promoted to captain and was transferred to the 47th Independent Chūtai, which operated prototype Nakajima Ki-44 fighters. From December 1941 to March 1942, he was then involved in Malaya Campaign and Battle of Singapore, during which he claimed shooting down three enemy aircraft.

On 24 April, Captain Kuroe was transferred to the 64th Sentai to take over the command of the 3rd Chūtai leader of the 64th Sentai, after the previous commander was killed in action during the Japanese invasion of Burma. He then switched to Nakajima Ki-43 fighter. In March 1943 he was promoted to executive officer of the 64th Sentai. He saw extensive action over Burma from April 1942 to January 1944, where his unit mostly operated from airfields at Rangoon and Meiktila. His missions typically involved performing fighter sweeps and escorting bombers to Arakan, Chittagong and Assam areas, or defending Rangoon and Meiktila from Allied bombers. His last mission in Burma Campaign was on 18 December 1943.

In January 1944 he was transferred to Japan to test the new Kawasaki Ki-102, Nakajima Ki-106 and Mitsubishi Ki-109 interceptors and the rocket-powered Mitsubishi J8M, all intended to intercept Boeing B-29 bombers. He shot down one B-29 on 25 March and two more on 23/24 May 1945.

== Later career ==
After the war he served in the new Japanese Self Defence Force, where he flew and commanded jet fighters of Japan Air Self-Defense Force. He was eventually promoted to the rank of major general. He was killed in an accident while fishing in 1965.
