= Kawasaki Ki-28 =

Japanese experimental fighter

Ki-28
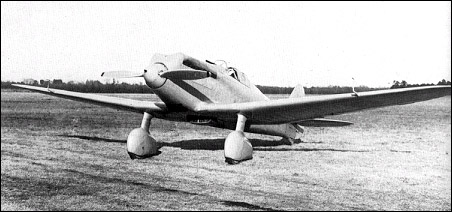
- The sole prototype of the Kawasaki Ki-28

General information
- Type: Experimental Fighter Aircraft
- Manufacturer: Kawasaki Kōkūki Kōgyō K.K.
- Designer: Takeo Doi
- Primary user: Imperial Japanese Army Air Service
- Number built: 1

History
- First flight: 1936

The Kawasaki Ki-28 (キ28, Ki-Nijuhachi), World War II Allied reporting name "Bob", was an experimental fighter aircraft designed for the Imperial Japanese Army and meant as a replacement for the Kawasaki Ki-10. It flew in 1936 but was never produced for actual use, as the Army chose the Nakajima Ki-27.

== Design & Development ==
The Ki-28 was initially produced by Kawasaki Kōkūki Kōgyō K.K. in response to Japanese Army specifications for a fighter to replace the existing Kawasaki Ki-10. In mid-1935, Kawasaki, Mitsubishi, and Nakajima were instructed to build competitive prototypes. The Kawasaki design was based on its earlier but unsuccessful Ki-5. It was a low-wing cantilever monoplane of all-metal construction, except for fabric-covered control surfaces, with a conventional tail unit, fixed tailskid landing gear, and powered by a 596 kW (800 hp) Kawasaki Ha 9-II-Ko liquid-cooled inline V12 engine.

Service trials proved that the Kawasaki Ki-28 was the fastest of the three contenders, but the Nakajima Ki-27 was by far the most maneuverable and had the lowest wing-loading. On this basis, the Ki-27 was selected by the Imperial Japanese Army Air Force. Despite losing to the Ki-27, the Ki-28 provided Kawasaki with valuable experience, which would later help with development of the Kawasaki Ki-60 and Kawasaki Ki-61 fighters.

Mistakenly believing the Ki-28 to have entered production in Japan as the Army Type 97 Fighter, the Allies assigned it the reporting name "Bob" during World War II.

== Operators ==
=== Military operators ===
Japan

- Imperial Japanese Army Air Force

== Specifications ==
Data from Famous Aircraft of the World, no.76: Japanese Army Experimental Fighters (1), Japanese Aircraft, 1910-1941

General characteristics

- Crew: 1
- Length: 7.9 m (25 ft 11 in)
- Wingspan: 12 m (39 ft 4 in)
- Height: 2.6 m (8 ft 6 in)
- Wing area: 19 m^{2} (200 sq ft)
- Empty weight: 1,420 kg (3,131 lb)
- Gross weight: 1,760 kg (3,880 lb)
- Powerplant: × Kawasaki Ha9-II-Ko V-12 liquid-cooled piston engine, 597 kW (801 hp)
- Propellers: 2-bladed fixed-pitch propeller, 2.9 m (9 ft 6 in) diameter

Performance

- Maximum speed: 485 km/h (301 mph, 262 kn)
- Service ceiling: 11,000 m (36,000 ft)
- Time to altitude: 5,000 metres (16,000 ft) in 5 minutes 10 seconds
- Wing loading: 92.6 kg/m^{2} (19.0 lb/sq ft)
- Power/mass: 0.33 kW/kg (0.20 hp/lb)

Armament

- Guns: 2 × 7.7 mm (.303 in) machine guns

== See also ==
Related lists

- List of military aircraft of Japan

== Bibliography ==
- Francillon, René J. (1979). Japanese aircraft of the Pacific War (2nd ed.). London: Putnam. ISBN 0-370-30251-6.
- Mikesh, Robert C.; Abe, Shorzoe (1990). Japanese Aircraft 1910-1941. Annapolis, MD: Naval Institute Press. ISBN 1-55750-563-2.
- "Japanese Army Experimental Fighters (1)". Famous Aircraft of the World. No. 76. Tokyo, Japan: Bunrin-Do Co. August 1976.
- Wieliczko, Leszek A.; Szeremeta, Zygmunt (2004). Nakajima Ki 27 Nate (in Polish and English). Lublin, Poland: Kagero. ISBN 83-89088-51-7.
