= Imperial Japanese Army Air Academy =

The Imperial Japanese Army Air Academy (陸軍航空士官学校, Rikugun Kōkū Shikan Gakkō) was the principal officers' training school for the Imperial Japanese Army Air Service. The classrooms of the academy were located in the city of Sayama, Saitama Prefecture, northwest of Tokyo. An airfield was added in 1937 and used by the IJA Air Service until 1945.

== Post-war use ==
It was used from 1945 to 1947 by the United States Army Air Forces and from 1947 to 1962 by the United States Air Force as Johnson Air Base. The Japan Air Self-Defense Force began to use the base in 1958 and last U.S. forces left in 1978.

The former airfield of the Academy is now Iruma Air Base of the Japan Air Self-Defense Force.

== Superintendents ==
- Major General Hayashi Kinoshita: October 1, 1937
- Major General Shōzō Teraguchi: July 1, 1939
- Lieutenant General Hayashi Kinoshita: September 15, 1941
- Major General Saburō Endō: December 1, 1942
- Lieutenant General Michio Sugawara: May 1, 1943
- Lieutenant General Baron Yoshitoshi Tokugawa: March 28, 1944

== Notable alumni ==
(IJA: Imperial Japanese Army, JGSDF: Japan Ground Self-Defense Force, JASDF: Japan Air Self-Defense Force)

- Seiroku Kajiyama: LDP politician, minister
- General Osamu Namatame: IJA and JASDF officer
- Captain Isamu Kashiide: IJA
- Lieutenant Genera Kim Chung-yul : IJA and Korean Air Force officer, Prime Minister of South Korea
- General Shigehiro Mori: IJA and JASDF officer, Chief of Staff, Joint Staff
- General Gorō Takeda: IJA and JASDF officer, Chief of Staff, Joint Staff
- General Motoharu Shirakawa: IJA and JASDF officer, Chief of Staff, Joint Staff
- Captain Yoshio Yoshida: IJA aviator, flying ace during WW2
- General Kanshi Ishikawa: IJA and JASDF officer
- General Morio Nakamura: IJA and JGSDF
- Takuma Yamamoto: computer engineer, businessmen, vice chairman of Nippon Kaigi, Order of the British Empire
- Tadashi Itagaki: LDP politician, senior adviser of Japan War-Bereaved Families Association, son of General Seishirō Itagaki
- Major General Yasuhiko Kuroe: IJA and JASDF officer
- Air Commodore Ramesh Sakharam Benegal: Indian Airforce Officer
- Cadet Ōe Shinobu (1928-2009), military historian

== See also ==
- Imperial Japanese Army Academy
- Tokyo Boys
- F Kikan (Fujiwara Kikan)
