= Ramesh Sakharam Benegal =

Indian Air Force officer

Air Commodore Ramesh Sakharam Benegal MVC AVSM
- Born: 9 October 1926; Rangoon, Burma, British India
- Died: April 2003 (aged 76)
- Military career
- Allegiance: Azad Hind (1944–1945); India (1952–1977)
- Branch: Indian Air Force
- Rank: Air Commodore
- Unit: No. 106 Squadron IAF
- Commands: No. 106 Squadron IAF
- Conflicts: Indo-Pakistani War of 1965; Indo-Pakistani War of 1971
- Awards: Maha Vir Chakra; Ati Vishisht Seva Medal

Air Commodore Ramesh Sakharam Benegal MVC AVSM (9 October 1926 – April 2003) was an ex-officer of the Indian Air Force and a recipient of Maha Vir Chakra, India's second highest award for gallantry, and the Ati Vishisht Seva Medal.

== Early life ==
Ramesh Sakharam Benegal was born on 9 October 1926 in Rangoon, Burma, which was then part of British India, to Shri Benegal Sakharam Rao and his wife Kalyani. He was the youngest of his family, with two elder brothers, Dinker and Sumitra. While in high school, he was an enthusiastic member of the Boy Scouts organisation.

== Military career ==
=== Indian National Army ===
In his youth, during the Second World War, Benegal joined the Indian National Army and was chosen to join the Tokyo Boys to train as a fighter pilot. He went on to attend the Imperial Japanese Army Air Force Academy in 1944. However, before he could complete his training and join active operations, the war ended. Held as a prisoner of war after the fall of Japan, Benegal was released in 1946.

=== Indian Air Force ===
In May 1950, he joined the Patna flying club to learn to fly and earn a commercial flying license. While there, he got the opportunity to try out for the Air Force during an IAF recruitment drive and was selected for IAF training at Air Force Academy Jodhpur. He was commissioned into the Indian Air Force in 1952.

He saw action in both the 1965 and 1971 Indo-Pakistan Wars. During the 1971 war, as a wing commander, he was the commanding officer of No. 106 Squadron IAF, an operational reconnaissance squadron operating Electric Canberras. He carried out a large number of missions over enemy territory in both the western and eastern sectors and obtained vital information about enemy installations and troop formations. These missions required flying unarmed and unescorted deep into enemy territory for reconnaissance and aerial photography of heavily defended targets. The information obtained from these missions facilitated the planning of Army, Air Force and Naval operations and directly contributed to the success of the war effort. He was also known to have never returned from any of these missions without having fully achieved his objectives. For bravery and leadership displayed in repeatedly flying deep into enemy territory in an unarmed aircraft, Ramesh Sakharam Benegal was awarded the Ati Vishist Seva Medal and the Mahavir Chakra.

He later rose to the rank of air commodore before retiring.
