= Nakajima Ki-11 =

Japanese fighter prototype

Ki-11
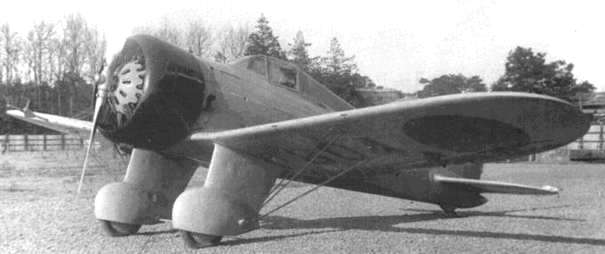

General information
- Type: prototype fighter aircraft
- Manufacturer: Nakajima Aircraft Company
- Primary user: IJA Air Force
- Number built: 4

History
- First flight: 1934
- Variant: Nakajima Ki-27

The Nakajima Ki-11 (キ11 (航空機), Ki-jyuichi Kokūki) was an unsuccessful attempt by Nakajima Aircraft Company to meet a 1935 requirement issued by the Japanese government for a modern single-seat monoplane fighter suitable to meet the needs of both the Imperial Japanese Army Air Force and Imperial Japanese Navy Air Service

== Design and development ==
Development of the Ki-11 began as a private venture in 1934, based on a wire-braced low-wing monoplane, inspired by the Boeing P-26 Peashooter. The fuselage wing center section and undercarriage were constructed in duralumin, while the wings and tail were of wood and canvas. The aircraft was powered by a single 410 kW (550 hp) Nakajima Kotobuki Ha-1-3 radial engine. Proposed armament consisted of twin 7.7 mm (.303 in) machine guns firing from between the engine cylinders.

The Ki-11 was entered into competition with the Kawasaki Ki-10 biplane design. Although technically more advanced and faster than the Kawasaki design, the Imperial Japanese Army command was split between supporters of "maneuverability" and supporters of "speed". The supporters of the "maneuverability" scheme won, and the Ki-10 became the main army fighter until 1937. Nakajima continued to refine the Ki-11 design, and it re-emerged in the form of the Nakajima Ki-27 "Nate" several years later.

Nakajima later sold the fourth prototype as AN-1 Communications Aircraft to the Asahi Shimbun newspaper, who registered it as J-BBHA and used it as a liaison and courier plane, and for reconnaissance and news-gathering flights.

== Variants ==
- Nakajima Ki-11

initial prototype (4 built); #4 with enclosed cockpit

== Operators ==
- Asahi Shimbun

== Specifications (Ki-11) ==
Data from Famous Airplanes of the World, first series, #76: Army Experimental Fighters (1)

General characteristics

- Crew: 1
- Length: 6.89 m (22 ft 7 in)
- Wingspan: 10.88 m (35 ft 8 in)
- Height: 3.33 m (10 ft 11 in)
- Wing area: 19.1 m^{2} (205.6 sq ft)
- Empty weight: 1,269 kg (2,798 lb)
- Gross weight: 1,560 kg (3,440 lb)
- Powerplant: 1 × Nakajima Ha-1-3 Kotobuki air-cooled radial engine , 410 kW (550 hp)

Performance

- Maximum speed: 420 km/h (262 mph, 228 kn)
- Range: 410 km (250 mi, 220 nmi)
- Service ceiling: 10,200 m (33,500 ft)

Armament

- 2 × 7.7 mm (.303 in) Type 89 machine guns

== See also ==
Aircraft of comparable role, configuration, and era

- P-26 Peashooter
