= Tokyo Boys =

Group of youth recruits of the Indian National Army

The Tokyo Boys, Tokyo Imperial Military Academy.

The Tokyo Cadets or the Tokyo Boys, was the name given to the group of forty five youth recruits of the Indian National Army who were sent to the Imperial Japanese Army Academy or Imperial Japanese Army Air Force Academy to train as fighter pilots in 1944 by Subhas Chandra Bose. The cadets were captured as prisoners of war after Japan surrendered, but were released in 1946 after the end of the INA trials. The cadets became officers in the Indian forces, Burma Navy, Pakistan forces, and private pilots. Some of them became general officers.

== Notable members ==
- Air Cmde Ramesh Sakharam Benegal, MVC, AVSM (Retd), Indian Air Force.

== Sources ==
- Ayer, Subbier Appadurai, Unto Him a Witness: The Story of Netaji Subhas Chandra Bose in East Asia, Thacker, 1951
- The Contemporary, Society for Contemporary Studies, University of Michigan, v.14, 1970
