= Ranks of the Imperial Japanese Army =

Imperial Japanese Army uniforms and ranks during World War II (US Army poster)

The Ranks of the Imperial Japanese Army were the rank insignia of the Imperial Japanese Army, used from its creation in 1868, until its dissolution in 1945 following the Surrender of Japan in World War II.

The officer rank names were used for both the Imperial Japanese Army and Imperial Japanese Navy, the only distinction being the placement of the word Rikugun (army) or Kaigun (navy) before the rank. Thus, for example, a captain in the navy shared the same rank designation as that of a colonel in the army: Taisa (colonel), so the rank of Rikugun Taisa denoted an army colonel, while the rank of Kaigun daisa denoted a naval captain.

== Meiji 19 insignia ==
=== Officer ranks ===
The rank insignia of commissioned officers.

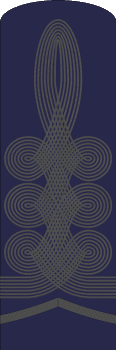
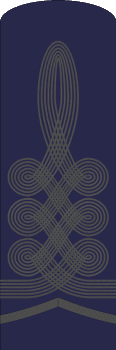
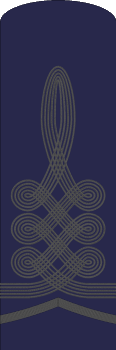
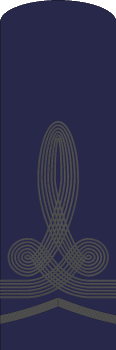
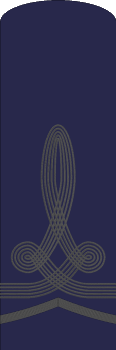
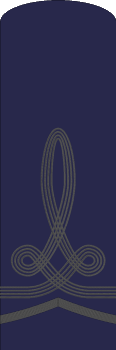
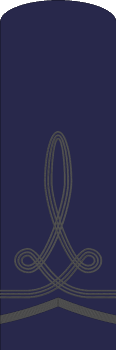
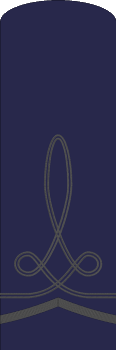
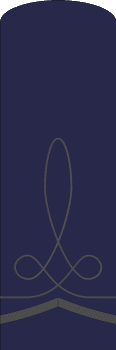
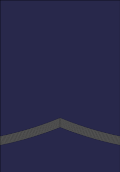
Rank group	General / flag officers			Senior officers			Junior officers
Sleeve insignia (1868–1904)
Sleeve insignia (1868–1904)	陸軍大将; Rikugun-Taishō	陸軍中将; Rikugun-Chūjō	陸軍少将; Rikugun-Shōshō	陸軍大佐; Rikugun-Taisa	陸軍中佐; Rikugun-Chūsa	陸軍少佐; Rikugun-Shōsa	陸軍大尉; Rikugun-Tai-i	陸軍中尉; Rikugun-Chūi	陸軍少尉; Rikugun-Shōi	准士官・下副官; Junsikan·Kafukukan
English translation	General	Lieutenant general	Major general	Colonel	Lieutenant colonel	Major	Captain	Lieutenant	Second lieutenant	Warrant officer · Adjutant

=== Other ranks ===
The rank insignia of non-commissioned officers and enlisted personnel.

Rank group	Senior NCOs		Junior NCOs	Enlisted
Sleeve insignia (1868–1904)
Sleeve insignia (1868–1904)	曹長; Sōchō	一等軍曹 （近衛） Ittō-Gunsō (Konoe)	二等軍曹; Nitō-Gunsō	上等兵; Jōtō-Hei	一等兵 （近衛） Ittō-Hei (Konoe)	二等兵; Nitō-Hei
English translation	Sergeant major	Sergeant first class (Guard)	Sergeant 2nd class	Superior private	Private first class (Guard)	Private 2nd class

== Cap badges ==
Officer is the one with the yellow star and red. Lower rank is the one with yellow star.

== Commissioned officer ranks ==
The rank insignia of commissioned officers.

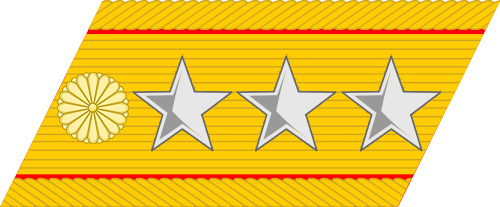
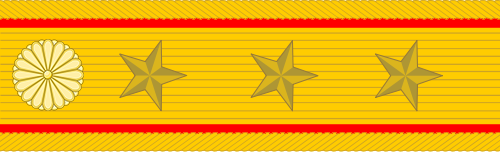
Rank group	General / flag officers				Senior officers			Junior officers
Title	大元帥陸軍大将; Daigensui-rikugun-taishō	陸軍大将; Rikugun-taishō (Note: Same rank insignia used for the Gensui-rikugun-taishō (元帥陸軍大将), worn with an additional badge.)	陸軍中将; Rikugun-chūjō	陸軍少将; Rikugun-shōshō	陸軍大佐; Rikugun-taisa	陸軍中佐; Rikugun-chūsa	陸軍少佐; Rikugun-shōsa	陸軍大尉; Rikugun-tai-i	陸軍中尉; Rikugun-chūi	陸軍少尉; Rikugun-shōi	准尉; Jun-i
Translation	Commander-in-chief	General	Lieutenant general	Major general	Colonel	Lieutenant colonel	Major	Captain	Lieutenant	Second lieutenant	Warrant officer
Showa 13 (1938)
Showa 18 (1943)
Shoulder
Sleeve

== Other ranks ==
The rank insignia of non-commissioned officers and enlisted personnel.

Rank group	Non-commissioned officers				Enlisted personnel
Title	曹長 (Sōchō)	軍曹 (Gunsō)	伍長 (Gochō)	兵長 (Heichō) 伍長勤務上等兵 (Gochō Kinmu jōtōhei)	上等兵 (Jōtōhei)	一等兵 (Ittōhei)	二等兵 (Nitōhei)	三等兵 (Santōhei)
Translation	Sergeant major	Sergeant	Corporal	Lance corporal	Superior private	Private first class	Private second class	Private
Collar
Shoulder

== See also ==
- Ranks of the Imperial Japanese Navy
- Imperial Japanese Army
- Ranks and insignia of the Japan Self-Defense Forces
