= Kawasaki Ki-10 =

Japanese fighter

Ki-10
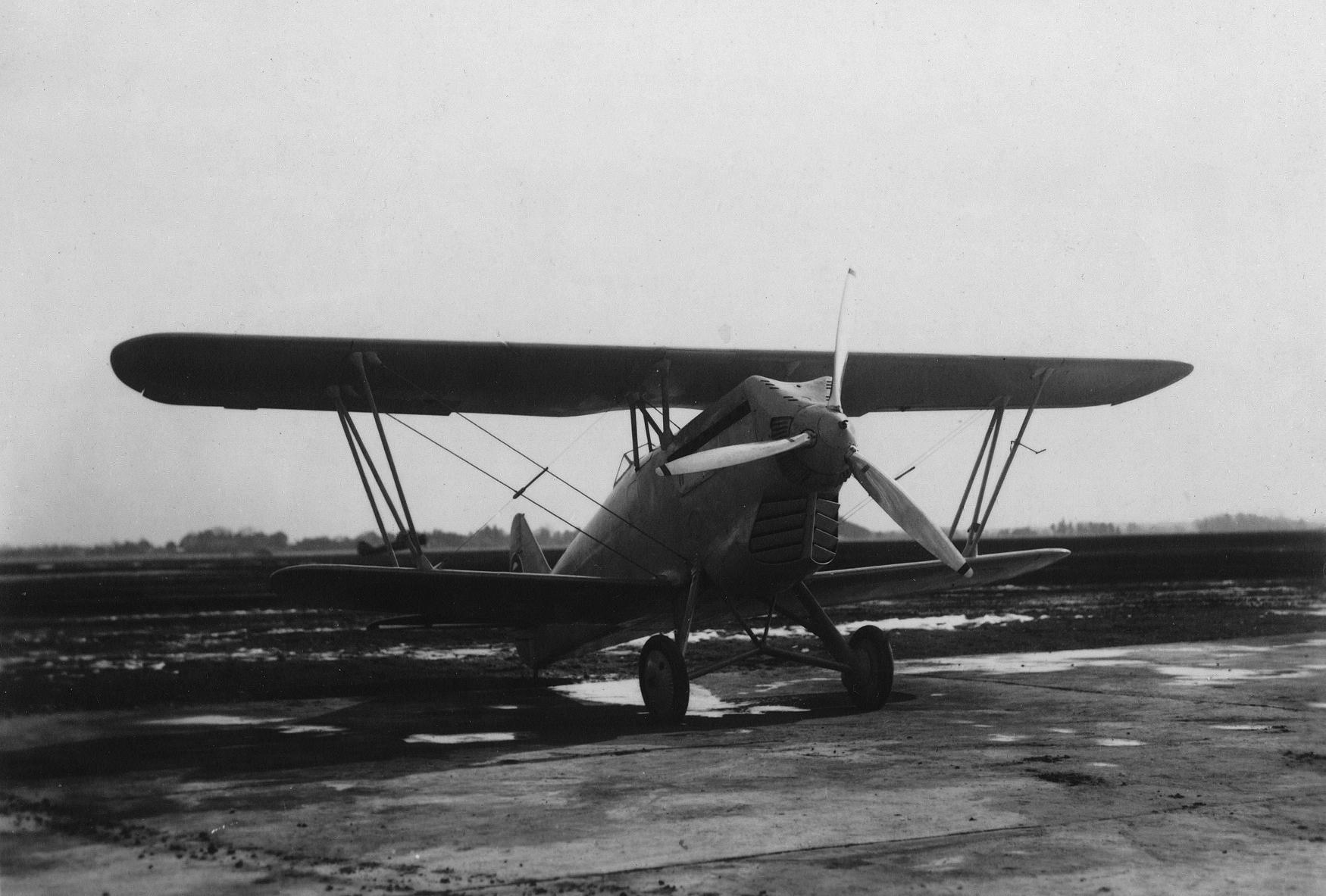
- Ki-10 Model 1

General information
- Type: Fighter
- National origin: Japan
- Manufacturer: Kawasaki Kōkūki Kōgyō K.K.
- Designer: Takeo Doi
- Status: Retired
- Primary user: Imperial Japanese Army Air Force
- Number built: 588

History
- Introduction date: 1935
- First flight: March 1935
- Retired: 1942

The Kawasaki Ki-10 (九五式戦闘機, Kyūgo-shiki sentōki; Army Type 95 Fighter) was the last biplane fighter used by the Imperial Japanese Army, entering service in 1935. Built by Kawasaki Kōkūki Kōgyō K.K. for the Imperial Japanese Army, it saw combat service in Manchukuo and in North China during the early stages of the Second Sino-Japanese War. Its reporting name given by the Allies was "Perry".

== Design and development ==
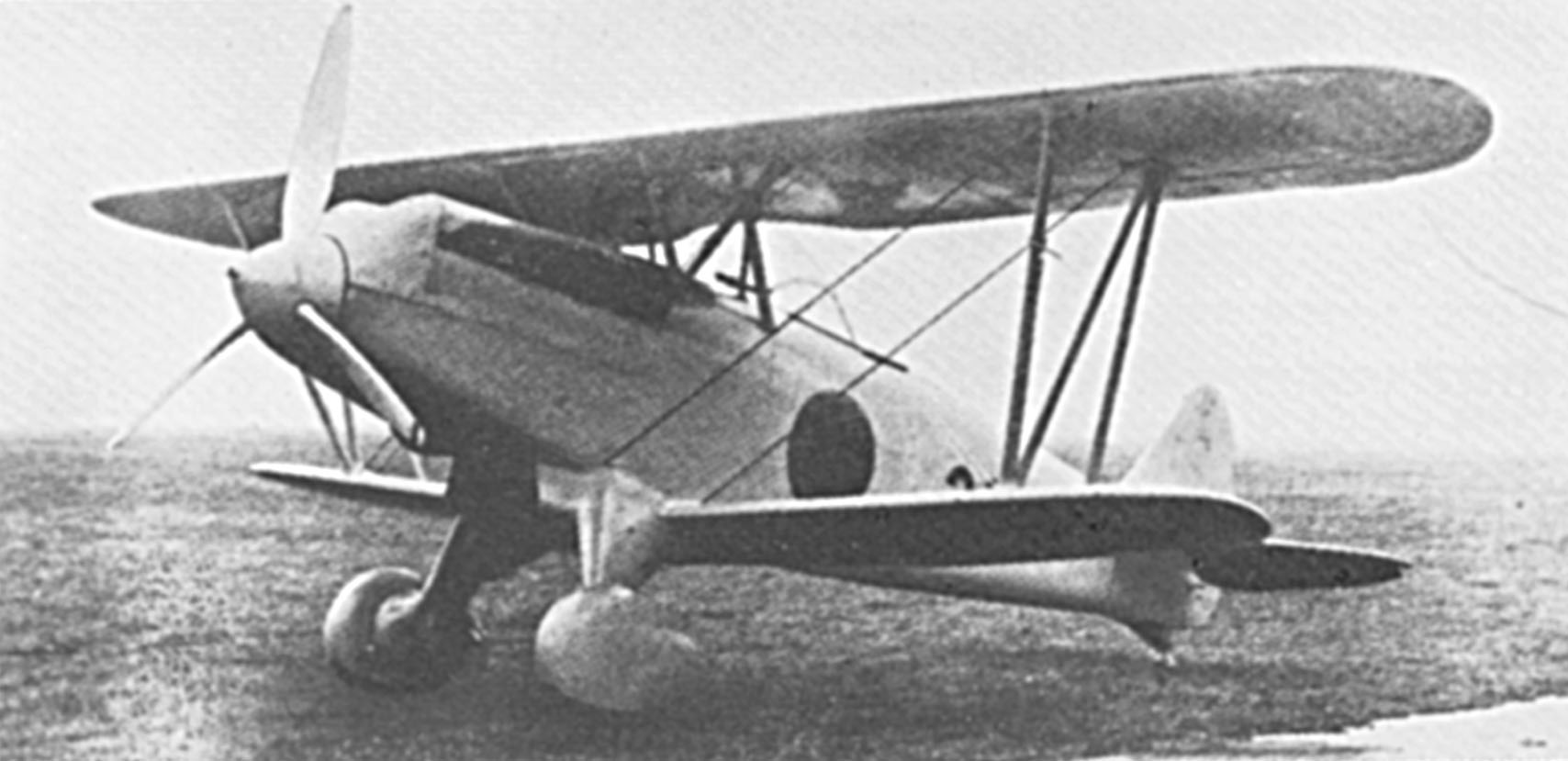
Kawasaki Ki-10-II KAI prototype

The Ki-10 was designed by Japanese aeronautical engineer Takeo Doi, who had succeeded Richard Vogt as chief designer for Kawasaki. The design was in response to a requirement issued by the Imperial Japanese Army for a new fighter, and was the winner of a competition against Nakajima's Ki-11. Although the low-wing monoplane offered by Nakajima was more advanced, the Army preferred the more maneuverable biplane offered by Kawasaki. In order to overcome the speed disadvantage the Kawasaki team used a metal three-blade propeller in the third prototype, while flush-head rivets were used in an attempt to reduce drag.

The Kawasaki design had unequal-span biplane wings, braced by struts, and with upper-wing ailerons. The structure was of all-metal construction, which was then fabric-covered. Armament consisted of two 7.7 mm (.303 in) Type 89 machine guns, synchronized to fire through the propeller. The initial production version was powered by a liquid-cooled 633 kW (850 hp) Kawasaki Ha9-IIa V-12.

== Operations ==
The Ki-10 was deployed in Manchukuo (Manchuria) and in the initial campaigns of the Second Sino-Japanese War in northern China.

On September 21, 1937, Major Hiroshi Miwa, formerly hired as a military flight instructor for Zhang Xueliang's Fengtian Army air corps and well known in the Chinese military aviation circles of the time, commanded a flight of 7 Ki-10 fighters of the 1st Daitai-16th Hiko Rentai, on an escort of 14 Mitsubishi Ki-2 bombers to attack the city of Taiyuan where they encountered Chinese air force V-65C Corsairs and Curtiss Hawk IIs, shooting down a few, but Major Miwa himself was shot down and fatally wounded by Captain Chan Kee-Wong, commander of the 28th Pursuit Squadron of the 5th Pursuit Group flying a Curtiss Hawk.

By the time of the Nomonhan Incident (Battles of Khalkhin Gol) in 1939, the Ki-10 had become largely obsolete, and was being superseded by the Nakajima Ki-27.

At the beginning of the Pacific War, the Ki-10 was retired to training and secondary missions, but later returned to front-line service, performing short-range patrol and reconnaissance missions in Japan proper and China in January–February 1942.

== Variants ==
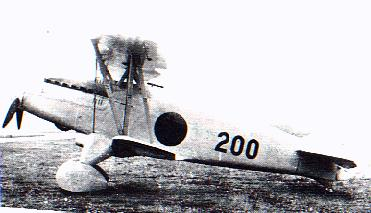
Kawasaki Ki-10-II KAI prototype

data from Japanese Aircraft of the Pacific War

- Ki-10 : Prototype for Imperial Japanese Army Air Force (4 built in early 1935).
- Ki-10-I (Army Fighter Type 95-I): Initial production version (300 built December 1935 - October 1937)
- Ki-10-II : Prototype of modified Mark I, increased in length (1 built May 1936)
- Ki-10-II (Army Fighter Type 95–2): Improved production version (280 built June 1937 - December 1938)
- Ki-10-I KAI : Prototype Ki-10-I with modifications to engine and radiator (1 built October 1936)
- Ki-10-II KAI : Prototype - Aerodynamic modification of Ki-10-II, now designated Ki-10-I-KAI, with 634 kW (850 hp) Kawasaki Ha9-IIb engine (2 built November 1937)

Total production: 588 units

== Operators ==
Japan

- Imperial Japanese Army Air Force
  - 1st Rentai IJAAF
  - 4th Rentai IJAAF
  - 5th Rentai IJAAF
  - 6th Rentai IJAAF
  - 8th Rentai IJAAF
  - 11th Rentai IJAAF
  - 13th Rentai IJAAF
  - 4th Sentai IJAAF
  - 9th Sentai IJAAF
  - 33rd Sentai IJAAF
  - 59th Sentai IJAAF
  - 64th Sentai IJAAF
  - 77th Sentai IJAAF
  - Akeno Fighter Training School

== Specifications (Ki-10-II) ==
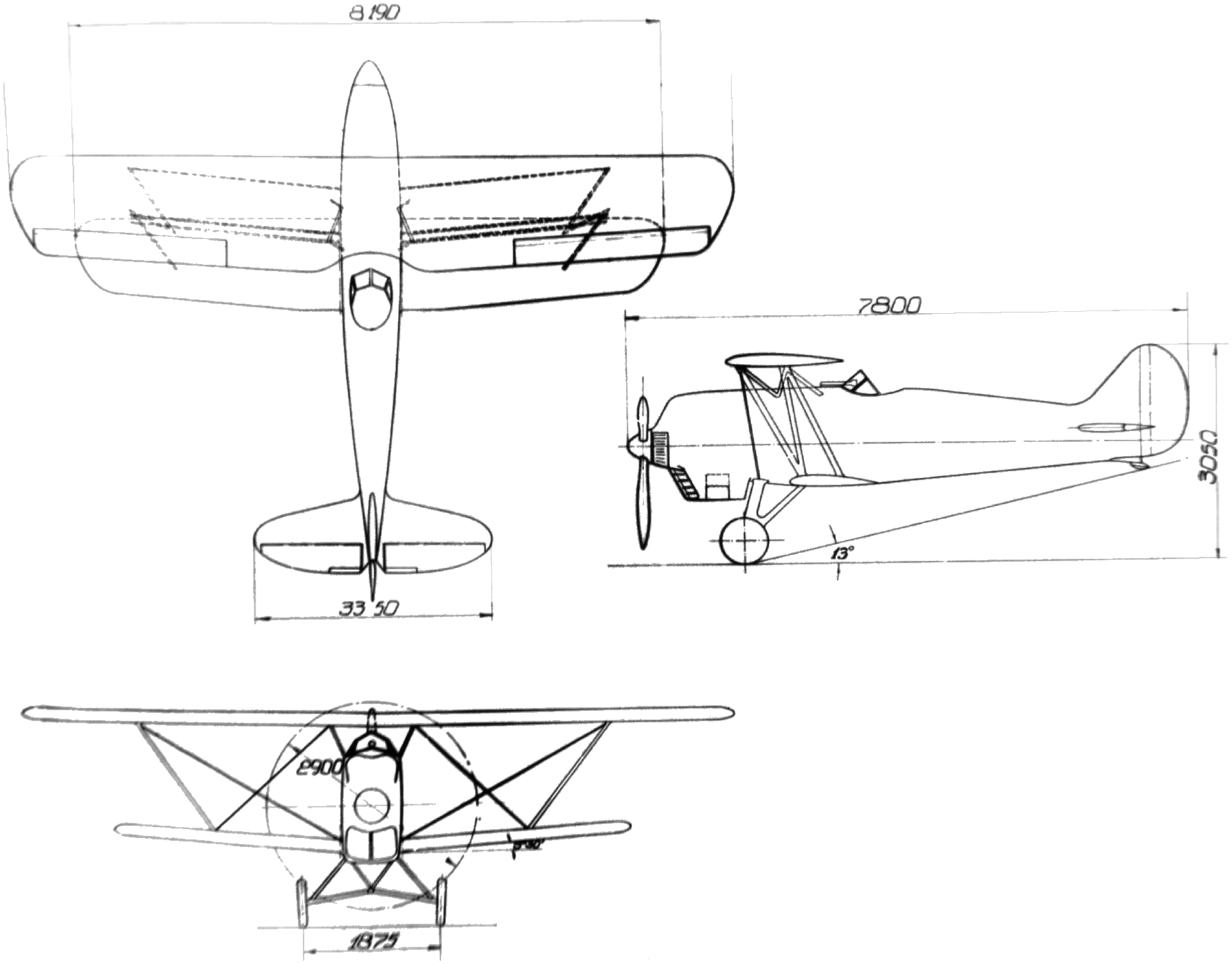
3-view line drawing of the Kawasaki Ki-10

Data from Japanese Aircraft of the Pacific War

General characteristics

- Crew: 1
- Length: 7.2 m (23 ft 7 in)
- Wingspan: 10.02 m (32 ft 10 in)
- Height: 3 m (9 ft 10 in)
- Wing area: 23 m^{2} (250 sq ft)
- Airfoil: NACA M-12
- Empty weight: 1,360 kg (2,998 lb)
- Gross weight: 1,740 kg (3,836 lb)
- Powerplant: × Kawasaki Ha9-IIa V-12 liquid-cooled piston engine, 634 kW (850 hp)
- Propellers: 3-bladed fixed-pitch metal propeller

Performance

- Maximum speed: 400 km/h (250 mph, 220 kn) at 3,000 m (9,800 ft)
- Service ceiling: 11,500 m (37,700 ft)
- Rate of climb: 16.67 m/s (3,300 ft/min)
- Wing loading: 75.7 kg/m^{2} (15.5 lb/sq ft)
- Power/mass: 0.36 kW/kg (0.22 hp/lb)

Armament

- 2 × fixed, forward-firing 7.7 mm (.303 in) Type 89 machine guns

== See also ==
Aircraft of comparable role, configuration, and era

- Arado Ar 68
- Avia B-534
- Blériot-SPAD S.510
- Fairey Fantôme
- Fiat CR.32
- Gloster Gauntlet
- Hawker Fury
- Heinkel He 51
