= List of World War II aces from Japan =

This is a list of fighter aces in World War II from Japan, as officially credited by the Imperial Japanese government. For other countries see List of World War II aces by country.

== Abbreviations ==
- "KIA": Killed in action (dates are included where possible)
- "DOW": Died of wounds
- "KIFA": Killed in Flying Accident
- "MIA": Missing in action
- "POW": Prisoner of War
- "IJA": Imperial Japanese Army
- "IJN": Imperial Japanese Navy

== A ==
Portrait	Name	Kills	Rank	Service	Awards	Notes
	Kenichi Abe (阿部健市)	10 (five jointly)	Chief Petty Officer	IJN		Survived World War II.
	Takahide Aioi (相生高秀)	10	Commander	IJN		5 of the victories during Second Sino-Japan War; later served as Vice Admiral in the JMSDF
	Sadaaki Akamatsu (赤松貞明)	27	Lieutenant Junior Grade	IJN		11 of the victories during Second Sino-Japan War
	Satoru Anabuki (穴吹智)	39	Sergeant Major	IJA		Later served as Lieutenant Colonel in the JGSDF
	Katsumi Anma (安間 克巳)	27		IJA		KIA 8 April 1942
	Yoshitugu Aramaki (荒蒔 義次)	5		IJA		
	Yoshisuke Arita (有田 義助)	5		IJN		
	Mitsuzo Asai	7		IJA		
	Jiro Asano (浅野 二郎)	10		IJA		
	Tomita Atake (阿武 富太)	10		IJN		

== B ==
Portrait	Name	Kills	Rank	Service	Awards	Notes
	Takeo Banno (阪野 隆雄)	10		IJN		KIA 7 October 1943
	Kisaji Beppu	5		IJA		KIA 7 February 1942

== C ==
Portrait	Name	Kills	Rank	Service	Awards	Notes
	Jirō Chōno	7	Ensign	IJN		KIA 21 February 1941

== E ==
Portrait	Name	Kills	Rank	Service	Awards	Notes
	Yuichi Ema (江馬 友一)	6		IJN		KIA 29 October 1944
	Masuaki Endo (遠藤 桝秋)	14		IJN		KIA 7 June 1943
	Sachio Endo (遠藤 幸男)	8		IJN		KIA 14 January 1945
	Toyoki Eto (江藤 豊樹)	12+1 shared +4 probable		IJA		

== F ==
Portrait	Name	Kills	Rank	Service	Awards	Notes
	Iyōzō Fujita (藤田怡与蔵)	11 (42?)		IJN		
	Kihei Fujiwara (藤原 喜平)	5		IJN		
	Sumio Fukuda (福田 澄夫)	11		IJN		KIA 24 October 1944
	Yoshio Fukui	11, 4 probable	Lieutenant	IJN		
	Shigeo Fukumoto (福本 繁夫)	72		IJN		
	Yonesuke Fukuyama	7		IJA		
	Goro Furugori (古郡 吾郎)	25+		IJA		KIA 3 November 1944
	Haruyoshi Furukawa (古川 治良)	5+		IJA		

== G ==
Name	Kills	Rank	Service	Awards	Notes
Hiroshi Gomi	7		IJA		
Kurakazu Goto	8		IJN		KIA 9 September 1943

== H ==
Portrait	Name	Kills	Rank	Service	Awards	Notes
	Matsuo Hagiri (羽切 松雄)	13		IJN		
	Tomio Hanada (花田 富男)	25		IJA		
	Watari Handa	7	Lieutenant Junior Grade	IJN		
	Iwataro Hazawa (羽沢 岩太郎)	15		IJA		KIA 14 January 1945
	Kaname Harada (原田要)	9	Lieutenant Junior Grade	IJN		Died on 3 May 2016
	Kichigoro Haraguchi (原口 吉五郎)	24		IJA		
	Yoshiro Hashiguchi (橋口 嘉郎)	10		IJN		KIA 25 October 1944
	Kazuo Hattori (服部 一夫)	10		IJN		KIA 10 March 1944
	Sakuji Hayashi (林 作次)	6		IJN		KIA 28 May 1945
	Takeomi Hayashi (林 武臣)	7		IJA		
	Yoshishige Hayashi (林 喜重)	5		IJN		KIA 21 April 1945
	Nobuji Negishi (根岸 延次)	6		IJA		
	Hatsuo Hidaka	6	Lieutenant Junior Grade	IJN		
	Yoshimi Hidaka (日高 義巳)	20		IJN		KIA 7.6.1943
	Ichiro Higashiyama (東山 市郎)	9		IJN		
	Yohei Hinoki (ja:檜與平)	12		IJA		Died 1991
	Tomio Hirohata (広畑 富男)	14		IJA		22 April 1945
	Yoshio Hirose (広瀬 吉雄)	7		IJA		22 December 1944
	Minoru Honda (本田 稔)	17		IJN		
	Toshiaki Honda (本田 敏秋)	5+		IJN		13 May 1942
	Mitsuo Hori (堀 光雄)	11		IJN		
	Isamu Hosono (細野 勇)	26		IJA		6 October 1943

== I ==
Name	Kills	Rank	Service	Awards	Notes	
	Chuichi Ichikawa (市川 忠一)	10+		IJA	Bukochosho	KIFA September 1954
	Matao Ichioka (市岡 又夫)	11		IJN		
	Fusata Iida (飯田 房太)	7		IJN		Crashed after being hit at Pearl Harbor
	Masao Iizuka (飯塚 雅夫)	8		IJN		
	Shigeo Iizuka ?					
	Tomesaku Igarashi (五十嵐 留作)	~20		IJA		KIA 17.6.1944
	Fumisuke Ikuno (生野 文介)	6		IJA		
	Hideaki Inayama (稲山 英明)	5+		IJA		
	Misao Inoue (井上 操)	16		IJA		KIFA 15.12.1944
	Teigo Ishida (石田 真吾)	9		IJN		KIA 16.5.1945
	Susumu Ishihara (石原 進)	16		IJN		
	Shizuo Ishii (石井 静夫)	29		IJN		
	Isamu Ishii (石井 勇)	10		IJN		
	Seiji Ishikawa (石川 清治)	5		IJN		
	Tadashi Ishikawa (石川 正)	5		IJA		
	Kanshi Ishikawa (石川 寛志)	19		IJA		
	Chitoshi Isozaki	12	Lieutenant	IJA		
	Ishizuka Tokuyasu	15		IJA		
	Kiyoshi Ito (伊藤 清)	18 & 14 damaged		IJN		
	Fujitaro Ito (伊藤 藤太郎)	13+		IJA		
	Naoyuki Ito (伊藤 直之)	8		IJA		Died 2010
	Susumu Ito	5		IJN		
	Tsutomu Iwai (岩井 勉)	11		IJN		
	Yoshio Iwaki (岩城 芳雄)	8		IJN		
	Tetsuzō Iwamoto (岩本 徹三)	80+	Lieutenant Junior Grade	IJN	Order of the Kite (5th Class), Order of the Rising Sun (7th Class)	
	Iwahashi Jozo	20+		IJA		KIA 23.4.1944
	Hideo Izumi (和泉 秀雄)	9		IJN		KIA 30.5.1942

== J ==
Portrait	Name	Kills	Rank	Service	Awards	Notes
	Ryotaro Jobo (ja:上坊良太郎)	30		IJA		Died 2012

== K ==
Portrait	Name	Kills	Rank	Service	Awards	Notes
	Susumu Kajinami	24				
	Enji Kakimoto	5				POW 27.8.1942, Suicide 5.8.1944 See Cowra breakout
	Morichiki Kamae	32				
	Teizo Kanamaru	8				KIA 24.12.1942
	Keishu Kamihara					
	Sumi Kamito	40+				presumed KIA 4.2.1945
	Moritsugu Kanai					
	Takeo Kanamaru	12				KIA 29.11.1944
	Nobuo Kanazawa	10				
	Masao Kanbara	7				
	Saiji Kanda	9				KIA 19.6.1943
	Masashi Kaneko					
	Tadashi Kaneko	8 (3 in China)	Commander	IJN		KIA 14.11.1942
	Naoshi Kanno	25				presumed KIA 1.8.1945
	Saiji Kani	9				KIA 29.6.1939, Battles of Khalkin Gol/Nomohan
	Tomkazu Kasai	10				
	Isamu Kashiide (ja:樫出勇)	7+2 in China	Captain	IJA	Bukochosho (2nd Class)	
	Shirotaro Kashima	9				KIA 16.12.1944
	Kanichi Kashimura	12	Ensign	IJN	Order of the Golden Kite (5th Class)	KIA 6.3.1943
	Katsue Kato	9				KIA 16.4.1945
	Kenji Kato	9				KIA 5.12.1944
	Kunimichi Kato	16		IJN		
	Tateo Katō (加藤建夫)	18	Lieutenant Colonel; Major General (Posthumously)	IJA	Order of the Golden Kite (Posthumously)	KIA 22.5.1942
	Kiyomi Katsuki (ja:甲木清実)	16	Warrant Officer	IJN		Floatplane ace, 7 victories by F1M2 Pete/A6M2-N Rufe/N1K1 Rex.
	Kosuke Kawahara	8+1 shared				KIA 25.3.1938, Gui'de Airbase, Sino-Japanese War
	Akira Kawakita	5				KIA 26.10.1944
	Koki Kawamoto	8			Bukochosho	
	Masajiro Kawamoto					
	Ichiro Kawamura (河村一郎)	5	Warrant Officer	IJN		Floatplane ace
	Masajiro Kawato	18				
	Tetsuo Kikuchi	12				KIA 19.6.1944
	Takaji Kimura	26				
	Sadamitsu Kimura	8			Bukochosho	KIA 17.4.1945
	Katsuaki Kira	13+9 in China				
	Saburo Kitahata	6+4 in China				KIA 23.1.1943
	Teruhiko Kobayashi	14 (or 5)			Bukochosho	KIFA 4.6.1957
	Hohei Kobayashi	10				KIA 25.1.1944
	Yoshinao Kodaira	9+2 in China		IJN		Died in 2008
	Sada Koga	31				
	Kiyoto Koga	13				KIFA 1938
	Fujikazu Koizumi	11+3 in China				KIA 27.1.1944
	Shizuo Kojima	6				
	Takeichi Kokubun	11				KIA 28.6.1944
	Sadamu Komachi	18	Warrant Officer	IJN		Died 15.7.2012
	Masaichi Kondō	13	Ensign	IJN		
	Kensui Kono	9				
	Kotaro Koyae	15				
	Osamu Kudō	7	Lieutenant Junior Grade	IJN		KIA 3.3.1942
	Shigetoshi Kudō	10	Ensign	IJN		Highest-scoring night fighter ace in the Imperial Japanese Navy. All of his victories were achieved through J1N1-R and J1N1-S Irving.
	Juzo Kuramoto	5+4 in China				KIA 11.10.1942
	Yasuhiko Kuroe	49+2 in China				
	Toshio Kuroiwa	13				
	Tameyoshi Kuroki	16				
	Seiichi Kurosawa	10				KIA 9.6.1945
	Shiro Kurotori (ja:黒鳥四朗)	6	Lieutenant Junior Grade	IJN		Died 4.2.2012
	Yoshiro Kuwabara	13				KIA 14.3.1944

== M ==
Portrait	Name	Kills	Rank	Service	Awards	Notes
	Hideo Maeda	13				KIA 17.2.1944
	Koichi Magara	8				KIA 14.9.1942
	Akio Matsuba	16+2 in China	Lieutenant Junior Grade	IJN		
	Jiro Matsuda	7+2 in China				
	Masao Masuyama	17				
	Morio Matsui	21				KIA 18/05/44
	Susumu Matsuki	6, 2 probable, 3 shared				
	Momoto Matsumura	13				KIA 25.8.1944
	Hidenori Matsunaga	16				KIA 23.4.1945
	Eitoku Matsunaga	16				
	Hidenori Matsunaga					KIA 23/4/45
	Kagemitsu Matsuo	10				KIA 23.12.1943
	Toshio Matsuura	5+10 in China				KIA 2.12.1943
	Yoshimi Minami	6+9 in China	Lieutenant	IJN		KIA in Kamikaze attack 25.11.1944
	Yoshijiro Minegishi	6+3 in China				KIA 6.2.1944
	Masoa Miyamaru ?					
	Goro Miyamoto	26				
	Zenjiro Miyano	16				KIA 16.6.1943
	Masahiro Mitsuda	16				
	Kazunori Miyabe	6				KIA 3.11.1943
	Hideo Miyabe	12				
	Isamu Miyazaki	13				Died 2012
	Gitaro Miyazaki	11+2 in China				KIA 1.6.1942
	Isamu Mochizuki	7	Lieutenant	IJN		KIA Feb 1944 in ground actions
	Mitsugu Mori	5+4 in China	Lieutenant Junior Grade	IJN		Died 1960
	Hideo Morinio	8+1 in China				
	Yutaka Morioka	5				
	Toyoo Moriura	8				KIA 25.10.1942
	Noboru Mune	14				KIA 19.11.1944
	Kazuo Muranaka	7+1 in China				
	Kaneyoshi Muto	23+5 in China	Ensign	IJN		KIA 24.07.1945

== N ==
Portrait	Name	Kills	Rank	Service	Awards	Notes
	Yoshikazu Nagahama	10/13		IJN		KIA 6.9.1943, became ace in a day during the Attack on Darwin
	Kiichi Nagano	19				KIA 6.11.1944
	Yoshimitsu Naka	5				KIA 419/08/44
	Yoshihiko Nakada	45				KIA 9.11.1943
	Kenji Nakagawa	8				
	Tadashi Nakajima	75				
	Bunkichi Nakajima	16				6.10.1943
	Kunimori Nakakariya	16				
	Wataru Nakamichi	15				
	Saburo Nakamura	20				KIA 6/10/44
	Yoshio Nakamura	9				
	Matsumi Nakano	5			Bukochosho	
	Katsujiro Nakano	7				KIA 4.5.1945
	Tomoji Nakano	7				
	Masayuki Nakase	18+9 in China				KIA 1/01/45
	Yoshiichi Nakaya	16				
	Shigeru Nakazaki	16				KIA 23.1.1943
	Kiyoshi Namai	16				
	Mochifumi Nangō	8	Lieutenant	IJN		KIA 18/7/1938
	Shigeo Nango	15				KIA 25/1/1944
	Yashiro Nashiguchi	11				
	Nobuji Negishi	6+7 damaged (all B-29)				KIA 22/04/45
	? Nishikyo	5				
	Hannoshin Nishio	5				
	Shigetsune Nishioka	8				KIA 28/10/1944
	Masaharu Nishiwaki	5				KIA 8/12/44
	Hiroyoshi Nishizawa (西沢広義)	87	Lieutenant Junior Grade (Posthumously)	IJN		KIA 10/26/44, nicknamed "Devil of Rabaul", shot down by F6Fs while a passenger aboard a Ki-49 (aged 24), Mindoro, Philippines
	Yoshinori Noguchi	6				KIA 25/10/1944
	Takeshi Noguchi	14				
	Akiyoshi Nomura	10				

== O ==
Portrait	Name	Kills	Rank	Service	Awards	Notes
	Tsutae Obara	8				KIA 25/7/1945
	Kiichi (Ki-ichi) Oda	5+4 in China	Ensign	IJN		KIA 10/12/1944
	Noritsura Odaka	12				
	Yojiro Ofusa	19				
	Koichi Ogata	7				KIA 8/08/44
	Naoyuki Ogata	5			Bukochosho	
	Makoto Ogawa	9 (7 x B-29s)	Second Lieutenant	IJA	Bukochosho	
	Nobuo Ogiya (ja:荻谷信男)	24				KIA 13/2/1944
	Mitsuo Ogura	16				
	Ryoji Ohara	16 (48?)				
	Hideo Oishi	6				
	Yoshio Oishi	15				KIA 12/12/44
	Kenji Okabe	15	Ensign	IJN		KIA September 1943
	Takashi Okamoto	6				
	Juzo Okamoto	5+4 in China				KIA 11/10/1942
	Hiroshi Okano	19				
	Yoshio Oki	13+4 in China				16/06/43
	Misao Okubu	8				
	Takeo Okumura	50+4 in China	Chief Petty Officer	IJN	Ceremonial Sword	KIA 22/9/1943
	Shokichi Omori	9				
	Shigetaka Ōmori	13	Ensign	IJN		KIA 25/10/1942
	Hiroshi Onazaki	14				6/09/45
	Akira Onozaki	28				
	Megumu Ono	15				KIFA 1/2/1940
	Satoru Ono	5+3 in China	Lieutenant Junior Grade	IJN		Died 2001
	Takeyoshi Ono	8				KIA 30/6/1943
	Takashi Oshibuchi	6				
	Toshio Ota (太田敏夫)	34	Petty Officer 1st Class	IJN		KIA 21/10/1942
	Kyushiro Otake	15				DOW in 1951
	Nakakazu Ozaki (ja:尾崎中和)	19, 12-14 damaged				KIA 27/12/1943
	Yukiharu Ozeki	14+				KIA 24/10/1944

== R ==
Name	Kills	Rank	Service	Awards	Notes
Shinobu Terada	8				

== S ==
Portrait	Name	Kills	Rank	Service	Awards	Notes
	Shogo Saito	26				KIA 2/07/44
	Chiyoshi Saito	7				KIA 2/7/1943
	Saburo Saito	18				
	Toshio Sakagawa	49				KIFA 19/12/1944
	Saburō Sakai (ja:坂井三郎)	~28	Lieutenant Junior Grade	IJN		Died 22/9/2000
	Iori Sakai	9				
	Takao Sakano	10				
	Junichi Sasai (ja:笹井醇一)	26	Lieutenant Junior Grade; Lieutenant Commander (Posthumously)		Order of the Golden Kite	KIA 26/8/1942, nicknamed "Richthofen of Rabaul"
	Tomokazu Sasai	10				
	Yoshiichi Sasaki	6				
	Isamu Sasaki	38			Bukochosho (2nd Class)	
	Masao Sasakibara	12	Ensign	IJN		
	Hitoshi Sato	8				KIA 11/11/1943
	Gonnoshin Sato	5				KIA 11/04/45
	Mitsugu Sawada	12, 1 shared				KIA 5/3/1943
	Eiji Seino	15				
	Hiroshi Sekiguchi	7+1 shared				
	Kiyoshi Sekiya	11				KIA 24/06/44
	Hiroshi Shibagaki	13				KIA 22/1/1944
	Rikio (Rikia) Shibata	13+14 in China				18/12/1944
	Sekizen Shibayama	13				
	Shigeru Shibukawa	15				
	Yoshio Shiga	6	Lieutenant Commander	IJN		
	Masami Shiga	6				
	Yasuhiro Shigematsu	10				KIA 8/7/1944
	Katsuma Shigemi	8				KIA 4/2/1943
	Kenji Shimada	27				MIA 15/9/1939
	Masaaki Shimakawa	8, 12 shared	Warrant Officer	IJN		Died 25/9/1997
	Kiyoshi Shimizu	12				KIA 26/01/45
	Kazuo Shimizu	18				
	Takeshi Shimizu	9				
	Yukio Shimokawa	19				
	Hiromichi Shinohara (ja:篠原弘道)	58	Warrant Officer; Second Lieutenant (Posthumously)	IJA		KIA 27/8/1939, nicknamed "Richthofen of the Orient"
	Toshio Shiozura	20				
	Yoshijiro Shirahama	11				
	Nagao Shirai	13 (including 11 x B-29)				
	Toshihisa Shirakawa	9				KIA 22/9/1943
	Ayao Shirane					
	Naoharu Shiromoto					
	Hironojo Shishimoto					
	Tadashi Shono					
	Tokuya Sudo					
	Toshiyuki Sueda					
	Kazuo Sugino (ja:杉野計雄)					
	Shigeo Sugio					
	Shoichi Sugita (ja:杉田庄一)	70				
	Teruo Sugiyama					
	Motonari Suho					
	Tadao Sumi				Bukochosho (1st Class)	
	Goichi Sumino					
	Minoru Suzuki	8|				
	Hiroshi Suzuki					
	Kiyonobu Suzuki	9	Warrant Officer	IJN		KIA 26.10.1942

== T ==
Portrait	Name	Kills	Rank	Service	Awards	Notes
	Shigeru Takahashi					
	Kenichi Takahashi					
	Katsutaro Takahashi					
	Takeo Takahashi					
	Kaoru Takaiwa					
	Keiji Takamiya					KIA 5/08/44
	Michiho Takarada	up to 7	Warrant Officer	IJN	one Good Conduct stripe	Floatplane rear gunner ace, KIA 27/1/43
	Toraichi Takatsuka					
	Shogo Takeuchi					
	Hiroshi Takiguchi					KIA 8/09/44
	Kuniyoshi Tanaka				Bukochosho	
	Minpo Tanaka					
	Jiro Tanaka					
	Shinsaku Tanaka					
	Masao Taniguchi					
	Takeo Tanimizu (谷水竹雄)					
	Mitsuyoshi Tarui					KIA 6/02/45
	Tadao Tashiro					
	Nobuo Tokushige					
	Yoshihisa Tokuji					
	Kosuke Tsubone					
	Ko Tsuchiya					
	Kazuo Tsunoda	9	Lieutenant Junior Grade	IJN		

== U ==
Portrait	Name	Kills	Rank	Service	Awards	Notes
	Minoru Uchida	10				
	Sadao Uehara	13				
	Kazushi 'Popo' Uto (ja:羽藤一志)	19				KIA 13 September 1942

== W ==
Portrait	Name	Kills	Rank	Service	Awards	Notes
	Yoshio Wajima	11				KIA 23 February 1944
	Yukiyoshi Wakamutsu (ja:若松幸禧)	20				KIA 18 December 1944
	Hideo Watanabe	16				
	Watanabe	6				

== Y ==
Portrait	Name	Kills	Rank	Service	Awards	Notes
	Bunichi Yamaguchi	19				
	Sadao Yamaguchi	12				KIA 4 July 1944
	Fumikazu Yamagushi	19				
	Akira Yamamoto	13	Lieutenant Junior Grade	IJN		KIA 24 November 1944
	Ichirō Yamamoto	11	Ensign	IJN		KIA 19 January 1944
	Tomezo Yamamoto	11				KIA 24 June 1944
	Tadao Yamanaka	9				
	Koshiro Yamashita	11 +1 shared +1 probable				KIA 30/3/1944
	Sahei Yamashita	13				KIA 9 February 1943
	Mitsuo Yamato	8				
	Ichirobei Yamazaki	14				KIA 4 July 1943
	Kenji Yanagiya	8+18 shared	Warrant Officer	IJN		
	Shigeru Yano	8				KIA 17 April 1942
	Kozaburo Yasui	11				KIA 19 June 1944
	Tamotsu Yokoyama (横山保)	5				
	Shokichi Yonekawa					
	Tadayoshi Yonekawa	6				KIFA
	Katsuyoshi Yoshida	10				
	Mototsuna Yoshida	14				KIA 7 August 1942
	Yoshio Yoshida	6+1 probable	Captain	IJA	Bukochosho	
	Hiroji Yoshihara	8				
	Keisaku Yoshimura	10				KIA 25 October 1942
	Satoshi Yoshino	15				KIA 9 June 1942
	Yoshitaro Yoshioka	6				
	Tokushige Yoshizawa	9				KIA 6 January 1945
	Yoshito Yasuda					
	Kozaburo Yasui					

== See also ==
- List of Japanese Navy Air Force aces (Mitsubishi A6M)
