= List of Japanese Navy Air Force aces (Mitsubishi A6M) =

This is a list of Imperial Navy Air aces flying the Mitsubishi Zero fighter during the Pacific War.

== Aces ==
- Tetsuzō Iwamoto: 94 (including 14 in China / personal diary details 202 kills)
- Shoichi Sugita: 70 (some sources say 80)
- Saburō Sakai: 64 (2 in China)
- Takeo Okumura: 54 (4 in China)
- Hiroyoshi Nishizawa: 36 official (102 claimed)
- Toshio Ohta: 34
- Kazuo Sugino: 32
- Junichi Sasai: 27
- Sito Origami: 10 (9 in China, 1 disputed)
- Toshiyuki Sueda: 9
- Kunio Iwashita

== Other Navy Aces ==
Air Aces in A6M-2N Rufe floatplane fighter:

- Master Sergeant Kawai: 4
- Master Sergeant Maruyama: 4

Air Aces in metropolitan defense (over Japan):

- Captain-Petty Officer Takeo Tanimizu: 8 (in an A6M5c fighter)
- Ensign Kaneyoshi Muto: 4 (with Kawanishi N1K2-J Shiden-Kai "George 21", he fought against 12 F6F Hellcats, shot down four of them and forced the remaining eight to retreat)

== Air aces over China (1937-1941) ==
The unit for operative evaluations was the Yokosuka air corps, but it transferred its responsibility to 12th Rengo Kōkūtai under the command of Captain Kiichiro Hasegawa when this group was sent to China. Commanders and pilots of the unit:

- Operative Commanders
  - Tadashi Kaneko: 2 (final total 8)
  - Tamotsu Yokoyama
  - Saburo Shindo
  - Ayao Shirane: 1 (final total 11)
- Petty officers
  - Akio Matsuba: 2 (final total 18)
  - Jirō Chōno †: 7
  - Koshiro Yamashita: 5 (final total 10)
  - Saburo Kitabatake: 2 (final total 10)
  - Kihei Fujiwara: 4
  - Yoshio Ohki: 4
  - Masayuki Mitsumasa: 2
  - Tsutomu Iwai: 3 (final total 11)
  - Toraichi Takatsuka: 3
  - Kazuki Mikami: 2
  - Masaharu Miramoto: 1
  - Toshiyuki Sueda: 1 (final total 10)
  - Hatsuyama Yamaya: 2

This group suffered the loss of Eichi Kimura and Kichiro Kobayashi from enemy anti-aircraft fire. This unit remained under the command of Admiral Shigetarō Shimada when he led the China Air Area Fleet in the Chinese campaign.

== Famous air units ==
The unit (Kōkūtai—"air group") with the most air aces, was the Tainan Kōkūtai (in Formosa), the most famous group. They operated from Rabaul, New Britain and acquired their legendary fame over Taihoku (the Philippines), the Dutch East Indies, Lae and Buna (New Guinea) and, in the last stages of the war, in defense of mainland Japan. Saburō Sakai was another member in this unit after Dutch Indies operations, from the Denpasar base on Bali.

Other famous units with air aces were the 3rd Air Corps (including Yoshiro Hashiguchi), 253rd Air Corps (with Tetsuzō Iwamoto and Hiroyoshi Nishizawa among its members), Genzan Air Group, and other groups.

The Imperial Japanese Navy Air Service, similar to the German Luftwaffe idea of organizing an "all aces" select unit Jagdverband 44 equipped with Messerschmitt Me 262A-1a jet fighters, decided to create an all-ace unit (the 343 Kōkūtai) with Kawanishi N1K2-J fighters towards the end of the conflict; this was commanded by Minoru Genda.

== See also ==
- List of World War II aces from Japan

== Bibliography ==
- Hata, Ikuhiko Japanese Naval Air Force Fighter Units and Their Aces, 1932-1945 (Casemate Publishers, First Edition, 1 June 2011) ISBN 978-19-06502-84-3
