= Tateo =

- Gender: Male

Origin
- Origin: Japanese
- Meaning: Different meanings depending on the kanji used

Tateo (written: 健夫 or 建夫) is a masculine Japanese given name. Notable people with the name include:

- Tateo Katō (加藤 建夫; 1903–1942), Japanese World War II flying ace
- Tateo Ozaki (尾崎 健夫; born 1954), Japanese golfer
