= Mitsugu =

- Gender: Male

Origin
- Origin: Japanese
- Meaning: Different meanings depending on the kanji used

Mitsugu (written: 貢, 女貢 or みつぐ in hiragana) is a masculine Japanese given name. Notable people with the name include:

- Chiyonofuji Mitsugu (千代の富士 貢; 1955–2016), Japanese sumo wrestler
- Mitsugu Ihara (庵原 貢; 1903–1979), Japanese naval officer
- Mitsugu Mori (森 貢; 1908–1962), Japanese World War II flying ace
- Mitsugu Nomura (野村 貢; born 1956), Japanese footballer
- Mitsugu Ōnishi (大西 みつぐ; born 1952), Japanese photographer
- Mitsugu Saotome (早乙 女貢; 1926–2008), pen-name of Kanegai Hideyoshi, Japanese writer
- Mitsugu Sarudate (猿館 貢; born 1962), Japanese cyclist
