= Yoshimi =

- Pronunciation: (YOH-shee-mee)
- Gender: Unisex

Origin
- Origin: Japanese
- Meaning: Depends on the kanji used
- Region of origin: Japan

Other names
- Related names: Yoshiko

Yoshimi is a unisex Japanese given name and can also be used as a surname.

== Written forms ==
Forms in kanji can include:

- 佳美, meaning "excellent, beautiful"
- 良美, meaning "good, beautiful"
- 好美, meaning "like, beautiful"
- 芳美, meaning "fragrant, beautiful"

== People with the given name ==
- Yoshimi (吉見), a guitarist and composer from the pop rock band Funta
- Yoshimi Ashikawa (芦川 よしみ; born 1958), Japanese actress and singer
- Yoshimi Goda (合田 良実; 1935–2012), Japanese Coastal Engineer
- Yoshimi Hayashi (1923–2006), American lawyer
- Yoshimi Ishibashi (石橋 義三; born 1949), Japanese professional race car driver
- Yoshimi Iwasaki (岩崎 良美; born 1961), Japanese actress and singer
- Yoshimi Kobayashi (小林 良美; born 1968), Japanese softball player
- Yoshimi Masaki (正木 嘉美; born 1962), Japanese judoka
- Yoshimi Minami (南 義美; 1915–1944), Japanese ace fighter pilot
- Yoshimi Nishida (西田 祥実; 1892–1944), Japanese general
- Yoshimi Osawa (大澤 慶巳; 1926–2022), Japanese judoka
- Yoshimi Ozaki (尾崎 好美; born 1981), Japanese long-distance runner
- Yoshimi Takeuchi (竹内 好; 1910–1977), Japanese Sinologist
- Yoshimi Uchida (内田 善美; born 1953), Japanese manga artist
- Yoshimi Usui (臼井 吉見; 1905–1987), Japanese writer and critic
- Yoshimi Yamashita (山下 良美; born 1986), Japanese football referee
- Yoshimi P-We or Yoshimi Yokota (横田 佳美, born 1968), a Japanese musician and drummer of the rock band Boredoms
- Yoshimi Watanabe (渡辺 喜美; born 1952), Japanese politician

== People with the surname ==
- Naho Yoshimi (吉見 菜保; born 1972), Japanese ice hockey player
- Shunya Yoshimi (吉見 俊哉; born 1957), Japanese sociologist
- Yoshiaki Yoshimi (吉見 義明; born 1946), Japanese professor

== Fictional characters ==
- Agent Yoshimi, a character from the television series Duck Dodgers
- Yoshimi Akashi (明石 好美), a character from the manga series Zettai Karen Children and its anime adaptions
- Yoshimi, a minor character in the manga and anime series Di Gi Charat
- Yoshimi Ibaraki, a character from the game Blue Archive
- Yoshimi Sakanaka (阪中 佳実), a character from the Haruhi Suzumiya series
- Yoshimi Satou (佐藤良美), a character from the video game and anime Tsuyokiss
- Yoshimi Yahagi (矢作好美), a character in the novel, film, and manga Battle Royale
- Yoshimi, title character of The Flaming Lips 2002 album, and song of the same name, Yoshimi Battles the Pink Robots

== See also ==
- Yoshimi Battles the Pink Robots, a 2002 album by The Flaming Lips
