= Matsuba =

Matsuba may refer to:

- Matsuba Station, a train station in Akita Prefecture, Japan
- Matsuba-kai, a yakuza organization based in Tokyo, Japan

== People with the surname ==
- Akio Matsuba (松場 秋夫, 1914–?), Japanese World War II flying ace
- Takahiro Matsuba (松葉 貴大, born 1990), Japanese baseball player
