= Kiyonobu Suzuki =

Kiyonobu Suzuki may refer to:

- Kiyonobu Suzuki (pilot) (鈴木 清延, 1914–1942), Japanese World War II flying ace
- Kiyonobu Suzuki (voice actor) (鈴木 清信, born 1950), Japanese voice actor
