= Ichirō Yamamoto =

Japanese World War II flying ace

- 山本 一郎
- Born: 1918; Ehime Prefecture, Japan
- Died: June 19, 1944 (aged 25–26); Philippine Sea
- Military career
- Allegiance: Empire of Japan
- Branch: Imperial Japanese Navy Air Service (IJN)
- Service years: 1935 – 1944
- Rank: Ensign
- Units: Ōita Air Group; Sasebo Air Group; Zuihō; Shōkaku; Zuikaku
- Conflicts: World War II; Attack on Pearl Harbor; Indian Ocean raid; Battle of the Coral Sea; Battle of the Santa Cruz Islands; Battle of the Philippine Sea †

Ichirō Yamamoto (山本 一郎, Yamamoto Ichiro; 1918 – June 19, 1944) was an ace fighter pilot in the Imperial Japanese Navy during World War II. Participating in many of the Pacific War battles and campaigns as a member of several units, Yamamoto was officially credited with destroying 11 enemy aircraft. He was killed in aerial combat with American carrier fighters on June 19, 1944, during the Battle of the Philippine Sea.
