= Kato hayabusa sento-tai =

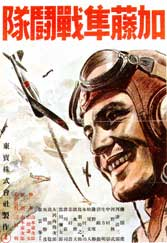
- Japanese movie poster
- Directed by: Kajirō Yamamoto
- Written by: Kajirō Yamamoto
- Production company: Toho
- Release date: March 9, 1944 (Japan)
- Running time: 111 minutes
- Country: Japan
- Language: Japanese

Kato hayabusa sento-tai (Japanese: 加藤隼戦闘隊), a.k.a. Colonel Tateo Katō's Flying Squadron (64th Sentai) or Colonel Kato's Falcon Squadron, is a 1944 black and white Japanese film directed by Kajirō Yamamoto.

A war film detailing the missions of a squadron in the Imperial Japanese Army Air Service, this film features special effects directed by Eiji Tsuburaya, best known for his work on the Godzilla and Ultraman franchises.

== Cast ==
- Susumu Fujita as Tateo Katō
