= Tateo Katō =

- 加藤 建夫
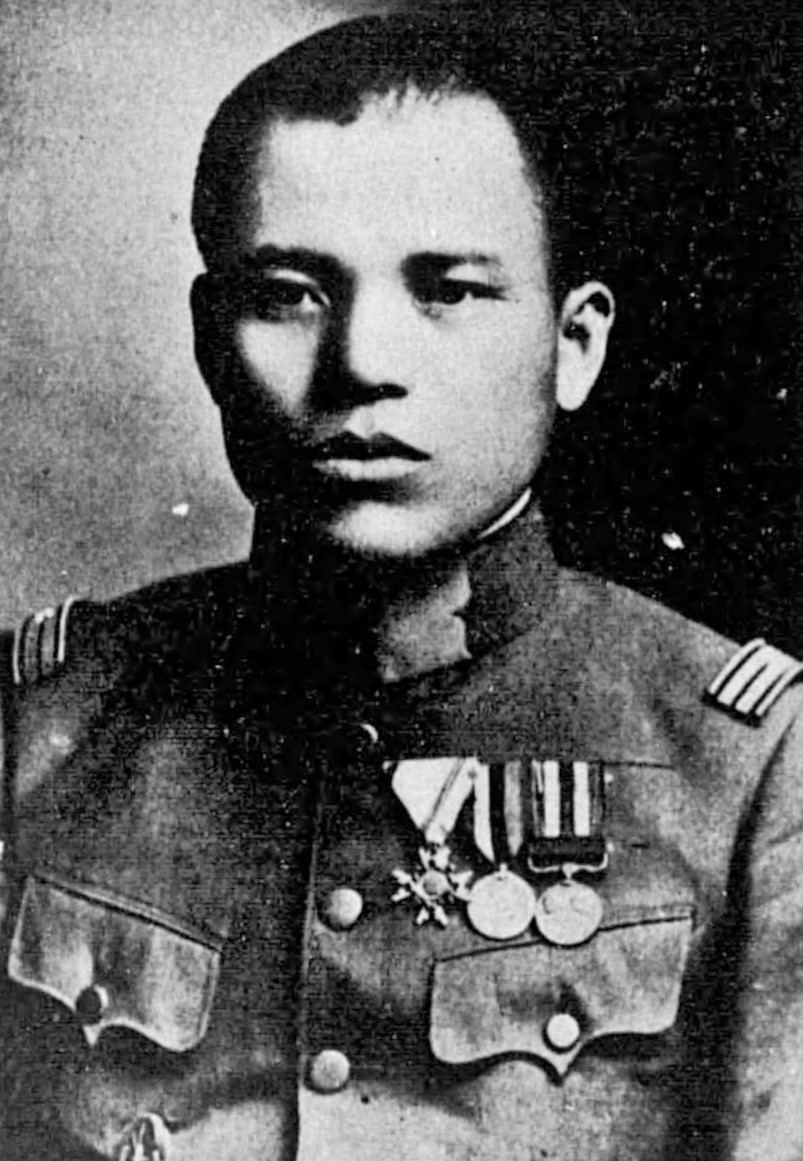
- Born: September 28, 1903; Asahikawa, Hokkaido, Japan
- Died: May 22, 1942 (aged 38); Bay of Bengal
- Military career
- Allegiance: Empire of Japan
- Branch: Imperial Japanese Army
- Service years: 1925–1942
- Rank: Major General (posthumous)
- Unit: Imperial Japanese Army Air Service
- Commands: 64th Sentai
- Conflicts: Second Sino-Japanese War; World War II
- Awards: Order of the Golden Kite

Tateo Katō (加藤 建夫, Katō Tateo; September 28, 1903 – May 22, 1942) was a Japanese ace army aviator, credited with at least 18 aerial victories and who was honored posthumously by an award of the Order of the Golden Kite.

== Biography ==
Katō was born and raised in present-day Asahikawa, Hokkaidō. His father Sergeant Tetsuzo Katō was killed in the Russo-Japanese War. He graduated from the 37th class of the Imperial Japanese Army Academy in 1925, and enrolled in the Tokorozawa Flying School two years later.

In May 1927, he was posted to the 6th Hiko Rentai (flight regiment) in Heijō, Chōsen. His flying skill with the Kawasaki Ko-4 biplane fighter (a license-built Nieuport-Delage NiD 29) was so outstanding that he was selected to become a flight instructor at Tokorozawa in 1928. In 1932, Katō was promoted to head instructor at the Akeno Flying School, the premier air academy for the Imperial Japanese Army Air Force. In 1936, Kato became commander of the 5th Rentai, and with the outbreak of the Second Sino-Japanese War in 1937, he became commander of the 2nd Daitai, equipped with Kawasaki Ki-10 "Perry" biplane fighters, which achieved a level of air superiority in operations over northern China. On 25 March 1938, during the Battle of Taierzhuang, Capt. Katō led the 1st Chutai of the 2nd Daitai with 1Lt. Kosuke Kawahara leading the 2nd Chutai on an attack over Gui'de Airbase and claimed over a dozen Chinese Air Force I-15bis shot down, however, his co-commander 1Lt. Kawahara was himself shot down and killed; distraught at the loss, Katō shaved-off his signature moustache the following morning. His unit's Type 95 fighters were being replaced by the new Type 97 fighters the following month. Katō claimed nine Chinese fighters during his rotation, making him the top-scoring Army pilot in China during the period 1937–1941.

Katō returned to Japan in 1939 to attend the Army Staff College and was assigned to the headquarters staff of the Imperial Japanese Army General Staff. He also visited Europe on assignment, together with General Hisaichi Terauchi, and inspected the Luftwaffe in Germany. During this period, he was also promoted to major.

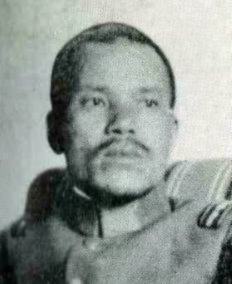
Japanese ace Tateo Katō

In 1941, with the start of the Pacific War, Katō was again given a combat command – this time as commander of the 64th Sentai, based at Guangzhou, China, and equipped with the latest Nakajima Ki-43 Hayabusa fighters. His unit participated in the early stages of the war, especially distinguishing itself during the Battle of Malaya. The 64th Sentai was based at Duong Dong airfield on Phu Quoc Island to provide cover for the Japanese invasion fleet bound for Malaya, and to attack ground targets in Malaya and Burma. The 64th Sentai had its first combat experience against the Flying Tigers on 25 December 1941, escorting a bomber raid on Rangoon. Under Katō's command, the unit recorded over 260 aerial victories over Allied aircraft. He disallowed individual victory credits for the sake of teamwork. Katō was promoted to lieutenant colonel in February 1942.

On May 22, 1942, while over the Bay of Bengal, Katō was killed in action while attacking a flight of No. 60 Squadron RAF Bristol Blenheim bombers. As Kato pulled up after making his first diving pass on the Blenheims, turret gunner Flight Sergeant "Jock" McLuckie raked the fighter's exposed belly with a long burst and the Ki-43 started to burn and crashed into the sea. Katō was posthumously promoted two steps in rank to major general, and was honored by a special State Shinto ceremony at Tokyo's Yasukuni Shrine as a "god of war" in mid-October 1942.

Katō's heroism had considerable propaganda value, and the Japanese government sponsored a movie titled Kato hayabusa sento-tai (加藤隼戦闘隊) (1944) glorifying his life story.

== See also ==
- Japanese invasion of Malaya
- List of World War II aces from Japan
