= Hiromichi Shinohara =

Japanese World War II fighter pilot

- 篠原 弘道
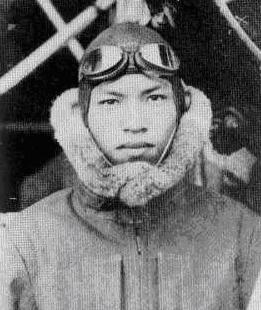
- Born: 1 August 1913; Suzumenomiya, Utsunomiya, Tochigi
- Died: 27 August 1939 (aged 26); Mohorehi Lake, 10km south of Abdara Lake
- Military career
- Allegiance: Empire of Japan
- Branch: Imperial Japanese Army Air Service
- Service years: 1933–1939
- Rank: Second lieutenant
- Nickname: "The Richthofen of the Orient"
- Units: 1st Chutai, 11th Sentai
- Conflicts: Battle of Khalkhin Gol

Hiromichi Shinohara (篠原 弘道, Shinohara Hiromichi; 1 August 1913 – 27 August 1939) was the highest-scoring fighter ace of the Imperial Japanese Army Air Service (IJAAF). On 27 June 1939 he set a Japanese record by downing 11 planes on a single day. He was shot down and killed on 27 August 1939, having claimed 58 victories in only three months of combat. He scored all his aerial victories while flying a Nakajima Ki-27.

== Early life ==
Hiromichi Shinohara was born in August 1913 on a farm in Suzumenomiya, near Utsunomiya in the Tochigi Prefecture. After finishing his formal education he went into military service, joining the 27th Cavalry Regiment in 1931. In that capacity he took part in the Japanese invasion of Manchuria and was involved in the Jiangqiao Campaign in April 1932.

== Imperial Japanese Army Air Force career ==
In June 1933 Shinohara went to the Tokorozawa Flying School (Tokorozawa Rikugun Koku Seibi Gakkō), graduating in January 1934. He was enlisted as a corporal in the 1st Chutai of the 11th Hiko Datai, and was posted to Harbin in Manchukuo (Manchuria). By the end of 1938 he had climbed through the ranks, becoming a warrant officer. He was 25 years old and had six years of flying experience by the time the Nomonhan Incident (Battles of Khalkhin Gol) began in May 1939.

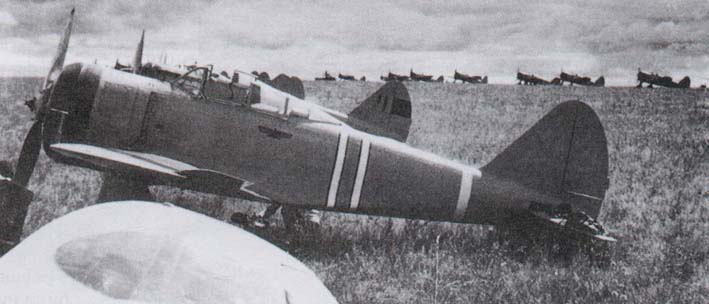
A Ki-27 as used in the Battle of Khalkhin Gol.

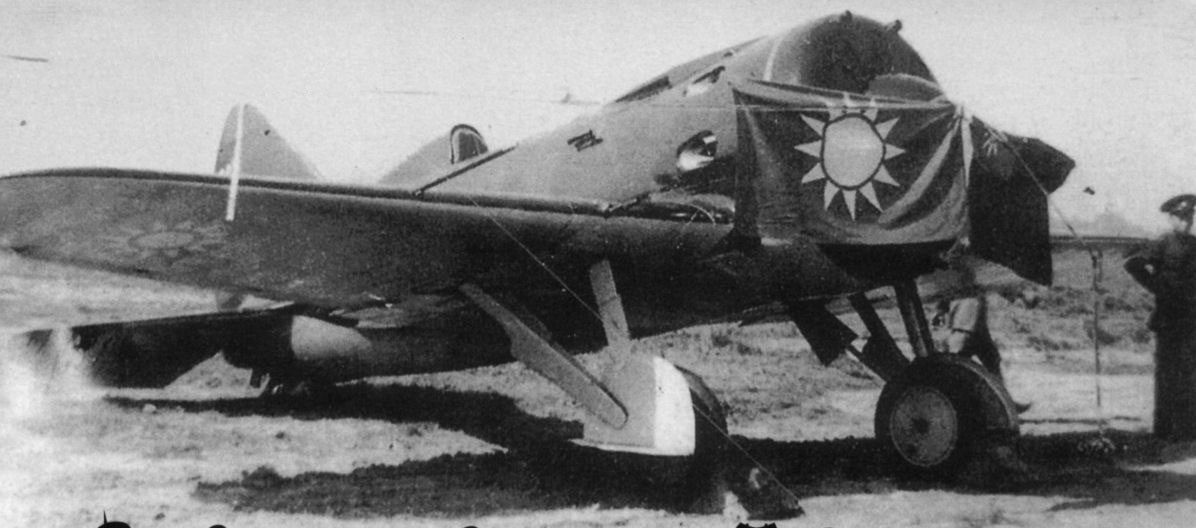
A Polikarpov I-16 as used in the Battle of Khalkhin Gol, here with Chinese insignia.

During his first combat sortie, on 27 May 1939, Shinohara, flying a Nakajima Ki-27, downed four USSR Polikarpov I-16 fighters. He became an ace within 24 hours, after he claimed six more victories, downing a Polikarpov R-Z reconnaissance plane and five Polikarpov I-15 biplane fighters. No other pilot in history scored 10 victories during his first day of combat. From then on his victories continued, culminating on 27 June 1939 in an Imperial Japanese Army Air Force record of eleven victories in a single day during an air battle over Tamsak-Bulak. Only top ace of all time Erich Hartmann (11), Emil Lang (18), Hans-Joachim Marseille (17), Erich Rudorffer (13 in 17 minutes), August Lambert (17), Hubert Strassl (15), Wilhelm Batz (15), Johannes Wiese (12), Franz Schall (11 and 13) have surpassed him.

Shinohara's luck however ran out on him two months later when on 27 August 1939 he himself was shot down by USSR Polikarpov I-16 fighters after claiming three victories during a bombing escort mission. His aircraft fell in flames into Mohorehi Lake, ten kilometres south of Abdara Lake. Warrant Officer Hiromichi Shinohara was posthumously promoted to the rank of second lieutenant, having claimed 58 victories in only three months of combat—the last three in the battle that would take him down—earning him the nickname of the Richthofen of the Orient.

== See also ==
- Nakajima Ki-27
- Battle of Khalkhin Gol
- List of World War II aces from Japan
- List of World War II air aces
