= Takeo Okumura =

Japanese fighter ace

- 奥村 武雄
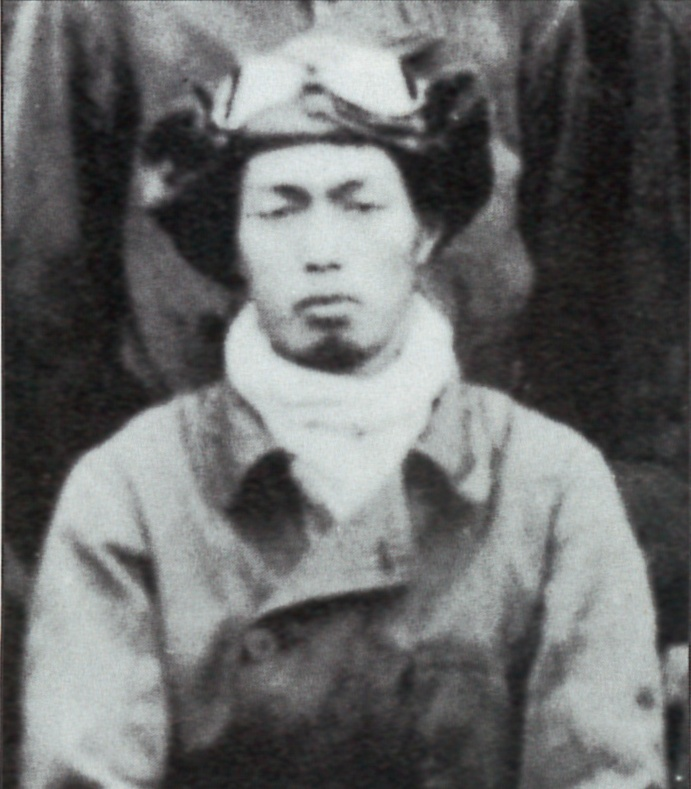
- Okumura in Nov 1942 with the 251 Air Group at Rabaul
- Born: February 1920; Fukui Prefecture, Japanese Empire
- Died: 22 September 1943 (aged 23); Solomon Sea, off Cape Cretin, Territory of New Guinea
- Military career
- Allegiance: Empire of Japan
- Branch: Imperial Japanese Navy Air Service (IJN)
- Service years: 1935-1943
- Rank: Chief Petty Officer
- Units: 14th Air Group; Ryujo fighter Corps; Tainan Air Group(251st Air Group); 201st Air Group
- Conflicts: Second Sino-Japanese War; World War II; Pacific War; Battle of the Eastern Solomons; Solomon Islands campaign

Takeo Okumura (奥村 武雄, Okumura Takeo; February 1920 – 22 September 1943) was an ace fighter pilot in the Imperial Japanese Navy (IJN) during the Second Sino-Japanese War and the Pacific theater of World War II.

== Biography ==
Okumura was born in Fukui Prefecture, Japan in February 1920. He enlisted in the Navy in 1935, started Air Corps training in February 1938, and graduated in September.

During the Second Sino-Japanese War, he was assigned to the 14th Air Group of northern French Indochina in 1940. His first battle was 7 October 1940. This day, 27 G3M "Nells" escorted by 7 A6M2 "Zeros" of the 14th Air Group, attacked the Kunming. In aerial combat, 7 Zeros were shot down, as well as 13 I-15s of the China Air Force. Okumura shot down four I-15s.

In 1942, after the start of World War II, Okumura was assigned to the carrier Ryujo fighter Corps. He fought in the Battle of the Eastern Solomons on 24 August 1942. He covered the squadron attacking the enemy fleet. He became missing during the fierce fighting, and was for a time thought to have been killed in action.

Then, Okumura was assigned to the Tainan Air Group based in Rabaul. He recorded 14 shot down enemy aircraft in the Solomons in the period before returning to Japan in December. Okumura returned to Rabaul in July 1943 as a member of the 201st Air Group. He shot down 10 enemy aircraft in the interception role against the sky Buin on 14 September. After the battle, Admiral Jinichi Kusaka, commander of 11th Air Fleet at Rabaul, presented him with a ceremonial sword for distinguished service.

Okumura was assigned to escort bombers for the enemy convoy attack off Cape Cretin, New Guinea on 22 September. He was killed after starting a dogfight with a P-38 and a P-40.

At the time of his death, Okumura's rank was Petty Officer First Class but he received a posthumous promotion to Chief Petty Officer. His formal number of kills is unknown, because IJN did not disclose the number of kills in 1943 and later. Henry Sakaida estimated that Okumura certainly shot down 4 aircraft in China and about 50 aircraft in the Solomons.
