= Yoshimi Minami =

Japanese World War II flying ace

- 南 義美
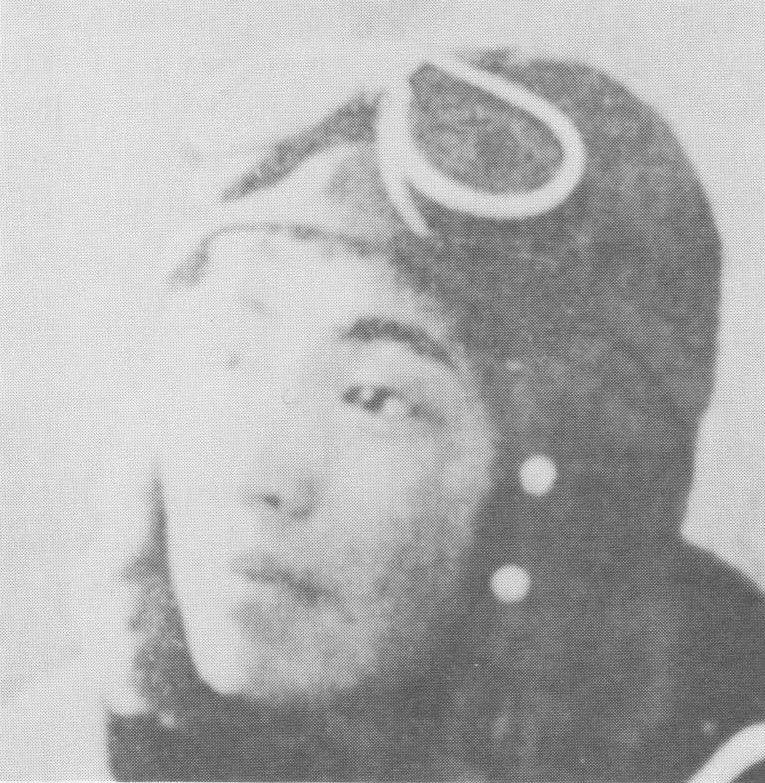
- Born: December 15, 1915; Kagawa Prefecture, Japan
- Died: November 25, 1944 (aged 28); Second Philippine Republic
- Military career
- Allegiance: Empire of Japan
- Branch: Imperial Japanese Navy Air Service (IJN)
- Service years: 1933–1944
- Rank: Lieutenant
- Units: 13th Air Group; Ōmura Air Group; 12th Air Group; Saeki Air Group; Ōita Air Group; Hiryū; Zuihō; Shōkaku; 601st Air Group; Taihō; 653rd Air Group; Kasagi Unit
- Conflicts: Second Sino-Japanese War; World War II; Attack on Pearl Harbor; Indian Ocean raid; Battle of the Coral Sea; Battle of the Philippine Sea; Battle of Leyte Gulf; Battle of Leyte

Yoshimi Minami (南 義美, Minami Yoshimi; December 15, 1915 – November 25, 1944) was an ace fighter pilot in the Imperial Japanese Navy (IJN) during World War II. Participating in many of the Pacific War battles and campaigns as a member of several units, Minami was officially credited with destroying 15 enemy aircraft. He was killed in November 1944 attempting to crash his aircraft into enemy ships off Leyte as a participant in Kamikaze operations.
