= Shangqiu Airport =

Shangqiu Airport 商丘机场
- IATA: none; ICAO: none

Summary
- Airport type: Public / Military
- Serves: Shangqiu, Henan, China
- Location: Guantang Township, Liangyuan District
- Coordinates: 34°26′59″N 115°27′30″E

Map
- Location of airport in Henan Province

Shangqiu Airport (Chinese: 商丘机场), or Shangqiu Air Base, is a military air base near the city of Shangqiu in China's Henan Province. It is located in Guantang Township, Liangyuan District, 16 kilometres (9.9 mi) west of the city center. The airport was built in the 1930s and was known as Gui'de (Chinese: 归德 wg: Kwei-teh) Airbase, and served in national defense operations during the Sino-Japanese War, and the planning as of the 2000s is to convert the air base into a dual-use military and civil airport with an estimated investment of 500 million, and commercial operations of the airport estimated to serve 300,000 passengers and 1,000 tons of cargo per year by 2020.

== History ==
In March-April 1938, the Nationalist Air Force of China staged the 3rd and 4th Fighter-Attack Group squadrons at Gui'de (w.g. Kwei-teh, now Shangqiu) Airbase to ground-support operations at the Battle of Taierzhuang; I-15 fighter pilots Lt. Chen Huaimin and Lt. Zhang Guangming were both outnumbered by superior numbers of Imperial Japanese Army Air Force Ki-10 fighters and although Lt. Chen shot-down one Ki-10, he rammed another, taking both the enemy and his own plane down, and then parachuting to safety with a bullet-wound in his leg, while Lt. Zhang fought against six Ki-10s, and was ultimately shot-down, but managed to also parachute to safety, and the two pilots would reunite through the assistance of local villagers later on the ground, and return safely to Gui'de/Shangqiu Airbase. Air battles would however, continue to rage over Gui'de/Shangqiu Airbase even as the Battle of Taierzhuang was already won; top IJAAF fighter ace 1Lt. Kosuke Kawahara of the 2nd Chutai/2nd Datai fought an air battle over Gui'de/Shangqiu Airbase, shooting down two Chinese I-15s, but he was himself shot down and killed over Gui'de/Shangqiu Airbase on 25 March 1938. Lt. Zhang Mingsheng of the 21st PS, 4th PG surprise-attacked an enemy fighter and shooting it down on 10 April 1938 in defense of the airbase, but was quickly jumped by others, and his I-15 fighter was shot-up, making a crash-landing, nonetheless surviving to fight again.

== See also ==
- List of airports in China
- List of the busiest airports in China
- List of People's Liberation Army Air Force airbases
- Aircraft of China both civil and military use from 1937 and before
