= Nakajima A2N =

1930s Japanese carrier-based fighter aircraft

A2N
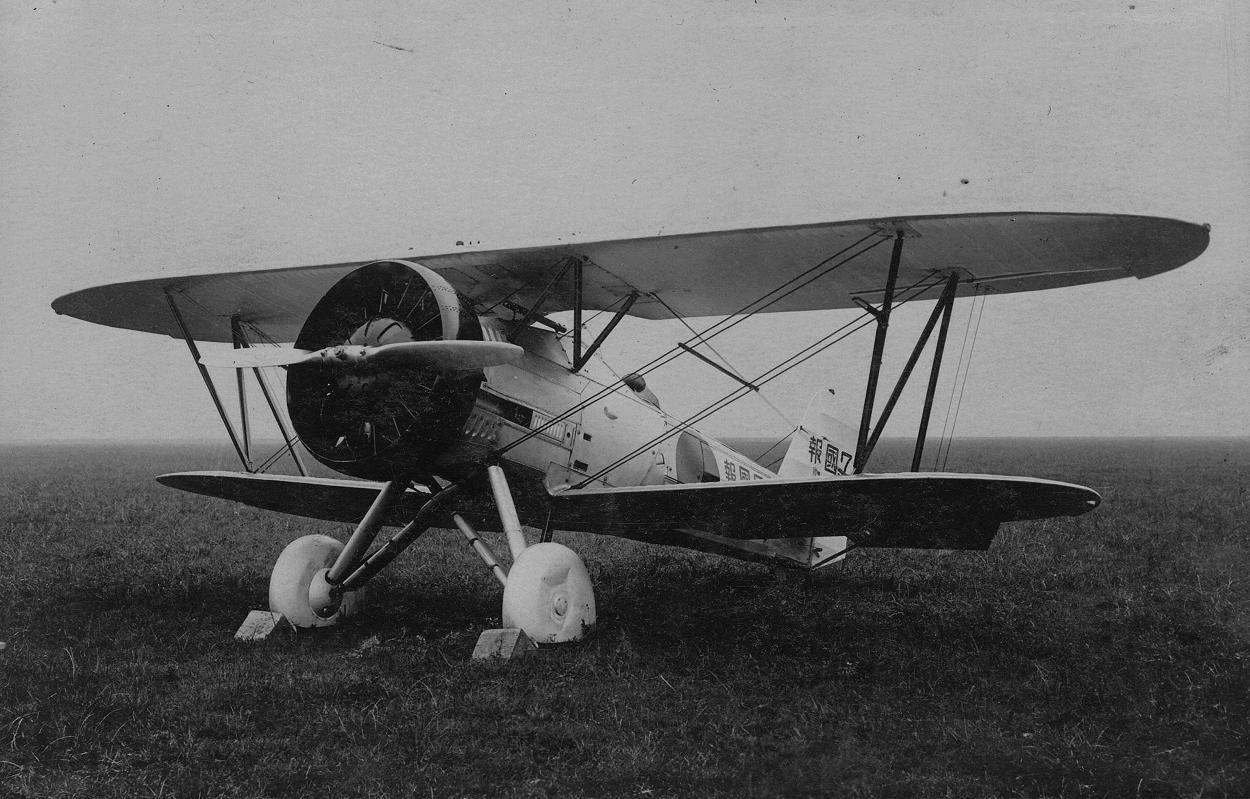
- A2N1

General information
- Type: Carrier-borne fighter
- Manufacturer: Nakajima Aircraft Company
- Designer: Takao Yoshida
- Primary user: Imperial Japanese Navy
- Number built: approx 100 (A2N) + 66 (A3N)

History
- Manufactured: 1932–1936 (A2N)
- Introduction date: 1932
- First flight: 1929
- Developed into: Nakajima A4N

The Nakajima A2N or Navy Type 90 Carrier Fighter was a Japanese carrier-borne fighter of the 1930s. It was a single-engined biplane of mixed construction with a fixed tailwheel undercarriage.

== Design and development ==
The A2N was originally developed as a private venture by Nakajima for the Imperial Japanese Navy. It was based loosely on the Boeing Model 69 and Boeing Model 100, examples of both having been imported in 1928 and 1929 respectively. Takao Yoshida led the design team, and two prototypes, designated Navy Type 90 Carrier Fighter in anticipation of Navy acceptance, were ready by December 1929. Powered by Bristol Jupiter VI engines, these were rejected as not being regarded as offering a significant improvement over the Nakajima A1N.

Jingo Kurihara carried out a major redesign, and another prototype, the A2N1, powered by a 432 kW (579 hp) Nakajima Kotobuki 2, was completed in May 1931. The type was adopted by the Navy in April 1932.

A two-seat trainer, the A3N3-1 (Navy Type 90 Training Fighter), was later developed from the Navy Type 90 Carrier Fighter, and sixty-six of these were built between 1936-39.

The A4N was developed from this aircraft, which entered service later in the 1930s.

== Operational history ==
In 1932, Minoru Genda formed a flight demonstration team known as "Genda's Flying Circus" to promote naval aviation and flew this type. The Navy Type 90 Carrier-based fighter flew from the Hōshō, Kaga and Ryūjō. On what would become the first air battles of the Second Sino-Japanese War-Second World War for the air-combat units of these aircraft carriers, A2N fighter pilot Akio Matsuba from Kaga, flying air-cover in support of Japanese troop-landings in the Battle of Shanghai on 16 August 1937, shot-down a Chinese Air Force Douglas O-2M on an attack mission against Japanese forces in Shanghai. A2Ns were soon completely superseded by the A4Ns and A5Ms fighters.

== Variants ==
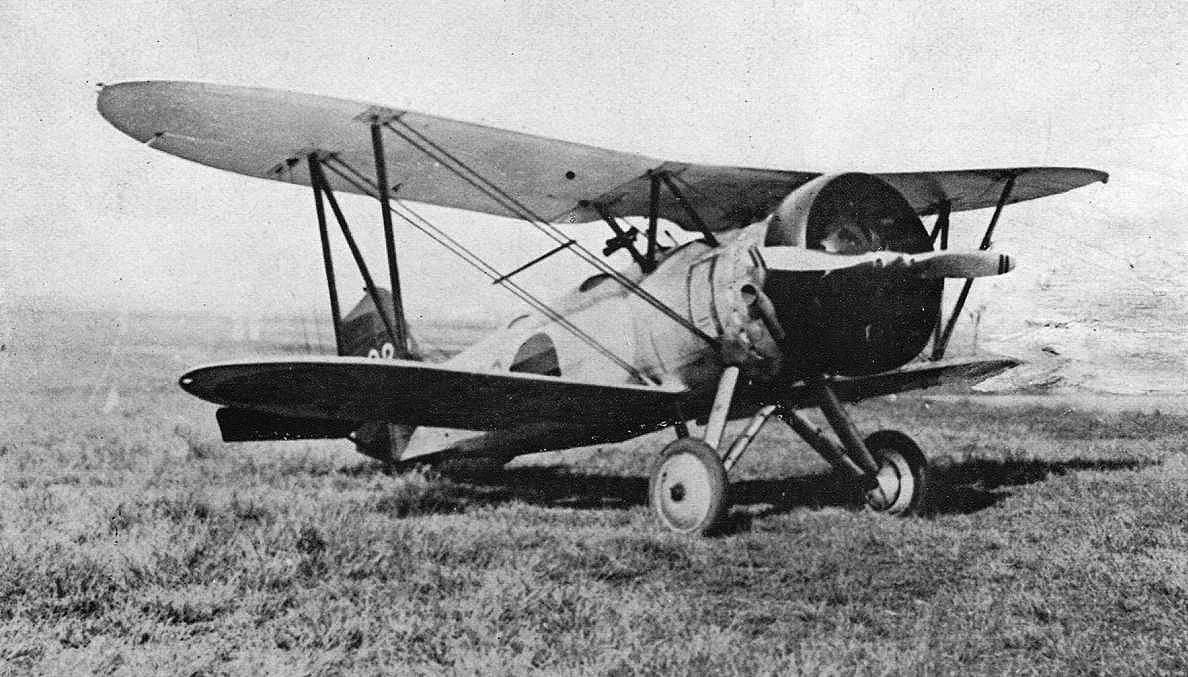
A2N3-1

A2N1
(Navy Type 90-I Carrier Fighter) - Guns located in both sides of the nose, but few produced.
A2N2
(Navy Type 90-II Carrier Fighter) - Guns transferred to the upper surface of the nose, the fuel tanks mounted on the fuselage sides.
A2N3
(Navy Type 90-III Carrier Fighter) - principal production variant. 5° of dihedral on upper mainplane.
A3N3-1
(Navy Type 90 Training Fighter) two-seat trainer

== Specifications (A2N1) ==
Data from Japanese Aircraft, 1910-1941, and The Complete Book of Fighters.

General characteristics

- Crew: 1
- Length: 6.183 m (20 ft 3 in)
- Wingspan: 9.37 m (30 ft 9 in)
- Height: 3.025 m (9 ft 11 in)
- Wing area: 19.74 m^{2} (212.5 sq ft)
- Empty weight: 1,045 kg (2,304 lb)
- Gross weight: 1,550 kg (3,417 lb)
- Powerplant: 1 × Nakajima Kotobuki 2 9-cylinder air-cooled radial piston engine 340–430 kW (460–580 hp)
- Propellers: 2-bladed Hamilton Standard fixed-pitch metal propeller

Performance

- Maximum speed: 293 km/h (182 mph, 158 kn)
- Cruise speed: 167 km/h (104 mph, 90 kn)
- Range: 500 km (310 mi, 270 nmi)
- Endurance: 3 hours
- Service ceiling: 9,000 m (30,000 ft)
- Time to altitude: 3,000 m (9,800 ft) in 5 minutes 45 seconds
- Wing loading: 78.5 kg/m^{2} (16.1 lb/sq ft)
- Power/mass: 0.222 kW/kg (0.135 hp/lb)

Armament

- Guns: 2 × 7.7 mm (0.303 in) machine guns

== See also ==
Related development

- Nakajima A4N

Aircraft of comparable role, configuration, and era

- Boeing F2B
- Boeing P-12
- Hawker Nimrod

Related lists

- List of aircraft of the Japanese Navy
- List of fighter aircraft

=== Bibliography ===
- Green, William; Swanborough, Gordon (1994). The Complete Book of Fighters. New York: Smithmark. ISBN 0-8317-3939-8.
- Mikesh, Robert C.; Abe, Shorzoe (1990). Japanese Aircraft, 1910-1941. London: Putnam Aeronautical Books. ISBN 0-85177-840-2.
- Passingham, Malcolm (November 1995). "Les premiers chasseurs embarqués Nakajima (2^{e} partie): Le A2N Type 90" [The First Nakajima Carrier Fighters, Part 2: The A2N Type 90]. Avions: Toute l'aéronautique et son histoire (in French) (32): 10–15. ISSN 1243-8650.
