= Nangō Mochifumi =

Mochifumi Nangō
- 南郷 茂章
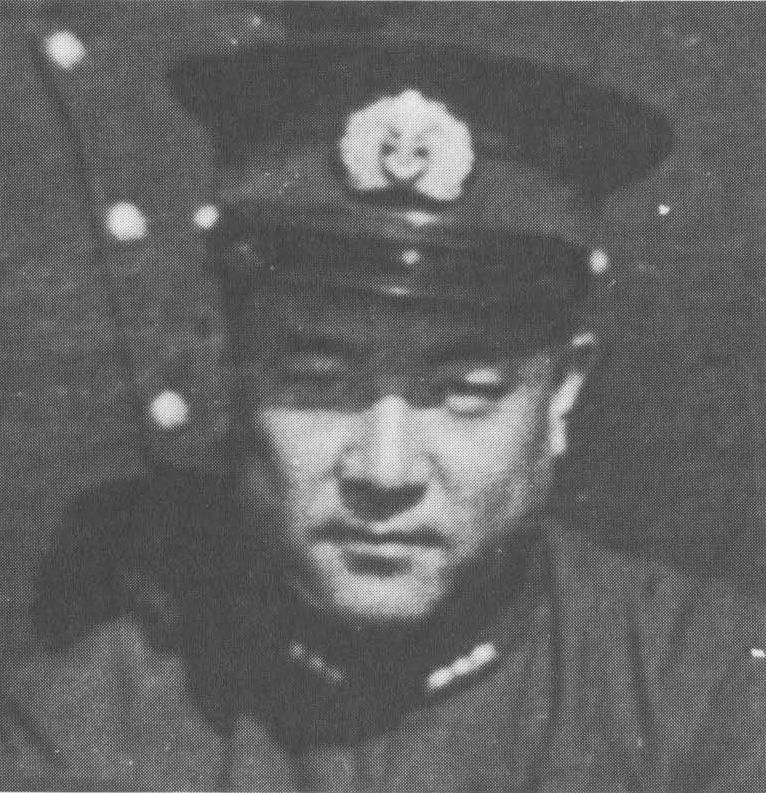
- Nangō in 1938 while serving on the aircraft carrier Sōryū
- Born: 1 July 1906; Hiroshima Prefecture, Japan
- Died: 18 July 1938 (aged 32); Poyang Lake, China
- Military career
- Allegiance: Japan
- Rank: Lieutenant
- Conflicts: Second Sino-Japanese War

Nangō Mochifumi (南郷 茂章, Mochifumi Nangō; 1 July 1906 – 18 July 1938) was an officer and ace fighter pilot in the Imperial Japanese Navy (IJN) during the Second Sino-Japanese War. In action in the war, Nangō was officially credited with destroying eight enemy aircraft.

Nangō graduated from the Naval Academy Etajima in 1927 and completed flight training in November 1932. After a tour of duty with the aircraft carrier Akagi's fighter group, he spent two years in London as the assistant naval attaché in the Japanese embassy.

After returning to Japan, Nangō was posted to the 13th Air Group in October 1937 soon after the outbreak of renewed hostilities with China. In a single engagement over Nanking on 2 December 1937, he was credited with destroying two Chinese aircraft. Later that month, Nangō was assigned as a division commander in the carrier Sōryū's fighter group.

In July 1938, Nangō assumed command of the 15th Air Group, based in Anqing. He led his fighter group in air operations supporting ground forces around Hankow and protecting shipping in the Yangtze River. Unsanitary conditions at Anqing contributed to ill health in many of the 15th's pilots, including Nangō, but he refused to be taken off flying duty. On 18 July 1938, he was killed during an aerial battle when his aircraft collided with a Chinese Polikarpov I-15 fighter flown by Soviet volunteer Valentin Dudonov. Nangō's death in battle was widely publicized in Japan and his funeral was attended by the vice minister of the navy, Isoroku Yamamoto.
