= Mitsugu Mori =

Japanese flying ace

- 森 貢
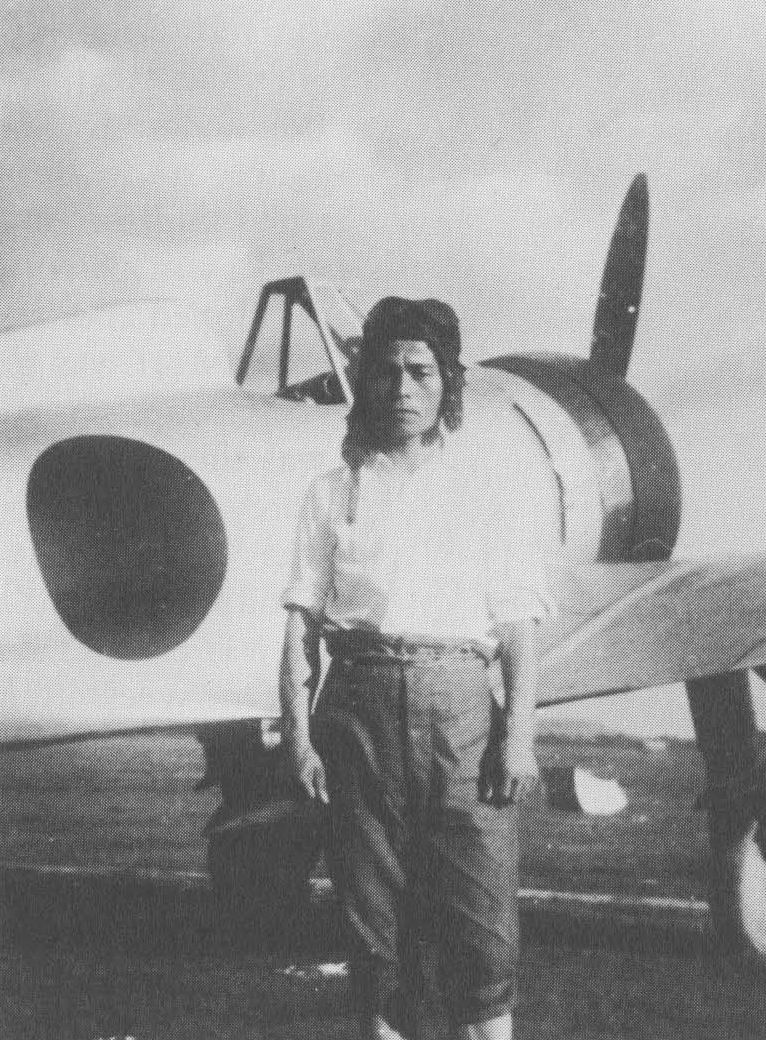
- Mori poses in front of a Mitsubishi A5M fighter while serving with the 12th Air Group in China in 1938 or 1939
- Born: May 5, 1908; Shizuoka Prefecture, Japan
- Died: 1960 (aged 51–52); Shizuoka Prefecture
- Military career
- Allegiance: Empire of Japan
- Branch: Imperial Japanese Navy Air Service (IJN)
- Service years: 1927–1944
- Rank: Lieutenant Junior Grade
- Conflicts: January 28 Incident; Second Sino-Japanese War; World War II; Solomon Islands Campaign; New Guinea Campaign

Mitsugu Mori (森 貢, Mori Mitsugu; May 5, 1908 – 1960) was an officer and ace fighter pilot in the Imperial Japanese Navy (IJN) during the January 28 Incident, the Second Sino-Japanese War, and the Pacific theater of World War II. As a member of the 12th Air Group during the Second Sino-Japanese War, Mori was officially credited with destroying four Chinese aircraft in aerial combat.

In May 1939, Mori was relegated to reserve status. He was recalled to active duty in July 1942 and participated as a fighter pilot in the Solomon Islands and New Guinea campaigns from air bases at Rabaul and Buin. Between October 1942 and May 1943, Mori was credited with shooting down five enemy aircraft. In May 1943, Mori returned to Japan and served as a test pilot with the IJN's Naval Air Technology Arsenal until his retirement in August 1944. Mori died of illness in 1960.
