= Kiyonobu Suzuki (pilot) =

- 鈴木 清延
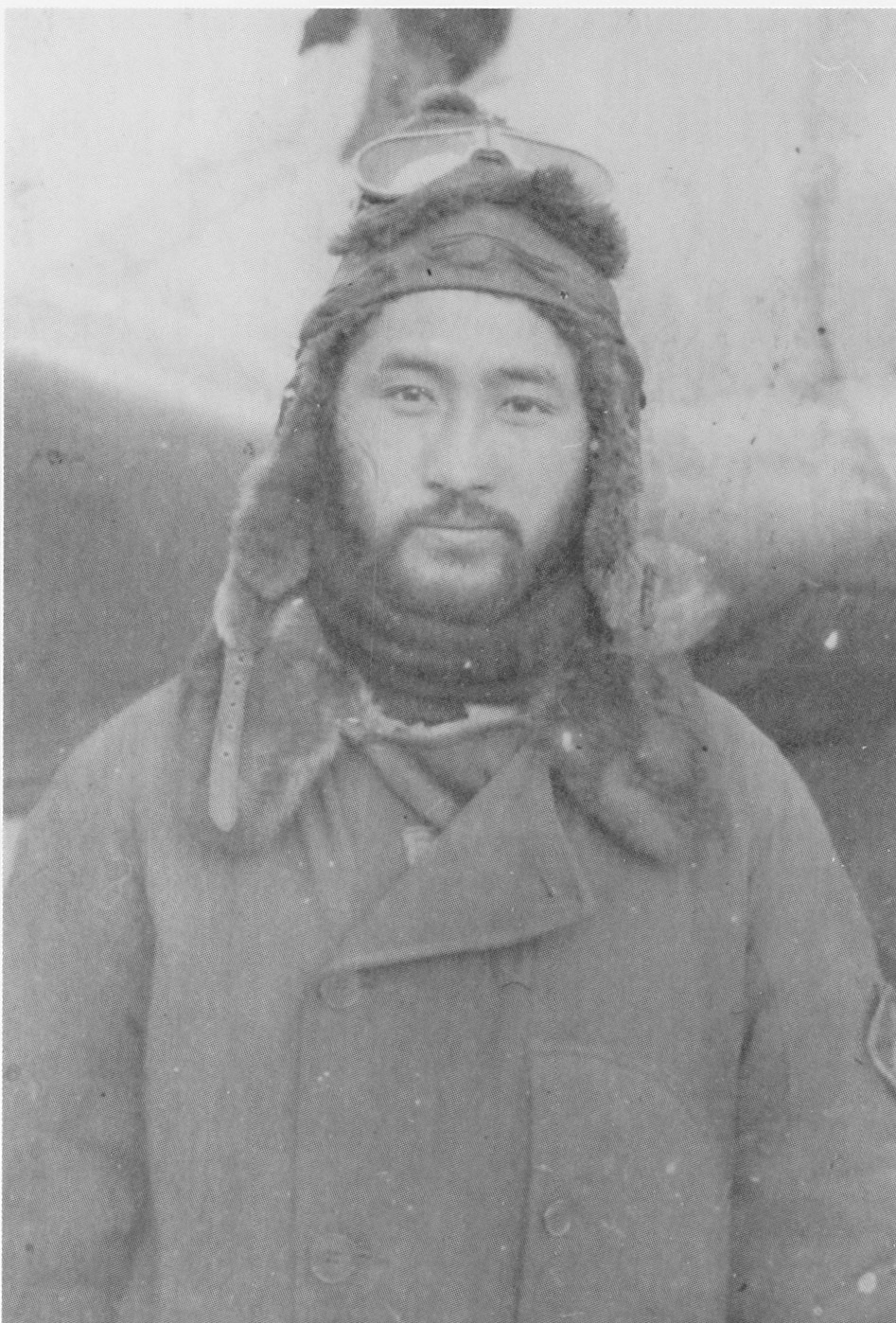
- Suzuki while serving with the 12th Air Group in China between March and September 1938
- Born: 1914; Fukuoka Prefecture, Japan
- Died: 26 October 1942 (aged 27–28); South Pacific
- Military career
- Allegiance: Empire of Japan
- Branch: Imperial Japanese Navy Air Service (IJN)
- Service years: 1933–1942
- Rank: Warrant Officer
- Conflicts: Second Sino-Japanese War; World War II; Pacific War

Kiyonobu Suzuki (鈴木 清延, Suzuki Kiyonobu; 1914 – 26 October 1942) was a warrant officer and ace fighter pilot in the Imperial Japanese Navy (IJN) during the Second Sino-Japanese War and the Pacific theater of World War II. In aerial combat over China and the Pacific he was officially credited with destroying nine enemy aircraft. As a member of the aircraft carrier Jun'yō's fighter group, Suzuki was killed in action on 26 October 1942 during the Battle of the Santa Cruz Islands.
