= Jirō Chōno =

- 蝶野 仁郎
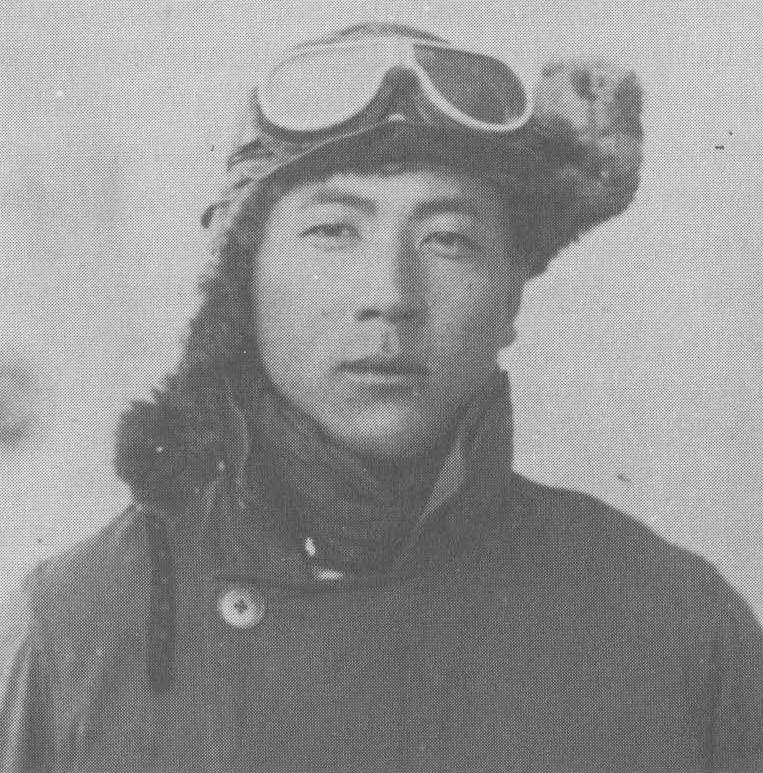
- Born: 1907; Ehime Prefecture, Japan
- Died: 21 February 1941 (aged 33–34); Kunming
- Military career
- Allegiance: Empire of Japan
- Branch: Imperial Japanese Navy
- Service years: 1927–1941
- Rank: Ensign
- Conflicts: Second Sino-Japanese War

Jirō Chōno (蝶野 仁郎; 1907 – 21 February 1941) was an officer and ace fighter pilot in the Imperial Japanese Navy (IJN) during the Second Sino-Japanese War. In combat over China, he was officially credited with destroying seven enemy aircraft. Chōno died in action on 21 February 1941 over Kunming.

While serving aboard the fleet aircraft carrier Kaga on 13 April 1938, then-PO1c Chōno was part of a six-fighter escort group of three A4N and three A5M fighters led by Lt. Teshima to cover eighteen D1A1 dive-bombers led by Lt. Nishihara on a strike mission against Canton; Lt. Teshima's A5M was malfunctioning, and PO1c Chōno in his A5M had taken over command of the fighter group, when they later were engaged by nine Gladiators of the Chinese Air Force 5th PS, 29th Squadron led by Capt. John "Buffalo" Wong and nine Gladiators led by Capt. Louie Yim-qun of the 28th Squadron. In the ensuing running air battle and dogfights over Canton city, the Chinese Gladiator pilots claimed at least one A5M, two or three A4Ns and two or three D1A1s; Capt. Wong of the 29th scored a triple-kill, successively shooting down a D1A1, an A4N and an A5M, before being shot down himself by Jirō Chōno; although Capt. Wong survived, his injuries will put him out of action for an extended period of time. Both PO1c Chōno and PO3c Hatsu-o Hidaka (flying an A4N) would each score double-victories against the formidable Gladiators in this major air-battle over Canton.
