= Akio Matsuba =

- 松場 秋夫
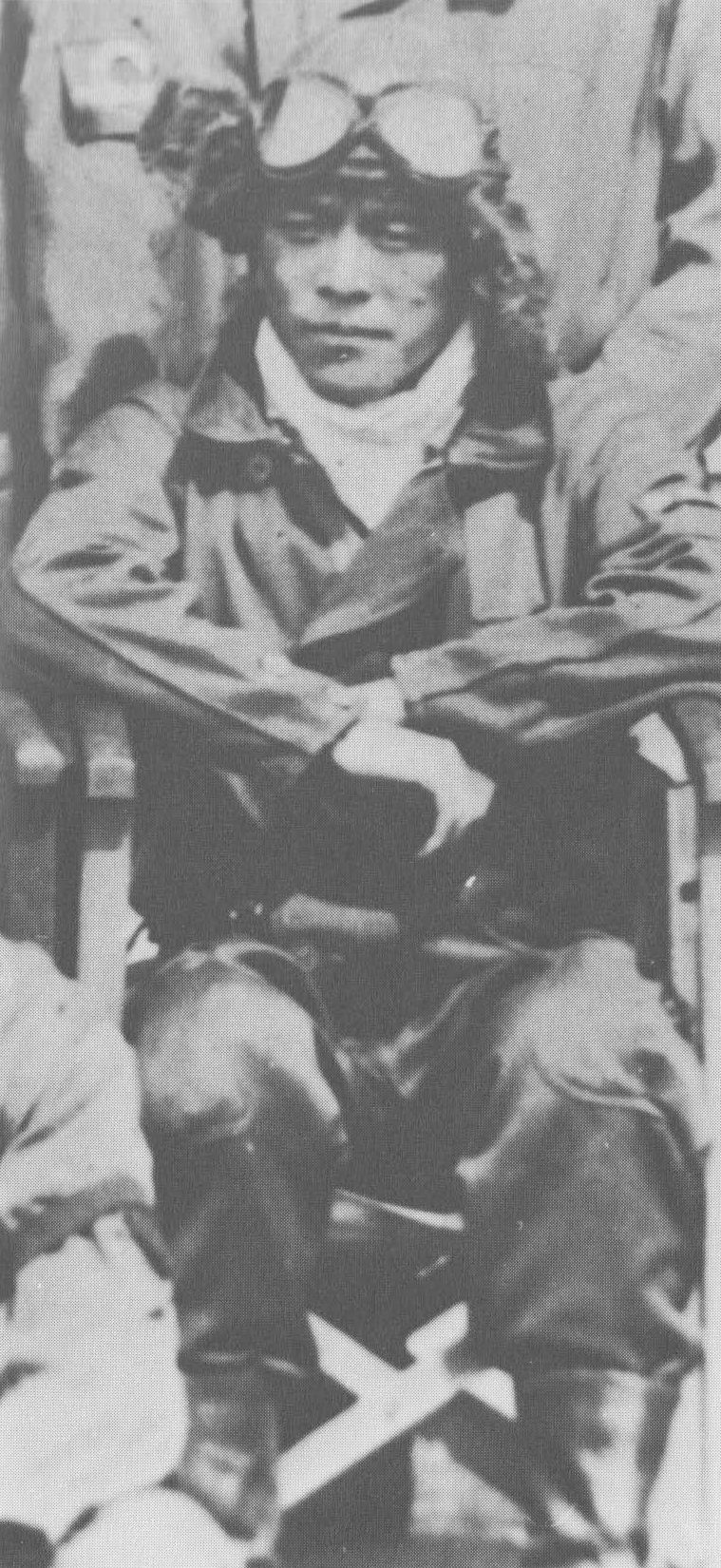
- Matsuba in 1943 while flying with the Atsugi Air Group
- Born: 1914; Mie, Japan
- Military career
- Allegiance: Empire of Japan
- Branch: Imperial Japanese Navy Air Service (IJN)
- Service years: 1935 – ?
- Rank: Lieutenant Junior Grade
- Conflicts: Second Sino-Japanese War; World War II; Pacific War

Akio Matsuba (松場 秋夫, Matsuba Akio) was an officer and ace fighter pilot in the Imperial Japanese Navy (IJN) during the Second Sino-Japanese War and the Pacific theater of World War II. Matsuba was officially credited with destroying a total of 18 enemy aircraft in aerial combat.

Akio Matsuba was stationed aboard the fleet aircraft carrier Kaga on the very first day of combat operations in the Second Sino-Japanese War-Second World War at the Battle of Shanghai, and flying an A2N in his very first combat mission in support of Japanese troop-landings in Shanghai on 16 August 1937, Matsuba would share in the shooting down of a Chinese Air Force Douglas O-2M, the first kill of many kills to come for him as the war eventually expanded into the Pacific War. He would claim six F6F Hellcats from Task Force 58 shot-down in two days of battles fought over Iwo Jima on 03 and 4 July 1944, half-a-year before the official Battle of Iwo Jima.
