= Imperial Japanese Navy Air Service =

Air arm of the Imperial Japanese Navy from 1912 to 1945

- 大日本帝國海軍航空隊; Dai-Nippon Teikoku Kaigun Koku Tai
- Rising Sun Flag
- Active: 1912–1945
- Country: Empire of Japan
- Branch: Imperial Japanese Navy
- Type: Naval aviation
- Engagements: World War I Second Sino-Japanese War; World War II

Commanders
- Ceremonial chief: Emperor of Japan
- Notable commanders: Chuichi Nagumo; Minoru Genda; Mitsuo Fuchida

Insignia
- Roundel

The Imperial Japanese Navy Air Service (大日本帝國海軍航空隊, Dai-Nippon Teikoku Kaigun Kōkū-tai) (IJNAS) was the air arm of the Imperial Japanese Navy (IJN). The organization was responsible for the operation of naval aircraft and the conduct of aerial warfare in the Pacific War.

The Japanese military acquired its first aircraft in 1910 and followed the development of air combat during World War I with great interest. Japan initially built European aircraft under license, but by the early 1930s Japanese factories were producing domestic designs. The Japanese also embarked on an ambitious aircraft carrier building program, launching the world's first purpose-built aircraft carrier, Hōshō, in 1922. Several excess battlecruisers and battleships were converted into aircraft carriers as well. As the organization assigned to the IJN's aircraft carriers, the Navy Air Service was tasked with the missions of national air defence, deep strike, naval warfare, and so forth. It retained this mission until its dissolution at the end of the Second World War.

The Japanese pilot training program was extremely selective and rigorous, producing a high-quality and long-serving pilot corps, who were very successful in aerial combat during the early part of World War II in the Pacific. However, as combat casualties mounted starting in 1942, the long duration of the pilot training program, combined with a shortage of gasoline for training, prevented the IJNAS from rapidly providing qualified replacement pilots in sufficient numbers. Moreover, Japan, unlike the U.S. or Britain, never altered its program to speed up the training process of its recruits.

From 1944 onwards, the American naval blockade of Japan began to result in an acute shortage of critical materials required for aircraft production in factories on the Home Islands. This directly affected both the number, quality and type of aircraft available to the IJNAS from mid-1944 onwards. By the end of 1944, many aircraft utilized by the IJNAS were being sent to the front without undergoing any serious testing.

The decrease in both quality and quantity of trained pilots and available aircraft contributed significantly to increasing losses of aircraft and aircrew for the IJNAS toward the end of the war.

Japanese naval aviators, like their army counterparts, preferred maneuverable aircraft, utilizing lightly built but extraordinarily agile planes, most famously the A6M Zero, which achieved its maneuverability by sacrificing armor and self-sealing fuel tanks. Aircraft with armor and self-sealing fuel tanks, such as the Kawanishi N1K-J, would not enter service until late 1944–1945, too late to have a meaningful impact on the outcome of the war.

== Early history ==
=== Origins ===
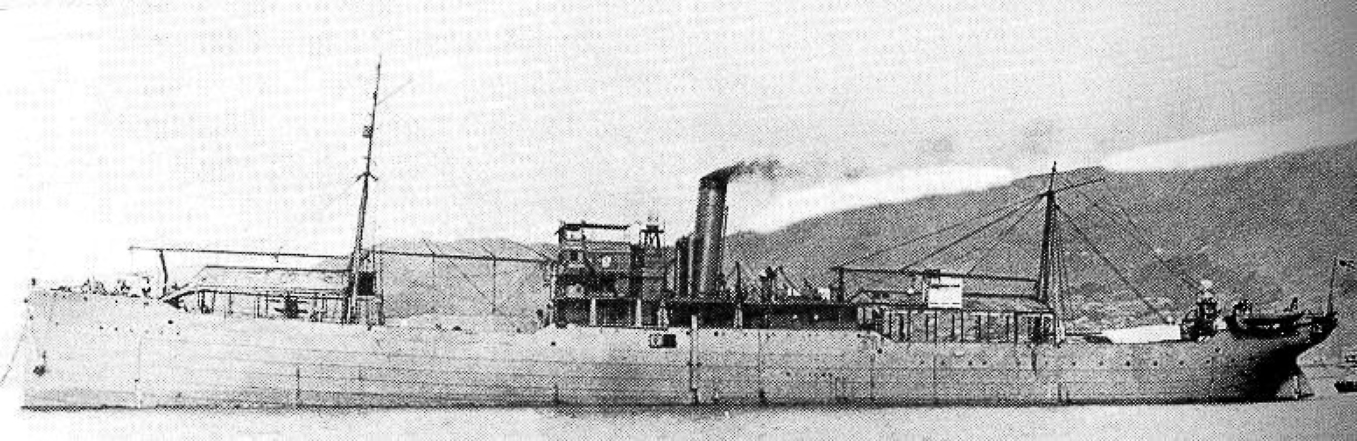
Seaplane carrier Wakamiya

The origins of Japanese naval aviation can be traced to 1912, with the creation of the Commission on Naval Aeronautical Research (Kaigun Kokūjutsu Kenkyūkai) under the authority of the Technical Department. The commission was charged with the promotion of aviation technology and training for the IJN. Initially, the commission focused on non-rigid airships, but swiftly moved on to the development of winged and powered aircraft. That same year, the commission decided to purchase foreign winged aircraft and to send junior officers abroad to learn how to fly and maintain them. The navy purchased two seaplanes from the Glenn Curtiss factory in Hammondsport, New York, and two Maurice Farman seaplanes from France. To establish a cadre of naval aviators and technicians, the IJN also dispatched three officers to Hammondsport and two to France for training and instruction. After their return to Japan at the end of 1912, two of the newly trained naval aviators made the first flights at Oppama on Yokosuka Bay, one in a Curtiss seaplane, the other in a Maurice Farman.

In 1912, the Royal Navy had also informally established its own flying branch, the Royal Naval Air Service. Several Japanese admirals, whose own Navy had been modeled on the Royal Navy, proposed the creation of their own naval air arm. Japanese naval strategists had also observed technical developments in other countries, and foresaw the potential battlefield impact of a strong naval air service. Within a year, the IJN had begun the operational use of aircraft. In 1913, the following year, a Navy transport ship, Wakamiya Maru, was converted into a seaplane carrier capable of carrying two assembled and two disassembled seaplanes. Wakamiya also participated in the naval maneuvers off Sasebo that year.

=== Siege of Tsingtao ===
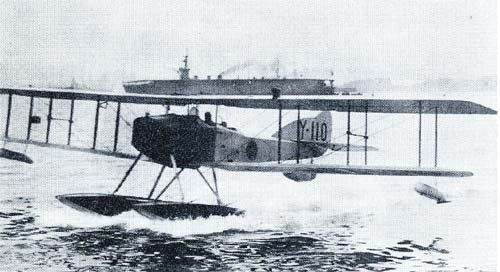
Yokosuka Ro-go Ko-gata, the first domestic designed and built seaplane

On 23 August 1914, as a result of its treaty with Great Britain, Japan declared war on Germany. The Japanese, together with a token British force, blockaded and subsequently laid siege to the German colony of Jiaozhou and its administrative capital Qingdao on the Shandong peninsula. During the siege, starting from September, four Farman seaplanes (two active and two reserve) on board Wakamiya conducted reconnaissance and aerial bombardments of German positions and ships. The aircraft possessed crude bombsights and carried six to ten bombs that had been converted from artillery shells, released through metal tubes on each side of the cockpit. On 5 September, during the first successful operation, two Farman seaplanes dropped several bombs on the Bismarck battery, the main German artillery position in Tsingtao. The bombs landed harmlessly in the mud, but the aircraft were able to confirm that the light cruiser SMS Emden was not at Tsingtao; this intelligence was of significant importance to Allied naval command. On 30 September, Wakamiya was damaged by a mine and later sent back to Japan for repairs. However, the seaplanes were transferred to the shore and continued to operate against the German defenders until their surrender on 7 November 1914. Wakamiya conducted the world's first naval-launched aerial raids in history (Note: Wakamiya is "credited with conducting the first successful carrier air raid in history") and was, in effect, the first aircraft carrier of the Imperial Japanese Navy. (Note: "Nevertheless, the Wakamiya has the distinction of being the first aircraft carrier of the Imperial Navy".) By the end of the siege Japanese aircraft had conducted 50 sorties and dropped 200 bombs, although damage to German defenses was negligible.

=== Further developments (1916–1918) ===
In 1916, the Commission on Naval Aeronautical Research was disbanded and the funds supporting it were reallocated for the establishment of three naval air units (hikotai) which would fall under the authority of the Naval Affairs Bureau within the Navy Ministry. The first unit was established at Yokosuka in April 1916. However, a lack of focused naval air policy in these early years was made apparent by the fact that the Yokosuka Air Group operated with the fleet only once a year, when it was transported briefly to whatever training area the IJN surface fleet was using for maneuvers. Despite this, Japanese naval aviation continued to make progress. In 1917, officers at the Yokosuka Naval Arsenal designed and built the first Japanese seaplane, the Ro-Go Ko-gata reconnaissance seaplane, which was more useful at sea and much safer than the Maurice Farman aircraft that the IJN had previously employed. This aircraft was eventually mass-produced, becoming the mainstay of the navy's air arm until the mid-1920s. By the end of the war, Japanese factories were beginning to turn out engines and fuselages based on foreign designs in increasing numbers. A major enlargement of Japanese naval air strength was part of the 1918 naval expansion program, which established a new air group and a naval air station at Sasebo. In 1918, the IJN secured land around Lake Kasumigaura in Ibaraki Prefecture, northeast of Tokyo. The following year, a naval air station for both land and sea-based aircraft was established, and subsequently, naval air training was transferred to Kasumigaura, from Yokosuka. After the establishment of a naval air training unit at Kasumigaura, the air station became the principal flight training center for the navy.

== Interwar development ==
=== Sempill mission ===
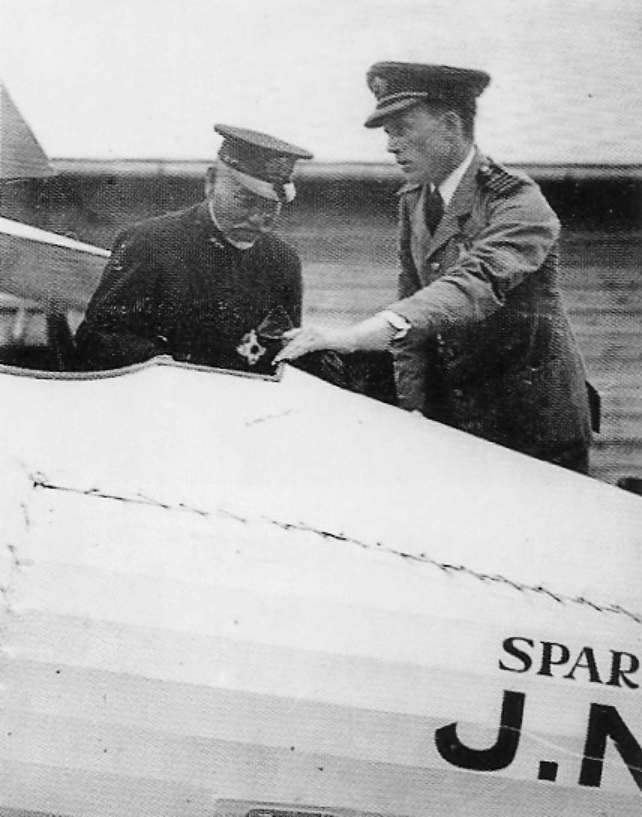
Captain Sempill showing a Sparrowhawk to Admiral Tōgō Heihachirō, 1921

The Japanese navy had closely monitored the progress and utilization of airpower within the three Allied naval powers during World War I, and concluded that Britain had made the greatest advances in naval aviation. Japanese strategists had also learned a significant amount about naval aviation through wartime contacts within the Royal Navy. In 1920, a Japanese representative had also been sent to Britain to observe air operations off the decks of the British carrier Furious. In 1921, the Japanese government formally requested that the British dispatch a naval air mission, in order to develop and to provide a professional assistance to Japanese naval aviation. Despite reservations on the part of the Admiralty about granting the Japanese unrestricted access to British technology, the British government sent an unofficial civil aviation mission to Japan.

The Sempill Mission was led by Captain William Forbes-Sempill, a former officer in the Royal Air Force experienced in the design and testing of Royal Navy aircraft during the First World War. The mission consisted of 27 members, who were largely personnel with experience in naval aviation and included pilots and engineers from several British aircraft manufacturing firms. The British technical mission left for Japan in September with the objective of helping the Imperial Japanese Navy develop and improve the proficiency of its naval air arm. The British government also hoped it would lead to a lucrative arms deal with Japan. The mission arrived at Kasumigaura Naval Air Station the following month, in November 1921, and stayed in Japan for 18 months.

The Japanese were trained on several British aircraft such as the Gloster Sparrowhawk, as the mission also brought to Kasumigaura over a hundred aircraft comprising twenty different models, five of which were then currently in service with the Royal Air Force, including the Sparrowhawk. These planes eventually provided the inspiration for the design of a number of Japanese naval aircraft. Technicians became familiar with the newest aerial weapons and equipment - torpedoes, bombs, machine guns, cameras, and communications gear. Naval aviators were trained in various techniques such as torpedo bombing, flight control and carrier landing and take-offs; skills that would later be employed in the shallow waters of Pearl Harbor in December 1941. The mission also brought schematics of the most recent British aircraft carriers, such as HMS Argus and HMS Hermes, which influenced the final stages of the development of the Japanese carrier Hōshō. By the time the last members of the mission had returned to Britain, the Japanese had acquired a reasonable grasp of the latest aviation technology and the Sempill mission of 1921–22 marked the true beginning of an effective Japanese naval air force. Throughout the 1920s, Japanese naval aviation continued to be dependent on the British model in both technology and doctrine.

The Japanese military was also aided in the buildup of their naval air force by Sempill himself, who had become a Japanese spy. Over the next 20 years, the British Peer provided the Japanese with secret information on the latest British aviation technology. His espionage work helped Japan rapidly develop its military aircraft and accompanying technologies before the Second World War.

=== Carrier aviation ===
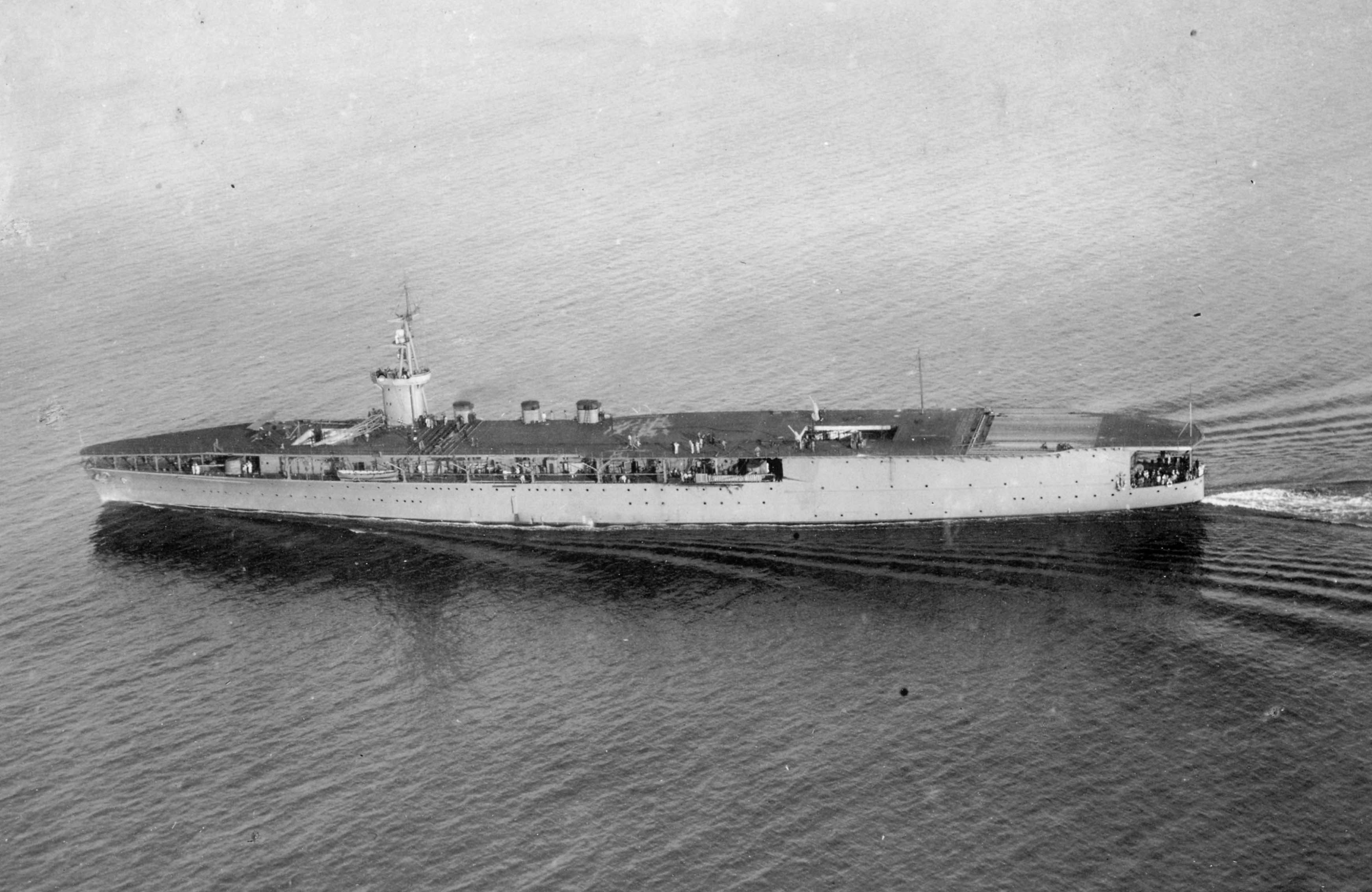
The aircraft carrier Hōshō in 1922

Japanese interest in the potential of carrier operations demonstrated by the observations on board Furious led to the inclusion of an aircraft carrier in the eight-eight fleet program of 1918. The 7,470-ton Hōshō was laid down in December 1919 at Yokohama. Hōshō was the second warship after the British Hermes to be designed from the keel up as an aircraft carrier, and the first ship to be completed as such from the keel up.

In the 1920s, most of the aircraft acquired by the Japanese were land-based seaplanes, whose main tasks were reconnaissance and anti-submarine patrols. Japanese planners had initially proposed the formation of 17 squadrons of these aircraft, but budgetary constraints limited these units to eleven until 1931. Under the terms of the Washington Naval Treaty, Japan was allowed to rebuild two incomplete capital ships as carriers: Akagi and Amagi. However, Amagi was damaged during the Great Kanto earthquake in 1923, and was replaced by Kaga. Akagi was completed in 1927, while Kaga was completed a year later. With these two carriers, much of Imperial Japanese Navy's doctrines and operating procedures were established.

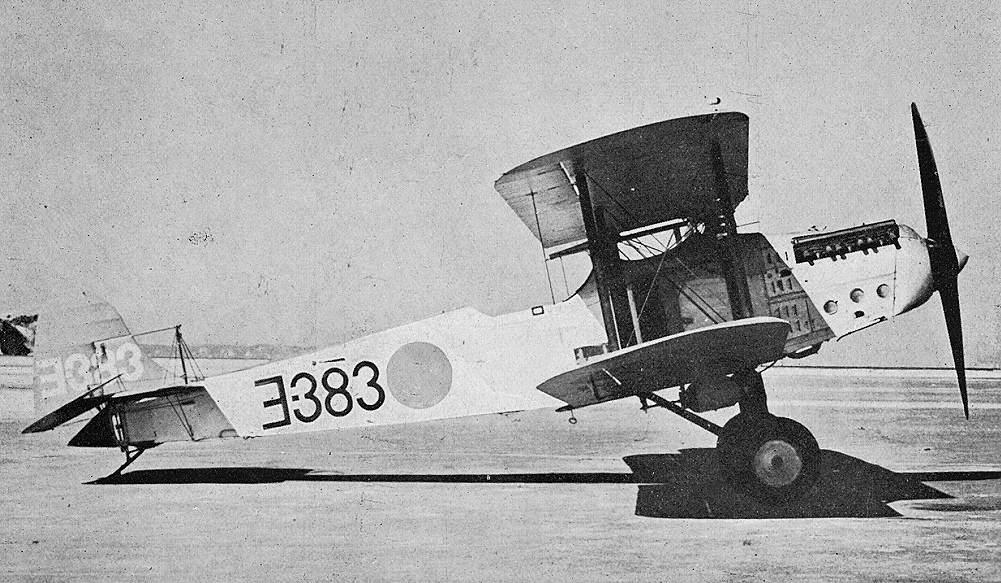
Mitsubishi B1M torpedo bomber

When Hōshō was completed, little thought was given to naval aircraft in an offensive role; moreover, with only one carrier in the fleet there was insufficient consideration given to naval air doctrine within the Japanese naval establishment. However, in 1928 the First Carrier Division was formed with three carriers, and the study of the role of aircraft carriers in a naval engagement was initiated. Because of the short range of carrier aircraft at the time, many in the Japanese naval hierarchy were still very much surface oriented. These proponents of surface warfare believed carrier aircraft should be employed in a supporting role for the main battle fleet, not as offensive weapons. Naval aircraft were tasked with scouting, laying smoke screens for naval gunfire, conducting fleet air defense, and later (with the increase in aircraft performance) with attacking battleships and other surface targets.

Japanese naval aviators had a different perspective. Believing that a major aerial engagement to clear the space over the opposing fleets would precede any decisive surface battle, they increasingly considered enemy aircraft carriers as the primary targets of naval air power. As a result of these two divergent viewpoints within the IJN's officer corps, by the early 1930s, the Imperial Japanese Navy adhered to no unified doctrine as to how carriers would be utilized in a fleet action, and had no clear vision regarding the role of air power in naval warfare. Eventually, as the range and combat capability of naval aircraft continued to grow, carriers became acknowledged for their ability to strike at targets beyond the range of surface guns and torpedoes. The IJN became increasingly convinced that carrier aircraft should be used for a preemptive strike against the enemy's carriers to achieve air superiority in the proximity of any major surface engagement. Around 1932–33, the IJN began to shift its aerial focus from attacking enemy battleships to targeting hostile aircraft carriers. By the mid-30s, with the improved performance of bombing aircraft and particularly dive-bombers, the destruction of hostile carrier forces became the primary focus of Japan's naval air arm. The emerging concept of massed aerial attack also shifted the emphasis of the IJNAS away from the protection of the main battle fleet, and onto attacking targets over the horizon. Essential to the implementation of such a tactic was locating hostile ships before the enemy found the Japanese carriers in turn. Consequently, it became critical to Japanese planners that their naval aircraft were able to "outrange the enemy" in the air, just as Japanese surface forces could do via superior naval gunnery and torpedo attacks. Subsequently, throughout the 1930s, Japanese naval aviation emphasized range in its specifications for new aircraft.

=== Land-based air groups ===
In addition to developing carrier-based aviation, the IJN maintained many land-based air groups. In the early 1930s, the Japanese created a new category of aircraft termed rikujo kogeki-ki (land-based attack aircraft) or Rikko for short. This was in line with the strategy of providing a rapid defense of the home islands against a possible American naval offensive westward across the Pacific. Land-based aircraft actually provided the bulk of Japanese naval aviation up to the eve of the Pacific War. In this regard, Japan was unique among the three major naval powers during the interwar period and the immediate prewar years, with only the two air wings of the US Marine Corps being analogous to Japan's land-based naval air units. The creation of these air units had begun at the end of World War I, when plans had been drawn up for 17 of them, however these plans were not fully implemented until 1931. They were to be located at six air stations around the Japanese home islands: Yokosuka, Sasebo, Kasumigaura, Omura, Tateyama, and Kure. These units were composed of various types of aircraft, most of which were seaplanes. In absolute numbers, land-based aircraft represented the largest growth in Japanese naval air power in the years before the Pacific War. The Circle One naval expansion program, formulated in 1927 and put into effect in 1931, called for the creation of 28 new air groups. Although only 14 groups were actually established by 1934, in response to American naval expansion under the first Vinson plan, the Circle Two program called for eight additional air groups to be created by the end of 1937. They were to operate out of six new air stations at Ōminato, Saeki, Yokohama, Maizuru, Kanoya, and Kisarazu in the home islands, and Chinhae on the southern coast of Korea. Under the pressure of the United States' second Vinson plan, the Japanese built up their land-based air forces with increased momentum. The deadline for the completion date for Circle One's aviation expansion was moved up to 1937, and an all-out effort was also made to complete the aircraft production of the Circle Two program by the end of the same year.

By the end of 1937, the IJN possessed 563 land-based aircraft, in addition to the 332 aircraft aboard its carrier fleet. The naval air service had a total of 895 aircraft and 2,711 aircrew, including pilots and navigators, organized into thirty-nine air groups. Although this air strength was considerably less than total American naval air strength in the same period, Japan's land-based aviation force was substantially larger. This substantial land-based air power worked to Japan's advantage when the nation went to war in 1937 with China.

== Expansion (1931–1937) ==
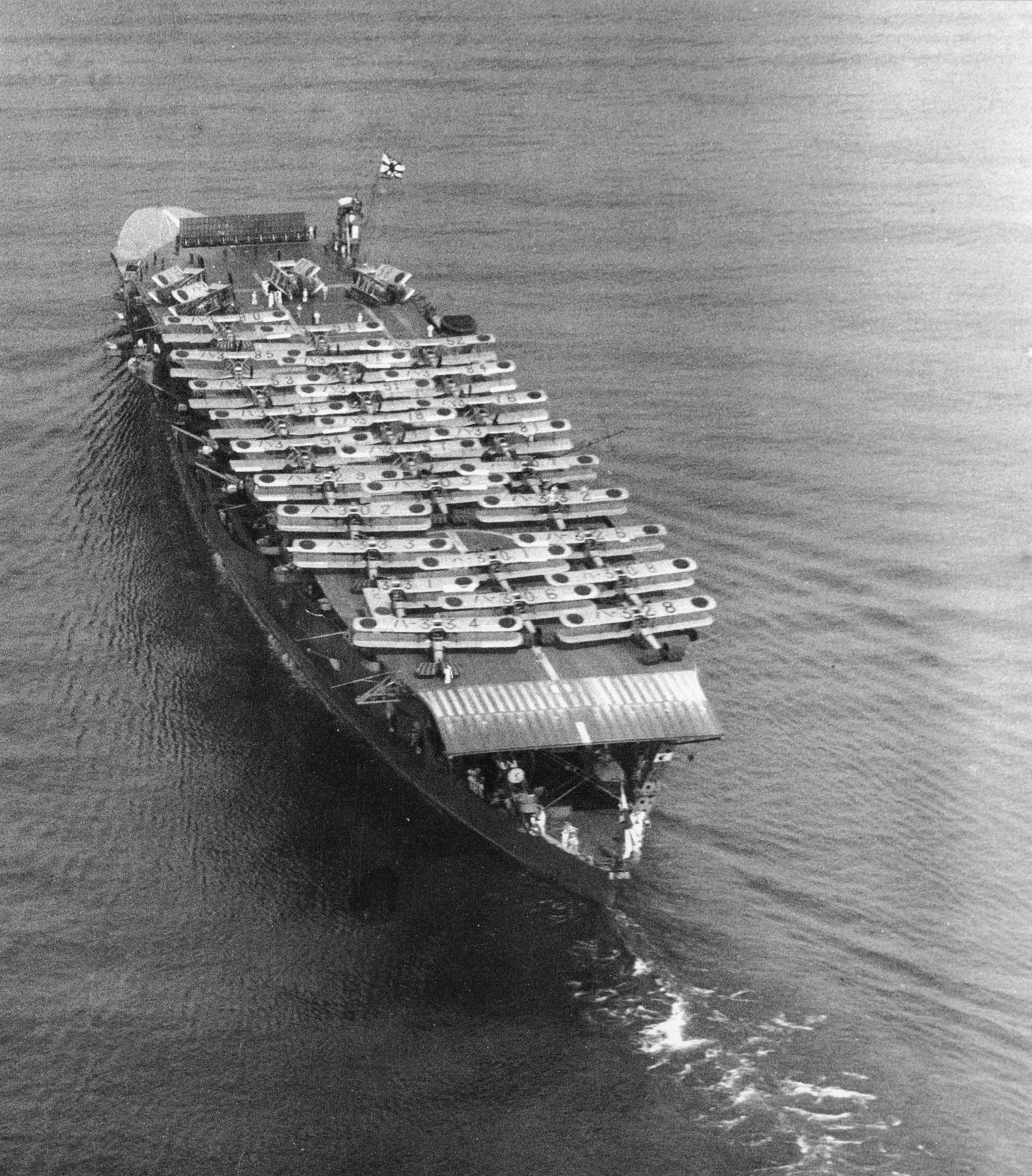
A stern view of Akagi off Osaka on 15 October 1934. On deck are Mitsubishi B1M and B2M bombers.

By 1927 Japanese naval aviation had grown sufficiently in size and complexity that it was necessary to consolidate the administrative organization of the air service. Various peacetime air operations and activities, which were divided between the Navy Ministry and the Navy Technical Department, were merged into a single Naval Aviation Department. In 1932, an independent Naval Air Arsenal was also established to streamline the testing and development of aircraft and weaponry. During their early years, these organizations were under the command of able air enthusiasts, who played a major role in the rapid expansion of Japanese naval aviation during the following decade. The London Naval Treaty of 1930 had imposed new limitations on warship construction, which caused the Navy General Staff to view naval aviation as a way to make up for the shortcomings in the surface fleet.

In 1931, the air service pushed for and established the remainder of the 17 air squadrons that had been projected in the 1923 expansion plans. These were eventually combined into six air groups (kokutai) located at six bases around Japan. Furthermore, the Circle naval expansion programs featured an additional 12 air groups. They also included the development of specific aviation technologies and the acceleration of aircrew training. The Circle One plan concentrated on developing new aircraft types, including large flying boats and land-based attack aircraft, as well as the construction of seaborne units, both floatplanes and carrier aircraft. The Circle Two plan continued the buildup in naval aircraft and authorized the construction of two additional aircraft carriers.

=== Shanghai incident (1932) ===
In January 1932, clashes between Chinese and Japanese forces occurred in Shanghai. On 29 January, several aircraft from the seaplane tender Notoro, anchored in the Yangtze river, carried out low-level attacks on Chinese military positions in Zhabei, striking artillery positions outside the city and an armored train at a railway station in the northern part of the city. There were heavy civilian casualties and destruction of property, partly as a result of the crude bombing techniques and mechanisms in use at the time. The Third Fleet, consisting of the First Carrier Division with the carriers Kaga and Hōshō, was also dispatched to the city. Kaga arrived at the mouth of the Yangtze River on 1 February, and was joined by Hōshō two days later. On board Hōshō were ten fighters and nine torpedo bombers, while Kaga had 16 fighters and 32 torpedo bombers. Altogether, the Japanese had eighty aircraft that could be deployed over Shanghai, mostly Nakajima A1N2 fighters and Mitsubishi B1M3 torpedo bombers. On 3 February, a number of the aircraft from the two carriers were deployed to Kunda Airfield, where they flew missions in support of Japanese ground forces.

Aircraft from Hōshō participated in the IJN's first aerial combat on 5 February, when three fighters escorting two bombers were engaged by nine Chinese fighters over Zhenru; one Chinese fighter was damaged. On 22 February, while escorting three B1M3 torpedo bombers, three fighters from Kaga operating from Kunda Airfield scored the IJN's first aerial victory when they shot down a Boeing 218 fighter, flown by an American volunteer pilot Robert Short. Acting on intelligence that the Chinese were planning to mount a counteroffensive, the Japanese bombers carried out attacks on Chinese airfields at Hangzhou and Suzhou between 23 and 26 February, destroying a number of aircraft on the ground. On 26 February, six A1N2 fighters from Hōshō, while escorting nine bombers from Kaga on a bombing raid targeting a Chinese airfield at Hangzhou, engaged five Chinese aircraft and shot down three of them. The Japanese carriers returned to home waters after a ceasefire was declared on 3 March. Aircrews of Kaga received a special commendation from the commander of the Third Fleet, Vice Admiral Kichisaburō Nomura, for their actions.

The actions of the Japanese aviators over Shanghai represented the first significant air operations over East Asia, and for the IJN it also marked the beginning of carrier-based combat operations. The attack on Zhabei was also the most destructive aerial attack on an urban area until the Condor Legion's attack on Guernica, five years later. Although perceived as insignificant skirmishes, the aerial campaign led Japanese strategists to several conclusions: although the A1N2 fighter proved to be inferior in performance to the Boeing 218, the campaign had demonstrated the above average flying skills of the IJN's pilots and the relative precision of its bombing techniques during clear weather.

== China War (1937–1941) ==
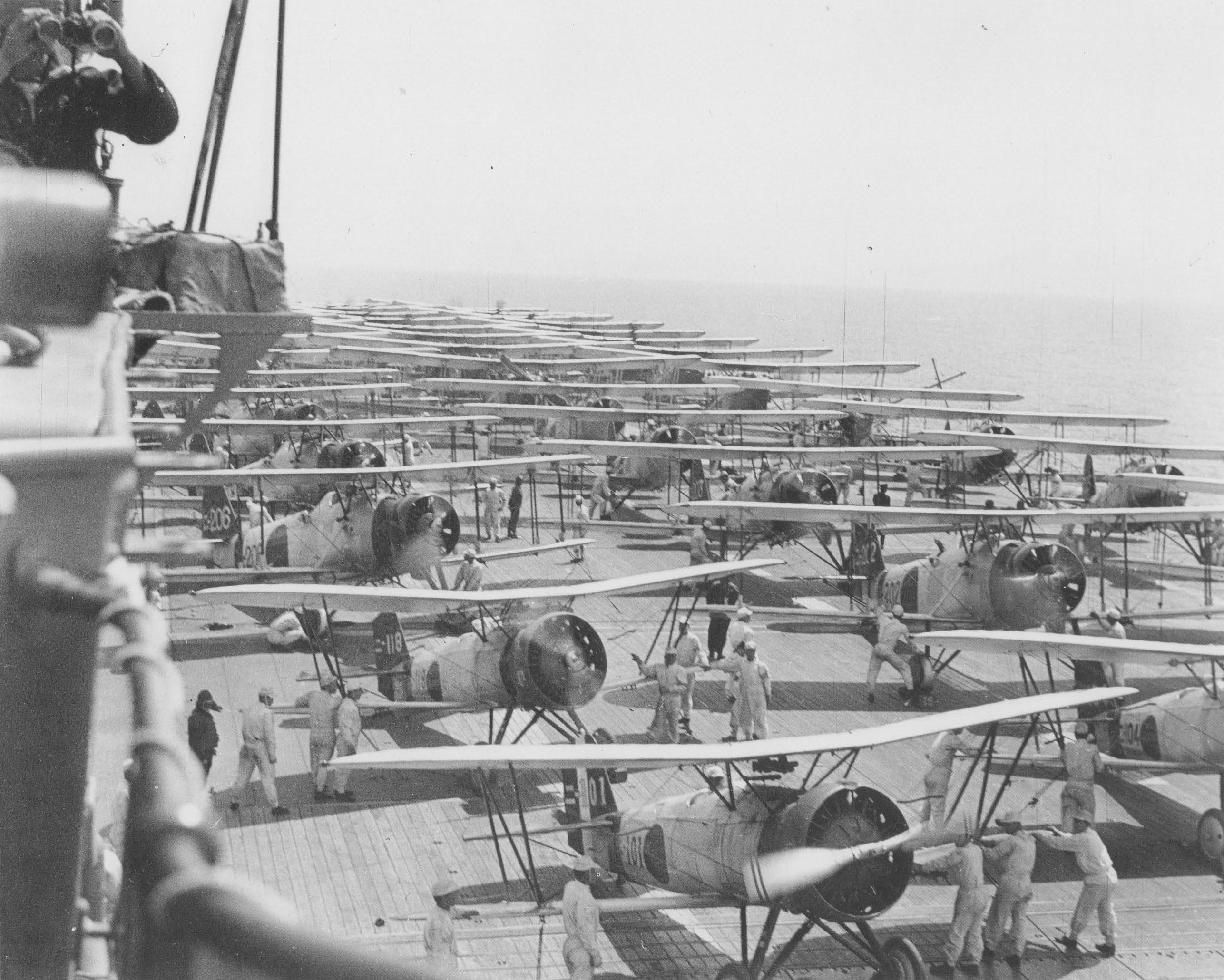
Kaga conducts air operations in 1937. On deck are Nakajima A2N, Aichi D1A, and Mitsubishi B2M aircraft.

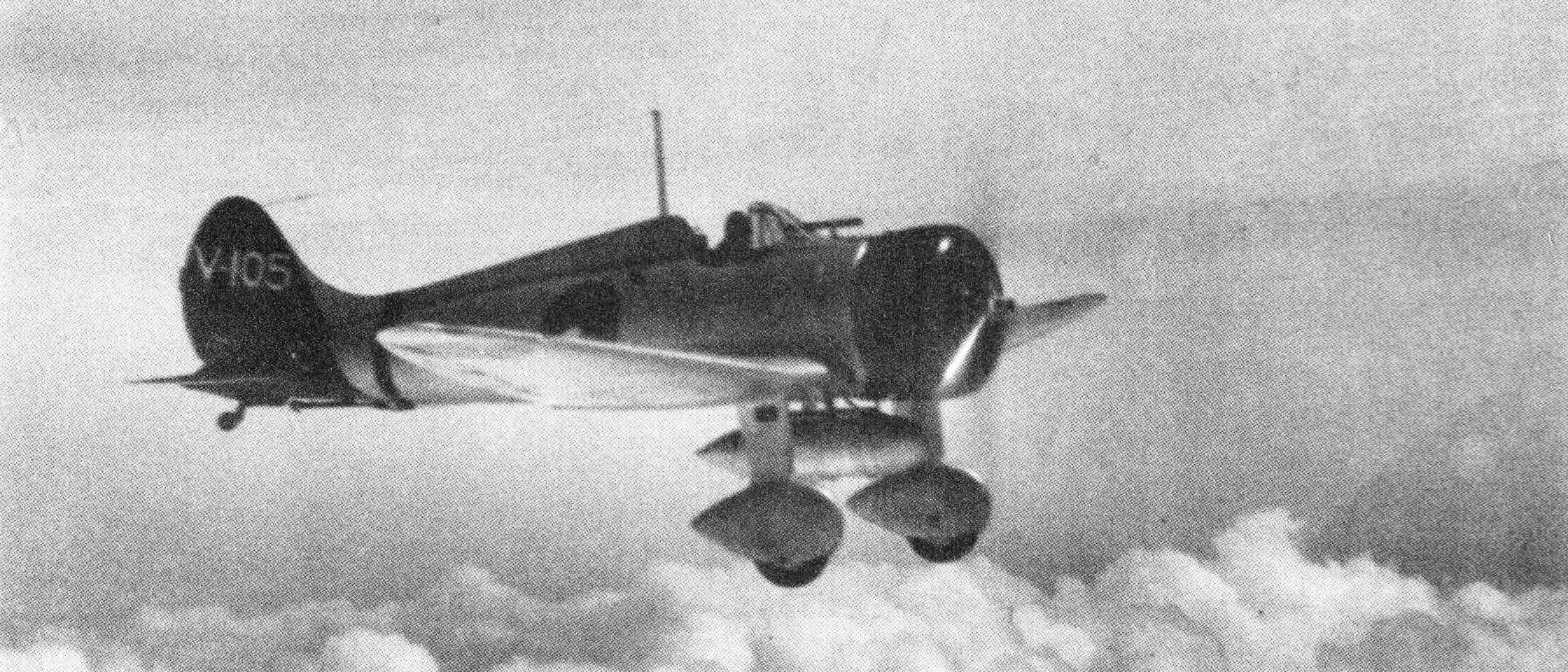
A Mitsubishi A5M from Akagi or Kaga in flight with an external fuel tank (1938 or 1939)

From the onset of hostilities in 1937 until forces were diverted to fight in the western Pacific in 1941, naval aircraft played a key role in Japanese military operations on the Chinese mainland. The IJN had two primary responsibilities: first, to support amphibious operations on the Chinese coast, and second, to carry out strategic aerial bombardment of Chinese cities. This was unique in naval history, as it was the first time that any naval air service had ever carried out such an effort. The campaign initially began in 1937, taking place largely in the Yangtze River basin with attacks on Chinese Nationalist military installations along the coast by Japanese carrier aircraft. Naval involvement reached its peak in 1938–39 with the ferocious bombardment of cities deep in the Chinese interior by land-based medium bombers, and concluded during 1941 with an attempt by tactical aircraft, both carrier and land-based, to cut communication and transportation routes in southern China. Although the 1937–41 air offensives failed in their political and psychological aims, they reduced the flow of strategic materiel to China, improving the Japan's military situation in the central and southern parts of the country for a time. The China War was of great importance to proponents of Japanese naval aviation, demonstrating that aircraft could contribute to the projection of naval power ashore.

Despite fierce rivalry between the Japanese army and navy, in the fall of 1937 General Matsui Iwane, the Army general in command of the Chinese theater, admitted the superiority of the Naval Air Services. His combat troops largely relied on the Navy for air support. Naval bombers such as the Mitsubishi G3M and Mitsubishi G4M were used to extensively bomb Chinese cities. Japanese fighter planes, notably the Mitsubishi Zero, were able to swiftly gain tactical air superiority, giving control of the skies over China to the Japanese. Unlike other naval air forces, the IJNAS was responsible for strategic bombing and operated long ranged bombers.

Japanese strategic bombing was mostly employed against large Chinese cities, such as Shanghai, Wuhan and Chongqing, which were struck by some 5,000 raids from February 1938 to August 1943.

The bombing of Nanjing and Guangzhou, which began on 22 and 23 September 1937, caused widespread international protest, culminating in a resolution by the Far Eastern Advisory Committee of the League of Nations. Lord Cranborne, the British Under-Secretary of State For Foreign Affairs, expressed his indignation in his own declaration.

Words cannot express the feelings of profound horror with which the news of these raids had been received by the whole civilized world. They are often directed against places far from the actual area of hostilities. The military objective, where it exists, seems to take a completely second place. The main object seems to be to inspire terror by the indiscriminate slaughter of civilians...»

== Pacific war ==
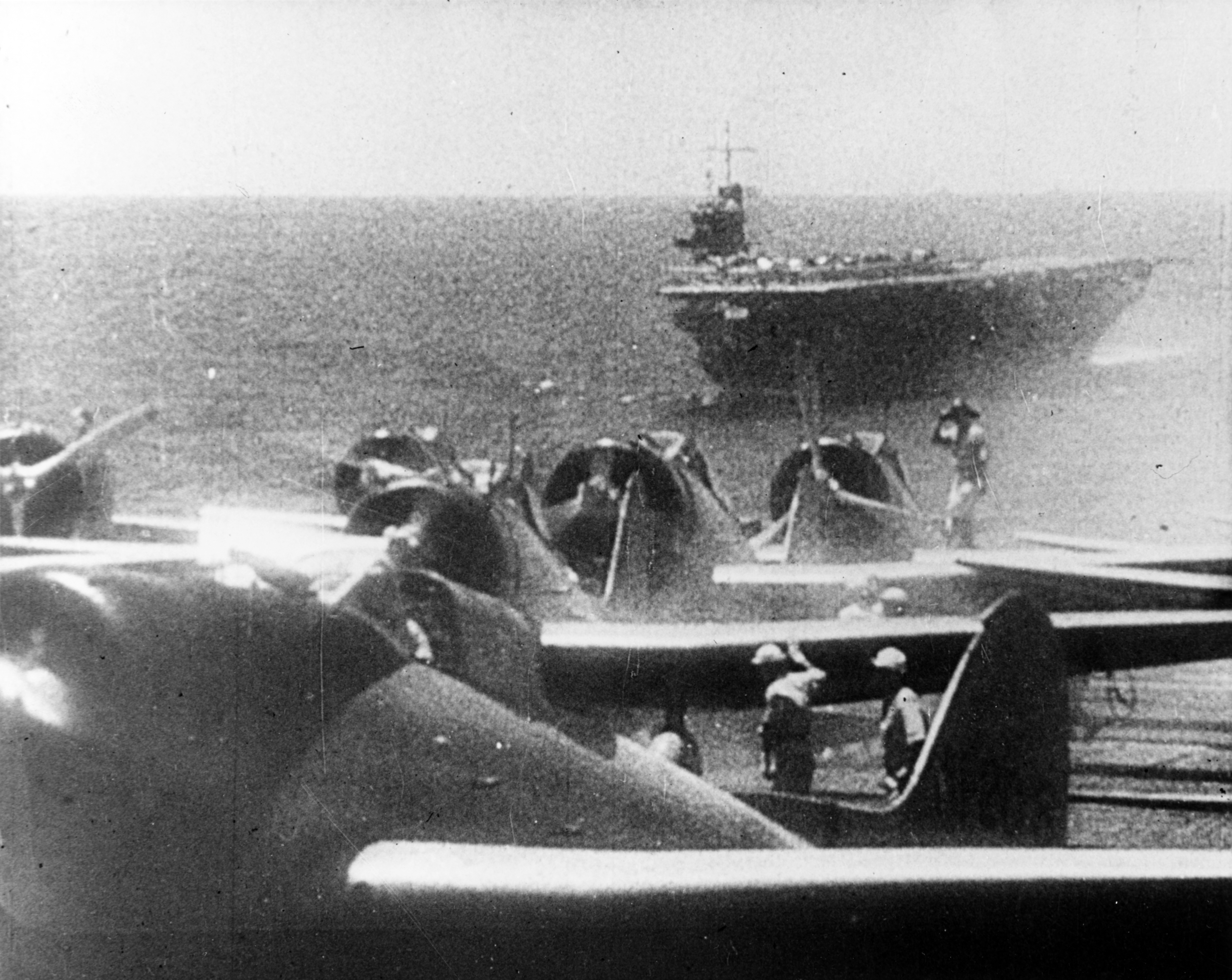
1st Air Fleet Aichi D3A dive bombers preparing to bomb American naval base in Pearl Harbor, Hawaii

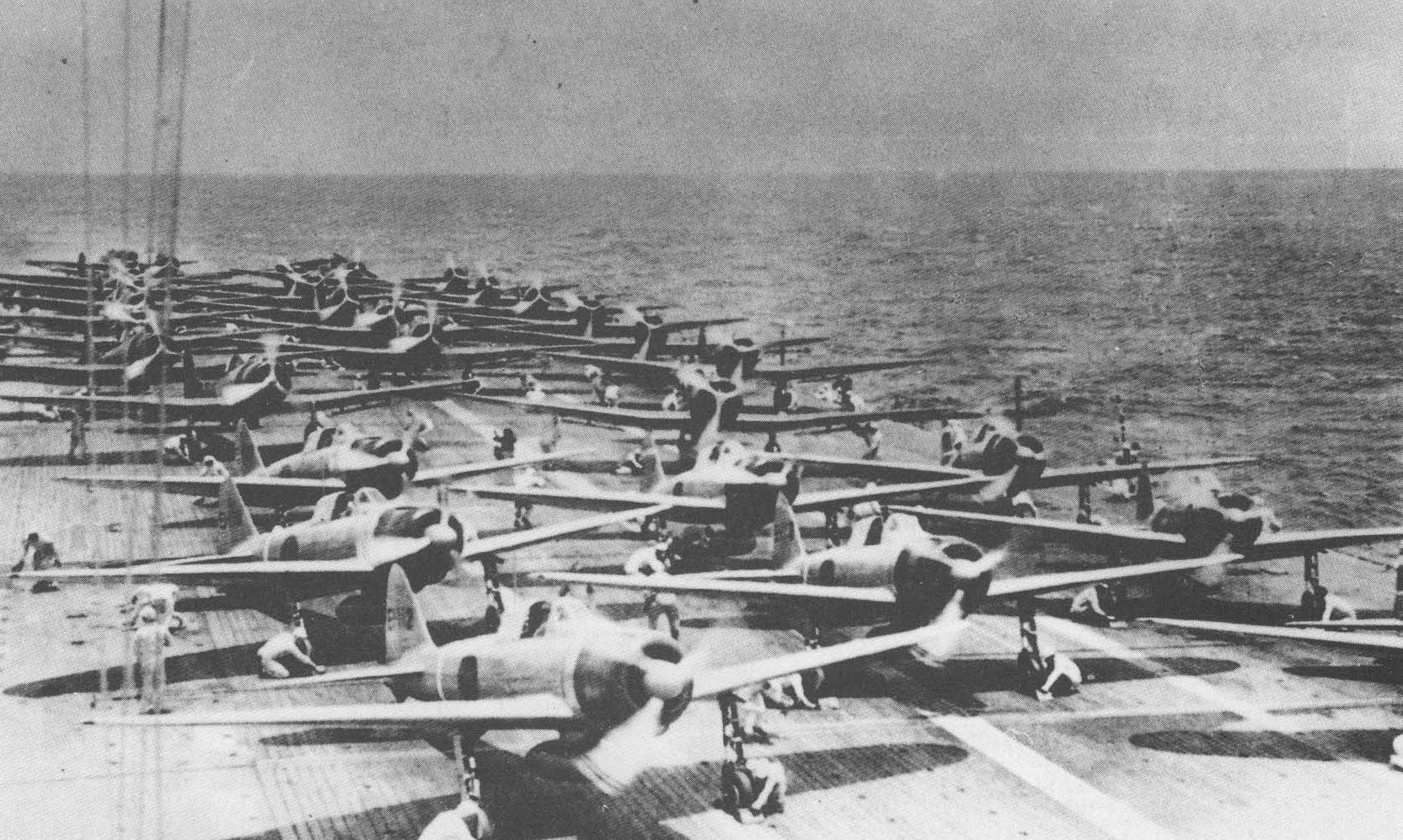
Mitsubishi A6M Zero fighter aircraft and other aircraft preparing for takeoff on the aircraft carrier Shōkaku on 7 December 1941, for the attack on Pearl Harbor

At the beginning of the Pacific War against the United States, the Imperial Japanese Navy possessed the most powerful carrier force in the world, through a combination of excellent ships, well-designed aircraft, and superior aviators. The Navy Air Service consisted of five naval air fleets. The Japanese possessed a total of ten aircraft carriers: six fleet carriers, three smaller carriers, and one training carrier. The 11th Air Fleet contained most of the IJN's land-based strike aircraft. A crucial advantage held by Japanese naval aviation at the onset of the war was the ability to effectively mass carrier air power. In April 1941 the First Air Fleet was created, concentrating the IJN's carriers into a single, powerful striking unit. The Kido Butai (Mobile Unit/Force) was the First Air Fleet's operational component. At the start of the war, three carrier divisions made up the Kido Butai. Unlike the United States Navy, where carrier divisions served only in an administrative capacity, the carrier divisions of the Kido Butai were operational entities. The two carriers in each division fought together, often exchanging aircraft squadrons and commanders on strikes as the situation required. The commander of the Kido Butai could command the combined aircraft of its three divisions as a single entity, launching massed airstrikes conducted by highly trained aviators at a single target.

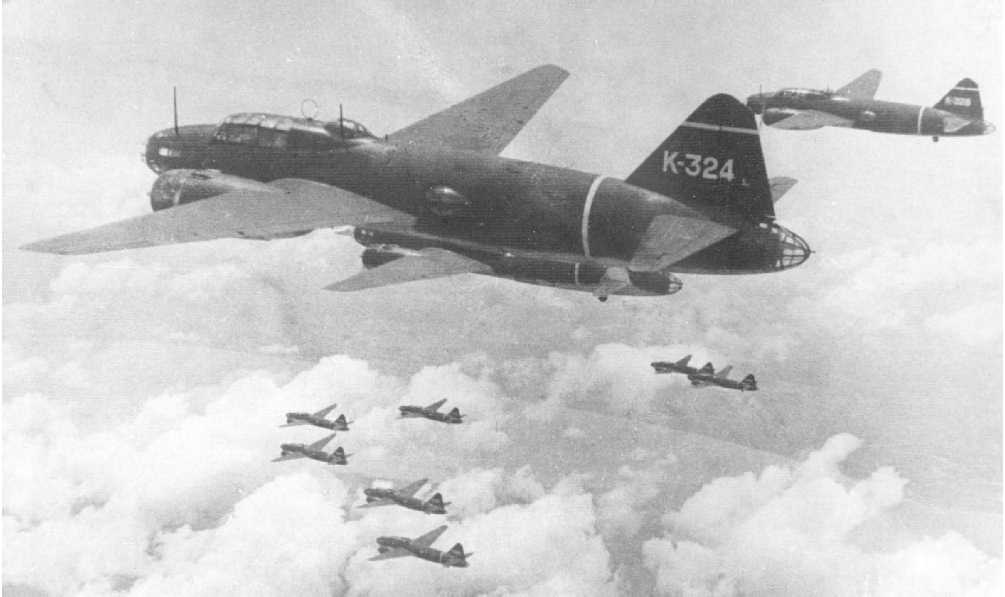
Early production G4M1s of Kanoya Kōkūtai with the original shape tail cones

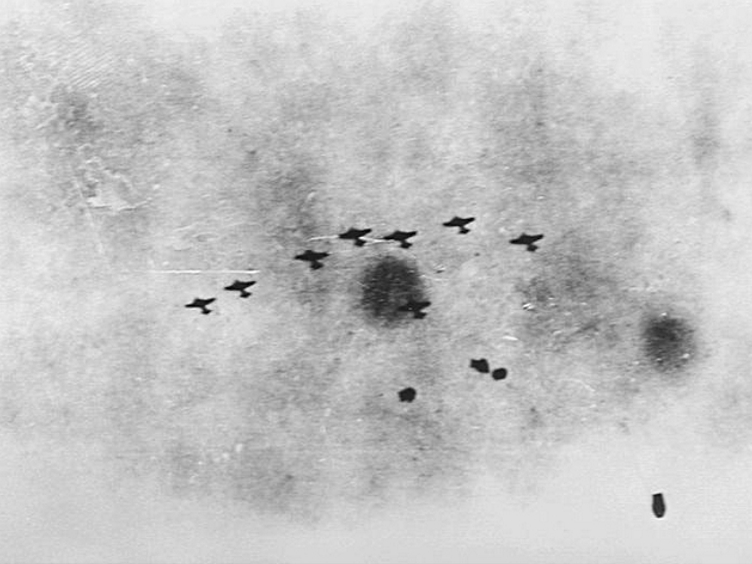
A formation of Japanese bombers taking anti-aircraft fire, seen from the Australian cruiser, HMAS Hobart

During the first six months of the war, Japanese naval air power achieved spectacular success and spearheaded offensive operations against Allied forces across the Pacific. On 7 December 1941, the IJN's Kido Butai attacked Pearl Harbor, crippling the U.S. Pacific Fleet and destroying over 188 American aircraft at the cost of 29 planes lost. On 10 December, Japanese naval land-based bombers, operating from bases in Indochina, sank HMS Prince of Wales and HMS Repulse, the first time that capital ships were sunk by aerial attack while underway. In April 1942, the Indian Ocean raid drove the Royal Navy from South East Asia. There were also air raids carried out on the Philippines and Darwin in northern Australia.

In these battles, the Japanese veterans of the war in China performed well against inexperienced Allied pilots flying obsolete aircraft. However, this advantage did not last. During numerous engagements in 1942, namely the Battle of the Coral Sea, the Battle of Midway, and again in the Guadalcanal Campaign (Battle of the Eastern Solomons and Battle of the Santa Cruz Islands), the Japanese lost hundreds of veteran pilots. Because the Japanese pilot training program was unable to increase its production rate throughout the war, those veterans could not be replaced, contributing to an irreversible erosion of Japanese air strength in the Pacific. Conversely, American pilot training programs were able to continually produce well-trained pilots throughout the war in continually increasing numbers. The American aircraft industry was able to rapidly produce new aircraft designs that rendered their Japanese opponents obsolescent in combat. Examination of crashed or captured Japanese aircraft revealed that they achieved their superior range and maneuverability by forgoing cockpit armor and self-sealing fuel tanks. Flight tests showed that they lost maneuverability at high speeds. American pilots were trained to take advantage of these weaknesses. Outdated and poorly-produced Japanese aircraft, piloted by increasingly lower-quality aircrew, suffered progressively greater losses in air engagements from late 1942 onward, particularly in the Battle of the Philippine Sea. By late 1944, Japanese naval air strength had been effectively crippled, with the remnants of the carrier-based First Air Fleet acting only as a decoy during the Battle of Leyte Gulf in October. Following the naval battle at Leyte, the remnants of Japanese naval aviation were limited to land-based operations, increasingly characterized by kamikaze attacks on American invasion fleets.

From 16 December 1941 to 20 March 1945, IJN aviation casualties were 14,242 aircrew and 1,579 officers killed in action.

=== Aircraft strength 1941 ===
The IJNAS had over 3,089 aircraft in 1941, along with 370 trainers.

- 1,830 first-line aircraft including:
  - 660 fighters, including 350 Mitsubishi Zeros
  - 330 carrier-based strike aircraft
  - 240 land-based, twin-engined bombers
  - 520 seaplanes (includes fighters and reconnaissance) and flying boats.

== Organization ==
The elite of the Japanese naval air corps were the carrier-based air groups (Kōkūtai, later called koku sentai) whose size (from a handful to 80 or 90 aircraft) was dependent on both the mission and type of aircraft carrier that they were on. Fleet carriers had three types of aircraft: fighters, level/torpedo planes, and dive bombers. Smaller carriers tended to have only two types, fighters and level/torpedo planes. The carrier-based Kōkūtai numbered over 1,500 pilots and just as many aircraft at the beginning of the Pacific War. The IJN also maintained a shore-based system of naval air fleets called Koku Kantai and area air fleets called homen kantai containing mostly twin-engine bombers and seaplanes. The senior command was the Eleventh Naval Air Fleet, commanded by Vice Admiral Nishizō Tsukahara. Land based aircraft provided the bulk of Japan's naval aviation up to the eve of World War II.

Each naval air fleet contained one or more naval air flotillas (commanded by Rear Admirals) each with two or more naval air groups. Each naval air group consisted of a base unit and 12 to 36 aircraft, plus four to 12 aircraft in reserve. Each naval air group consisted of several Squadrons (飛行隊, Hikōtai) of nine, 12 or 16 aircraft; this was the main IJN Air Service combat unit and was equivalent to a squadron (中隊, Chutai) in the Imperial Japanese Army Air Service. Each hikotai was commanded by a Lieutenant (j.g.), Warrant Officer, or experienced Chief Petty Officer, while most pilots were non-commissioned officers. There were usually four sections in each hikotai, each section (小隊, shōtai) with three or four aircraft; by mid-1944 it was common for a shotai to have four aircraft. There were over 90 naval air groups at the start of the Pacific War, each assigned either a name or a number. The named naval air groups were usually linked to a particular navy air command or a navy base. They were usually numbered when they left Japan.

== See also ==
- Imperial Japanese Army Air Service
- List of military aircraft of Japan
- Imperial Japanese Navy Aviation Bureau
- List of A6M Reisen operators
- List of Japanese Navy Air Force aces (Mitsubishi A6M)
- List of radar models of the Imperial Japanese Navy
- List of bombs used by the Imperial Japanese Navy
- List of weapons on Japanese combat aircraft
- List of Aircraft engines in use of Japanese Navy Air Force
- Japanese marine paratroopers of World War II
- Air raids on Japan
