= Pug Southerland =

American World War II flying ace

James J. Southerland
- Born: October 28, 1911; Narberth, Pennsylvania
- Died: October 12, 1949 (aged 37); Jacksonville, Florida
- Military career
- Allegiance: United States
- Branch: United States Navy
- Service years: 1936–1949
- Rank: Commander
- Nickname: "Pug"
- Commands: VF-5; VF-83; VF-23
- Conflicts: World War II: Guadalcanal Campaign; Battle of Okinawa
- Awards: Silver Star; Distinguished Flying Cross (2); Purple Heart
- Other work: Flight instructor

James Julien "Pug" Southerland II (October 28, 1911 – October 12, 1949) was a United States Navy fighter pilot during World War II. He was an ace, having been credited with five victories (some accounts say seven), flying Grumman F4F Wildcats. He was awarded the Silver Star, Distinguished Flying Cross twice, and the Purple Heart.

== Early life ==
Born in Narberth, Montgomery County, Pennsylvania, Southerland graduated from the United States Naval Academy at Annapolis, Maryland, in 1936. Rear Admiral David Richardson, who served with him, said Southerland gained the nickname "Pug" because he was such a pugnacious boxer at the academy. Southerland became an aviator and meant to make the Navy his career.

== World War II ==
=== Dogfight over Guadalcanal ===
At the beginning of the Battle of Guadalcanal, August 7, 1942, American forces shelled Guadalcanal and neighboring Tulagi in the Solomon Islands. Soon after the attack began, 27 Japanese bombers and an escort of 17 fighters took off from Rabaul, Japan's stronghold and strategic base in the South Pacific. Their mission was to bomb the ships that were supporting the American attack.

Lieutenant Southerland commanded a group of eight American Wildcats aboard the USS Saratoga as a part of VF-5. Due to planning errors and the loss of planes to a recent training exercise, this was the only fighter cover available to patrol the landing area. Southerland (flying Wildcat F-12) and his flight took off to intercept the Japanese bombers before they could reach the American ships.

Southerland shot down the first Japanese aircraft of the Guadalcanal campaign, a G4M1 "Betty" bomber of the 4th Kōkūtai, under the command of PO2c Tomotsu Sato. After shooting down a second bomber, Southerland was engaged in a dogfight with an A6M2 "Zero", piloted by PO3c Ichirobei Yamazaki of the Tainan Kōkūtai. He lined up the Zero in his sights, only to find his guns would not fire, having either jammed or run out of ammunition.

Although he was now defenseless, Southerland had to stay in the fight. Two more Zeros engaged him, as PO2c Enji Kakimoto and PO3c Kazushi Uto joined Yamazaki's assault, but he successfully outmaneuvered all three of them. Southerland analyzed their tactics. Two fighters worked their runs from opposite flanks, while the third waited to take its turn. He coolly and carefully executed his defensive maneuvers. The dogfight was spotted by PO1c Saburo Sakai, who also joined the battle. Sakai dealt the final blow to Southerland's Wildcat, striking it below the left wing-root with his 20 mm cannon. Southerland's Grumman was shared jointly between Sakai, Uto, and Yamazaki. Southerland later wrote:

My plane was in bad shape, but still performing nicely in low blower, full throttle, and full low pitch. Flaps and radio had been put out of commission...The after part of my fuselage was like a sieve. She was still smoking from incendiary, but not on fire. All of the ammunition box cover on my left wing was gone and 20 mm explosives had torn some gaping holes in its upper surface...My instrument panel was badly shot up, goggles on my forehead had been shattered, my rear-view mirror was broken, my plexiglass windshield was riddled. The leak-proof tanks had apparently been punctured many times, as some fuel had leaked down into the bottom of the cockpit, even though there was no steady leakage. My oil tank had been punctured and oil was pouring down my right leg. At this time, a Zero making a run from the port quarter put a burst in just under the left wing-root and good old 5-F-12 finally exploded. I think the explosion occurred from gasoline vapor. The flash was below and forward of my left foot. I was ready for it...Consequently, I dove over the right side just aft immediately, though I don't remember how.

As Southerland bailed out of his doomed Wildcat, his .45 caliber automatic pistol caught in the cockpit. He managed to free himself, but lost his pistol, leaving him weaponless, wounded, and alone behind enemy lines. Suffering from 11 wounds, shock, and exhaustion, Southerland struggled through the brush, carefully evading Japanese soldiers. He finally reached the coast, where he was found by some natives, who at the risk of their own lives, fed him and treated his wounds. With their assistance, he eluded Japanese ground forces and returned to American lines. Southerland was evacuated from Guadalcanal on the first patrol boat to land at Henderson Field, on August 20, 1942. On February 14, 1948, the wreckage of Southerland's Wildcat was found, including his pistol. Investigation of the remains confirmed these accounts of the dogfight.

=== Later war ===
Southerland later fought in the Battle of Okinawa in 1945. By then a commander and leading VF-83 aboard the USS Essex, he shot down two Ki-61 "Tonys". He became a confirmed ace in April of that year when he downed an A6M "Zeke" while serving aboard the USS Langley.

== Last years ==
Following the war, Southerland became a flight instructor at the U.S. Naval Academy. He was killed in a jet training accident in 1949 during takeoff from a carrier off the Florida coast.
