= Samurai! =

1957 book by Martin Caidin

- First edition (publ. E. P. Dutton)
- Author: Saburo Sakai with Fred Saito and Martin Caidin
- Language: English
- Published: 1957
- Publisher: E.P. Dutton and Company, Inc.
- Publication place: United States
- Pages: 382
- OCLC: 13306376

Samurai! is a 1957 autobiographical book on Saburo Sakai, ghostwritten by Martin Caidin based on interviews with Fred Saito. It describes the life and career of Sakai, a Japanese combat aviator who fought against American fighter pilots in the Pacific Theater of World War II, surviving the war as one of Japan's leading flying aces. Caidin wrote the prose of the book, basing its contents on Saito's interviews with Sakai as well as on Sakai's own memoirs.

According to an analysis of official Japanese records, Sakai had 28 aerial victories, which includes shared victories, while the book claims 64 kills. The same source claims that Martin Caidin intentionally inflated those numbers to generate publicity for that book. It also attests that many of the stories written in his books are fiction and that the claims made in Samurai! are very different from the content of Japanese works on his life.

In a 1998 interview with writer Naoki Kodachi, Sakai claimed to have never met Caidin prior to the book's publication, and that the 64 kills number was made up, possibly as an allusion to the battles of Miyamoto Musashi. However he claimed the true number is "not far off".

== See also ==
Winged Samurai: Saburo Sakai and the Zero Fighter Pilots - 1985 book by Henry Sakaida dealing with the wartime history of Saburō Sakai
