= Watari Handa =

Japanese flying ace

- 半田 亘理
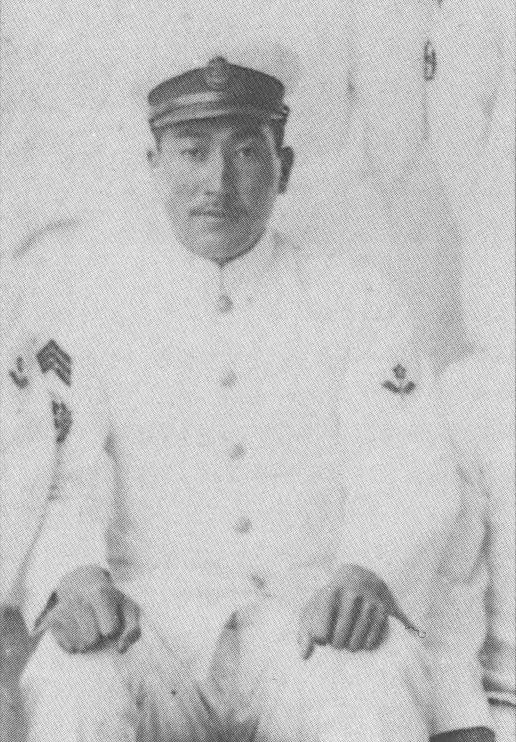
- Born: 22 August 1911; Fukuoka, Japan
- Died: 1948 (aged 36–37)
- Military career
- Allegiance: Empire of Japan
- Branch: Imperial Japanese Navy Air Service (IJN)
- Service years: 1928–1942
- Rank: Lieutenant Junior Grade
- Conflicts: Second Sino-Japanese War; World War II; Pacific War

Watari Handa (半田 亘理, Handa Watari; 22 August 1911 – 1948) was an officer and ace fighter pilot in the Imperial Japanese Navy (IJN) during the Second Sino-Japanese War and the Pacific theater of World War II. In aerial combat over China and the Pacific, he was officially credited with having destroyed 13 enemy aircraft.

On 13 May 1942, as a member of the Tainan Air Group based at Lae, New Guinea, Handa asked fellow Tainan ace Saburō Sakai to lend him his wingman, Toshiaki Honda, for a reconnaissance mission over Port Moresby. During the mission, the Japanese pilots were ambushed by enemy P-39 fighters and Honda was shot down and killed. Broken in spirit by Honda's death, Handa soon developed tuberculosis and was evacuated to Japan. After fighting the disease for six years, Handa died in 1948, telling his wife on his deathbed, "I have fought bravely all my life, but I could never forgive myself for having lost Sakai's wingman at Lae."
