= Donald M. McPherson =

American WWII fighter pilot (1922–2025)

- Born: May 25, 1922; Adams, Nebraska, U.S.
- Died: August 14, 2025 (aged 103); Lincoln, Nebraska, U.S.
- Burial place: Highland Cemetery; Adams, Nebraska, U.S.
- Spouse: Thelma Johnston (m. 1944; died 1998)
- Children: 4
- Military career
- Allegiance: United States
- Branch: United States Navy
- Service years: 1943–1946
- Rank: Ensign
- Nickname: 'Don'
- Unit: VF-83
- Conflicts: World War II; Battle of Okinawa
- Awards: Distinguished Flying Cross (3); Air Medal (4)

Donald Melvin McPherson (May 25, 1922 – August 14, 2025) was a United States Navy fighter ace during World War II. He was the last living American flying ace of World War II.

== Early life ==
McPherson was born in Adams, Nebraska, on May 25, 1922.

== Military career ==
After the United States Navy's V-5 Aviation Cadet Program waived its two-year college requirement, McPherson enlisted in the Navy on January 5, 1943, and was appointed as an aviation cadet on February 4, 1944. He earned his commission and naval aviator wings on August 12, 1944, at NAS Corpus Christi in Texas.

=== World War II ===
On August 13, 1944, following graduation from flight school, he traveled to Daytona Beach, Florida, for advanced training in combat tactics. He reported to Flight 81 on August 18, a combat replacement unit where he spent the next three months training in fighter tactics, dive-bombing and gunnery. On October 1, McPherson received orders to report to Naval Air Station Glenview in Illinois, for carrier qualification training. By November 8, he began practicing landings on the USS Wolverine (IX-64). His first attempt resulted in a gear failure, but he successfully landed on his second try. He then moved to USS Sable (IX-81), where he completed eight landings. This training equipped McPherson for his overseas combat tour.

After completing his training at Glenview, he briefly returned home in Adams, Nebraska. He then received orders to report to Naval Air Station San Diego for further assignment. Upon reporting to San Diego on December 8, he was informed that he and his unit would not leave for overseas duty until December 18. On December 18, he boarded a seaplane tender bound for Pearl Harbor. Upon arrival at Pearl Harbor, he was assigned to VF-100 to undergo refresher training. Training commenced at Naval Air Station Barbers Point where pilots participated in organized tactical training. On January 6, 1945, McPherson performed his first landings on an Essex-class aircraft carrier off Hawaii. Over the following days, the pilots practiced arrested landings on carriers.

On February 18, 1945, McPherson was ordered to report to VF-83, which was equipped with the Grumman F6F Hellcat, as a replacement pilot. On the following day, he boarded a British troopship bound for Ulithi Atoll in the Caroline Islands. On March 10, VF-83 was assigned to carrier USS Essex (CV-9). On March 13, he flew his first combat mission on a combat air patrol mission over Ulithi. On March 19, he took part in a 300 mi (480 km) pre-dawn attack on Nittigahara airfield in Kyushu. During the attack, he destroyed a Mitsubishi G4M 'Betty' bomber on the ground. As he pulled up from the attack run, the engine of his F6F Hellcat quit. He managed to activate the manual fuel pump and restart his engine. He was then struck by anti-aircraft fire. Despite this, McPherson managed to nurse his F6F back to Essex.

Following this, McPherson continued to fly ground-attack strikes on Japanese targets. On April 6, during a mission to counter kamikaze strikes against American ships during the Battle of Okinawa, McPherson shot down two Aichi D3A 'Val' dive bombers near Kikaijima, with other VF-83 pilots shooting down over 67 other Japanese planes. On May 4, he shot down three Yokosuka K5Y 'Willow' floatplanes that were attempting a kamikaze strike, earning him the title of flying ace.

McPherson left military service following the end of World War II. He was awarded three Distinguished Flying Crosses and four Air Medals for his actions during the war. He flew an F6F bearing the name Death 'n Destruction.

== Later life and death ==
McPherson married Thelma Johnston on August 17, 1944, and they were together until her death in 1998. The couple had two daughters and two sons. Following his military service, he returned home to Adams, Nebraska, where he worked as a farmer and also for many years as a rural letter carrier. He also coached youth sports and was a scout leader, and was involved with the local Methodist church.

In 2015, he along with other flying aces received the Congressional Gold Medal, in recognition of "their heroic military service and defense of the country's freedom throughout the history of aviation warfare." On May 25, 2022, McPherson turned 100. On September 28, 2024, at the age of 102, he flew in a restored F6F Hellcat.

McPherson died under hospice care in Lincoln, Nebraska on August 14, 2025, at the age of 103. He was the last of the American flying aces of World War II. He was buried with full military honors, including with flyover, at the Highland Cemetery in Adams.

== Bibliography ==
- Hammel, Eric (2020). Aces at War: The American Aces Speak (Hardcover). Vol. IV. Independently published. ISBN 9798576101603. OCLC 1506542400.
- Oleson, James A. (2011). In Their Own Words—the Final Chapter: True Stories from American Fighter Aces (Hardcover). ISBN 9781450290463. OCLC 1124482266.
