= Champlin Fighter Museum =

Defunct aviation museum in Mesa, Arizona

Coordinates: 33.4548°N 111.7305°W

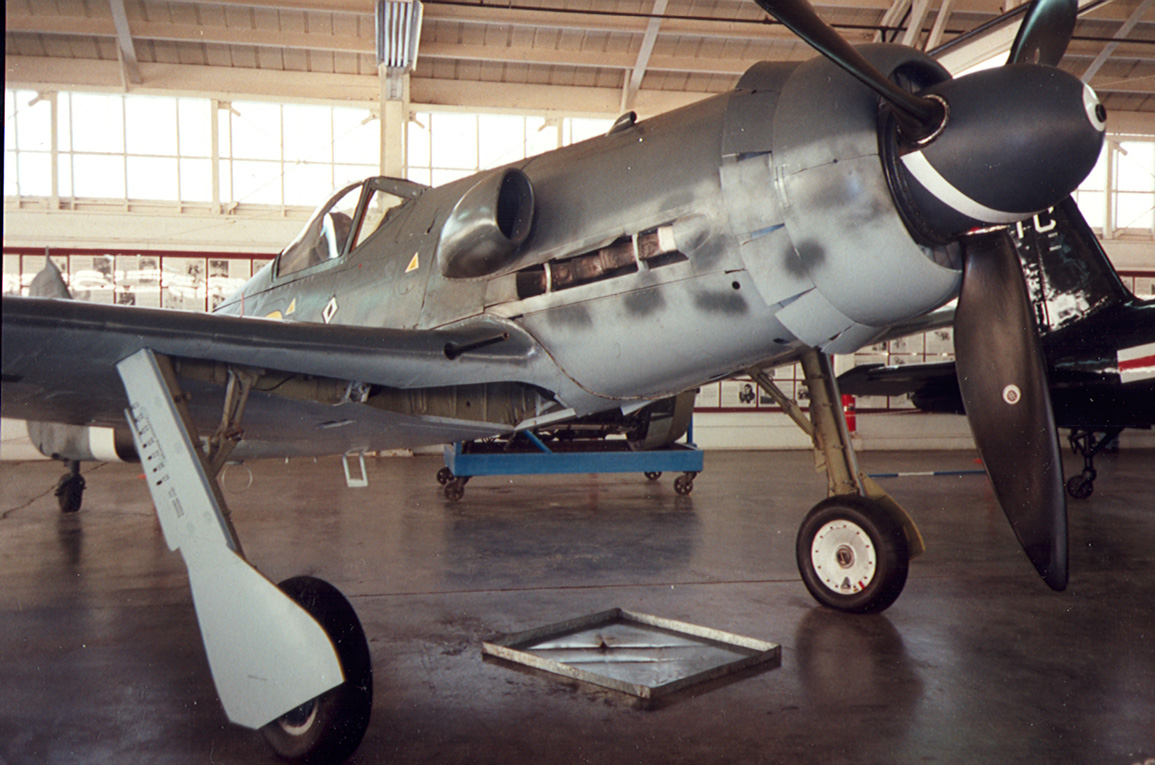
A Focke-Wulf Fw 190, at the Champlin Fighter Museum (c.1995)

The Champlin Fighter Museum was an aircraft museum located at Mesa, Arizona. It specialized in airworthy World War I and World War II fighters. After 22 years of operation, the museum was closed on May 26, 2003, and its collection was moved to the Museum of Flight at Seattle's Boeing Field.

It also published books related to aviation, such as Henry Sakaida's 1985 book Winged Samurai: Saburo Sakai and the Zero Fighter Pilots.

== See also ==
- List of aviation museums
