= Shimakawa =

Shimakawa (written: 島川 lit. "island river") is a Japanese surname. Notable people with the surname include:

- Masaaki Shimakawa (島川 正明; 1921–1997), Japanese World War II flying ace
- Takuya Shimakawa (島川拓也; born 1998), Japanese freestyle skier
- Toshio Shimakawa (島川 俊郎; born 1990), Japanese footballer
