= Masaaki Shimakawa =

- 島川 正明
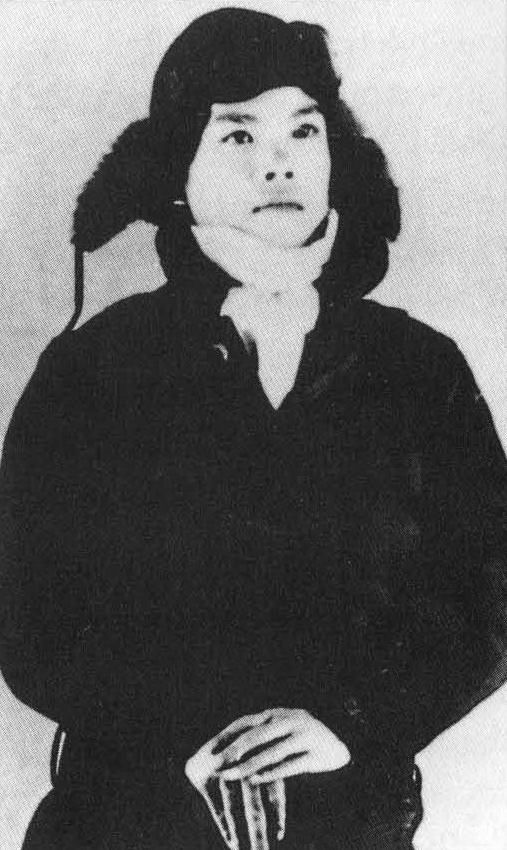
- Born: December 1921; Tokushima, Japan
- Died: 25 September 1997 (aged 75)
- Military career
- Allegiance: Empire of Japan
- Branch: Imperial Japanese Navy Air Service (IJN)
- Service years: 1939–1945
- Rank: Warrant Officer
- Conflicts: World War II; Pacific War

Masaaki Shimakawa (島川 正明, Shimakawa Masaaki; December 1921 – 25 September 1997) was a warrant officer and ace fighter pilot in the Imperial Japanese Navy (IJN) during the Pacific theater of World War II. In aerial combat over the Pacific he was officially credited with destroying eight enemy aircraft with 12 or 13 assists.

Shimakawa was a member of the Tainan Air Group at the beginning of the Pacific War. Often assigned as a wingman to legendary ace Saburō Sakai, Shimakawa fought in the conquest of the Philippines and the Dutch East Indies campaign. In April 1942, Shimakawa was transferred to the aircraft carrier Kaga's fighter group, with which he participated in the Battle of Midway.

Surviving the loss of his carrier at Midway, Shimakawa was reassigned to the 204th Air Group with which he was assigned to the Solomon Islands campaign in August 1942. Based on Bougainville, Shimakawa and his comrades frequently tangled with the Cactus Air Force over Guadalcanal during the battle for that island. Stricken with malaria, Shimakawa was evacuated to Japan in March 1943.

After recovering from his illness, Shimakawa served as an instructor pilot with the Omura Air Group and various other units until the war ended in September 1945. Shimakawa died on 25 September 1997.
