= Junichi Sasai =

Japanese Naval aviation officer (1918–1942)

- 笹井 醇一
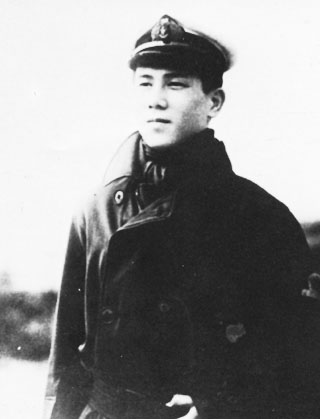
- Sasai in May 1941
- Born: February 13, 1918; Tokyo, Japan
- Died: August 26, 1942 (aged 24); Henderson Field, Guadalcanal, Solomon Islands
- Burial place: Tama Cemetery, Fuchū, Tokyo, Japan
- Military career
- Allegiance: Empire of Japan
- Branch: Imperial Japanese Navy Air Service (IJN)
- Service years: 1936–1942
- Rank: Lieutenant commander (posthumous)
- Nicknames: "Prince of Rabaul" "Shamo" (Gamecock)
- Unit: Tainan Air Group
- Conflicts: World War II; Pacific War; Philippines campaign; Dutch East Indies campaign; Guadalcanal campaign †
- Awards: Order of the Golden Kite

Lieutenant Commander Junichi Sasai (笹井 醇一, Sasai Jun'ichi; February 13, 1918 – August 26, 1942) was a Japanese naval aviator and fighter ace of the Imperial Japanese Navy during World War II. Sasai was killed leading his fighter squadron during an attack on Henderson Field during the Battle of Guadalcanal.

== Early life ==
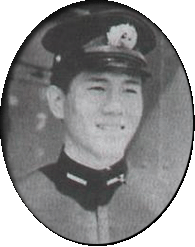
Sasai as an ensign

Junichi Sasai was born on February 13, 1918, in Tokyo. He was the son of a captain of the Japanese Imperial Navy, and even in his youth, Sasai was destined to enter the navy. Sasai's childhood was marked by poor health, and he was always mobbed by his classmates. Physical exercises like judo, together with a balanced diet, improved his health. Sasai attended Tokyo Municipal High School No. 1.

He went on to the Imperial Japanese Naval Academy at Etajima, an island off the coast of Kure, Hiroshima. Junichi Sasai held a black belt in judo and competed in wrestling. In his early days at the Eta Jima Academy, he earned the nickname "gamecock" because of his stamina and vehemence for life. After graduating from the 67th Naval Academy Class (ranking 152 out of 248 Cadets) and being appointed an ensign (少尉) in 1939, Sasai enrolled in the 35th Aviation Student Course. He finished his naval aviation training in November 1941 and became a fighter pilot. Sasai's brother-in-law, Lieutenant Commander Yoshio Tashiro, was also a naval aviator, serving as a flying boat commander.

== World War II ==
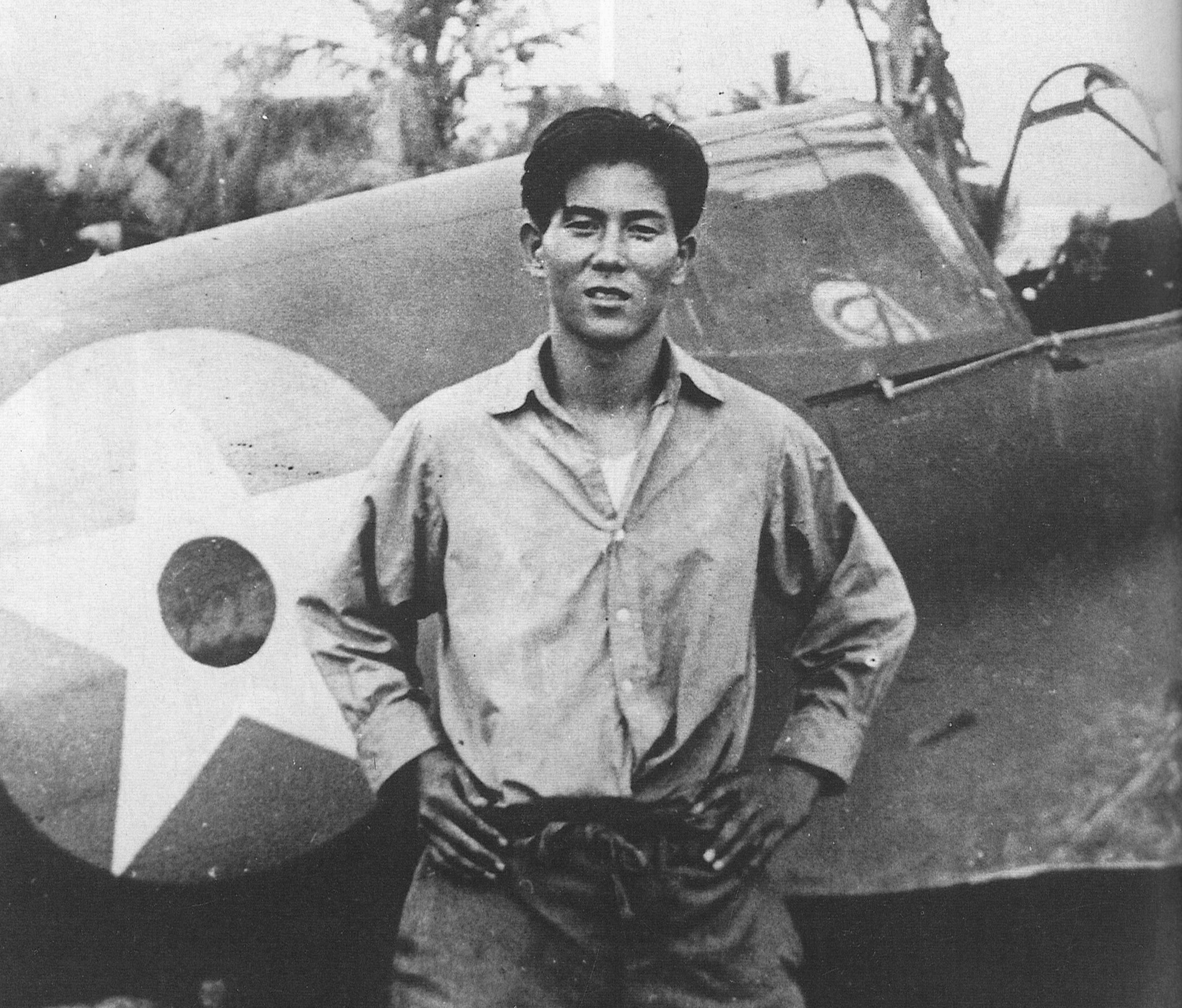
Sasai standing before a crashed Curtiss P-40 in the Dutch East Indies, 1941.

On December 10, 1941, Ensign Sasai, as a member of the Tainan Air Group, which would become one of the Navy's premier fighter units, participated in the Pacific War's opening actions in the Philippines during the attack on Luzon, but he was forced to abort the mission due to engine trouble. On February 2, 1942, Sasai got his first aerial kill in the Dutch East Indies at Maospati airfield, Java, when he downed a Dutch Brewster Buffalo. Sixteen days later, Sasai shot down a Curtiss P-40E of 17th Squadron with the machine guns of his Mitsubishi A6M Zero.

=== Papua New Guinea ===
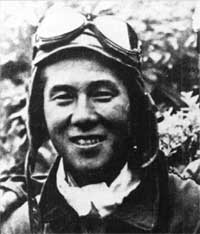
Sasai wearing flight gear. This 1942 photo shows Sasai shortly before his death over Guadalcanal on August 26.

The Tainan Kōkūtai (Air Group) was transferred to Lae on Papua New Guinea in March 1942, reorganizing with new officers. Among his Tainan equals, Sasai was known as "Flying Tiger", a reference to the tiger-head belt buckle he wore always, a gift from his father. In his lodgings, he kept an image of legendary Japanese war hero Minamoto no Yoshitsune.

Already a lieutenant (j.g.), Sasai became Buntaicho (squadron leader), leading the 3rd Chutai (squadron), consisting of six planes, divided in two Shotai's (sections). Each squadron leader's Zero was recognisable by two light blue diagonal stripes across its fuselage, while each section leader's bore one. On each tail, there was a black letter V, the Tainan Group identifier, followed by a three-digit number in the 100s series identifying each aircraft. Sasai was now flying with experienced pilots in his squadron, including Saburō Sakai, Enji Kakimoto and Toshio Ohta. Saburō Sakai, leading the second section in Sasai's squadron, was an experienced aviator, having flown aerial combat since early in the Second Sino-Japanese War in 1938 and 1939. Sasai learned the art of aerial combat from the experienced Sakai and the two of them became a great team. Sasai became an ace pilot and owed his life and much of his development as a fighter pilot to Sakai.

Sasai was considered an exceptional officer by his subordinates, mainly for his compassionate qualities. In private, he ridiculed the inflexibility and austerity of the navy caste system. Such disdain was demonstrated amply by the level of personal interest he took in his NCO subordinates. The Japanese caste system was strict, but Sasai cared more for his fliers. Saburō Sakai, flying as a warrant officer and section leader in Sasai's squadron, said in an interview:

The navy had a very rigid hierarchy and caste system; officers never made friends with enlisted men, it was not allowed. But Sasai was a different kind of officer.

...

Ohta, Nishizawa and I joined our fighters wingtip to wingtip and did three perfect consecutive loops over the field following a dogfight. After we landed we were very proud of ourselves. Then we had a message that the commander at Moresby had sent a letter to our commander, Sasai, describing our stunt, and inviting us back. Sasai chewed us out and threatened us with grounding if we ever did that again. He was just following procedure, but we knew he was secretly proud of us.

On April 11, Lieutenant Sasai led nine Zeros scouting over Moresby in three "V" formations. The Japanese had not adopted the finger-four formation that had become common practice in Europe, instead flying in sections of three planes in a staggered formation, the second plane about one hundred yards behind and above the leader and the third on the other side another hundred yards further away, both wingmen weaving as they kept watch for enemy aircraft.

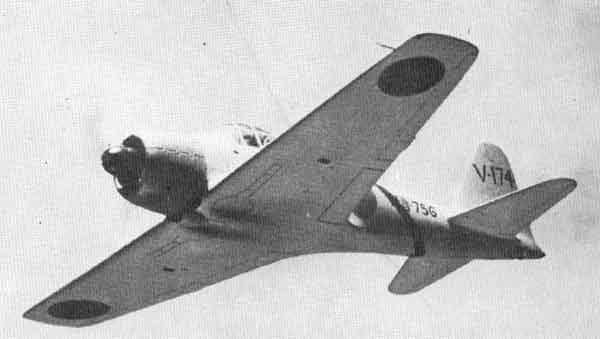
"V-174", a Zero Model A6M3 Type 32 of the Tainan Kōkūtai.

On May 4, 1942, Sasai became an ace, when he shot down three Bell P-39 Airacobras in only 20 seconds. On May 24, Sasai downed a North American B-25 Mitchell from the 13th US Squadron, 3rd Bomb Group.

On July 11, 1942, Lieutenant (j.g.) Sasai led 12 Zeros providing fighter escort for 21 bombers from Rabaul heading for Port Moresby. En route, they encountered six Boeing B-17 Flying Fortresses of the 19th Bomb Group. Sasai gave the order to attack the B-17s, so Sakai, Nishizawa, Ohta and two others joined Sasai. They failed to shoot down any of the B-17s, but lost one of their Zeros. After the protective close air support fighters left, the Japanese bomber attack was interdicted by Port Moresby's fighters and disrupted. Sasai received a severe reprimand for leaving his bombers. According to Sakai, Sasai's decision was poor, but he and the rest of the pilots sympathized with him because bombers had been hitting their base regularly, and they all wanted to get a piece of the B-17s that had been giving them so much trouble.

On August 2, Sasai attacked a B-17 using a new head-on tactic, shooting the four-engined bomber down.

=== Rabaul ===
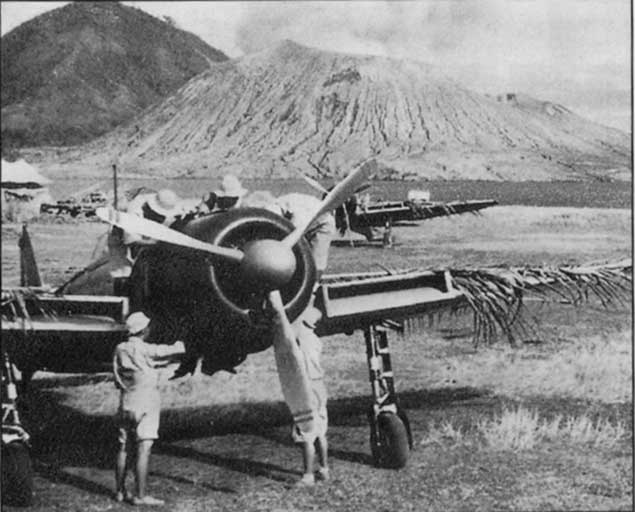
Zero Type 21 at Rabaul with Hanabuki volcano as background. The volcano's continuous activity was a good visual guide for the pilots.

The Tainan Air Group moved from Lae to Lakunai airfield on Rabaul the next day. Rabaul soon became known as "the fighter pilot graveyard" by the Japanese, not only because of the fierce combat but also because malaria, mosquitoes and various tropical diseases decimated the Japanese pilots. The Americans treated their airbases with the insecticide DDT, but the Japanese had no similar solution.

On August 7, word arrived that U.S. Marines had landed at 5:20 that morning on Guadalcanal. Due to bad weather, the Allied expeditionary force had arrived undetected by the Japanese. Without delay, 17 Zeros of the Tainan Group escorted 27 Mitsubishi G4M Betty bombers of the 4th Ku. in an attack on the U.S. Navy task force supporting the invasion. The Japanese were met by 18 Grumman F4F-4 Wildcat fighters and 16 Douglas Douglas SBD-3 Dauntless dive bombers from the aircraft carriers Saratoga, Enterprise and Wasp. From mid-1942, F4F Wildcat fighter pilots used a new aerial combat tactic, the "Thach Weave", developed by the US naval aviators John Thach and Edward O'Hare. The Zero pilots from Rabaul were initially confounded by this double-team maneuver. Nevertheless, Sasai was credited with five F4Fs in this first air battle between land-based Zeros and American carrier fighters.

During this same engagement, Saburō Sakai, leading the second section in Sasai's squadron, sustained grievous injuries from the return fire of carrier-based bombers he had mistaken for Wildcats. After a few days in hospital, Sakai was informed that he would be returning to Japan for eye surgery. The evening before his departure, Sasai bade him farewell at his bedside, giving him his tiger-head belt buckle and saying to him, "Please go back to Japan and please come back to Rabaul!"

=== Final mission ===
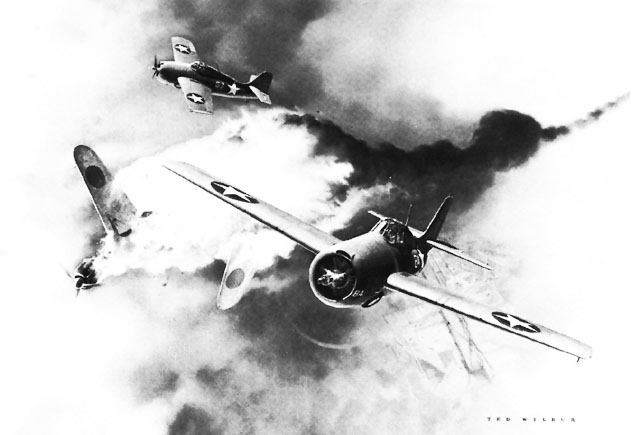
Illustration of a U.S. Marine F4F-4 Wildcat shooting down a Japanese A6M2 Zero over Henderson Field on Guadalcanal.

On August 26, 1942, on his 76th sortie with the Tainan Group, Sasai led eight Zeros escorting Betty bombers to Henderson Field, a main focus of months of fighting in the Guadalcanal campaign, as it enabled U.S. land-based airpower to hinder the Japanese attempts at resupplying its soldiers. At that time, Sasai's score stood at 27. Over Guadalcanal, Sasai attacked an F4F Wildcat. The Wildcat dived for the cover of anti-aircraft guns, then gave chase. The Zero turned to engage from overhead; the Grumman pulled its nose into the vertical, firing its six .50-caliber machine guns. The lack of self-sealing fuel tanks made Japanese Zeros easy to ignite with a few rounds of incendiary ammunition. Sasai's Zero exploded in a ball of fire, showering parts onto the beach of Guadalcanal in front of hundreds of U.S. Marines.

Lieutenant Junior Grade Junichi Sasai died at the age of 24. He was probably shot down by Captain Marion E. Carl of VMF-223. One of the few Marine fighter pilots to survive the Battle of Midway, Carl had become the US Marine Corps’ first ace on August 24. Carl would end the war with 18.5 victories, and would retire at the rank of Major General.

Sasai, a lieutenant junior grade, was posthumously promoted two grades to lieutenant commander. This practice was common for Japanese aviators with proven records or high scores who were killed during the war. Sasai was also honored with a mention in an all-units bulletin of the Japanese Navy.

Sasai is commemorated alongside his father at Tama Cemetery in Fuchū, Tokyo.
