= Winged Samurai: Saburo Sakai and the Zero Fighter Pilots =

- Author: Henry Sakaida
- Language: English
- Published: 1985
- Publisher: Champlin Fighter Museum Press
- Publication place: United States
- Pages: 159
- ISBN: 0-912173-05-X

Winged Samurai: Saburo Sakai and the Zero Fighter Pilots is a 1985 book by Henry Sakaida dealing with the wartime history of Saburō Sakai and other Imperial Japanese Navy Air Service pilots who flew the Mitsubishi A6M Zero. It was published by Champlin Fighter Museum Press.

== See also ==
Samurai! - Autobiographical book by Saburo Sakai co-written with Fred Saito and Martin Caidin
