= Toshio Ōta =

Japanese WW2 flying ace (1919–1942)

- 太田 敏夫
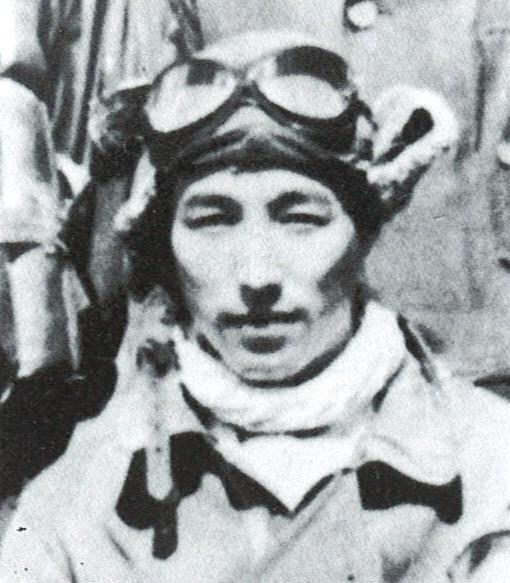
- Born: 20 March 1919; Nagasaki, Japan
- Died: 21 October 1942 (aged 23); Guadalcanal
- Military career
- Allegiance: Empire of Japan
- Branch: Imperial Japanese Navy Air Service (IJN)
- Rank: Petty Officer First Class
- Unit: Tainan Air Group
- Conflicts: World War II; Pacific War

Toshio Ōta (太田 敏夫, Ōta Toshio; 20 March 1919 – 21 October 1942) was a World War II Japanese fighter ace. In early 1942, at the age of 22, he flew a Mitsubishi A6M Zero with the Lae-based Tainan Air Group. There the young petty officer, 1st class became one of the so-called "Clean-up Trio" of Japanese aces, along with his squadron mates Saburo Sakai and Hiroyoshi Nishizawa.

Ōta's first confirmed kill, of a U.S. Army Air Force P-40E Warhawk, was over New Guinea on April 11, 1942. Transferred to Rabaul in August, Ōta was killed in a dogfight with U.S. Marine Corps Grumman F4F Wildcats over Guadalcanal on October 21, shortly after shooting down a Wildcat himself. His victorious opponent is believed to be 1st Lt. Frank C. Drury of VMF-212. Ōta is credited with 34 victories, making him the Imperial Japanese Navy's fourth-ranking ace.

In his autobiography, Sakai described Ōta as outgoing and amiable, in contrast to the more reserved Nishizawa, and said he would have been "more at home in a nightclub" than in Lae.
