= Tainan Air Group =

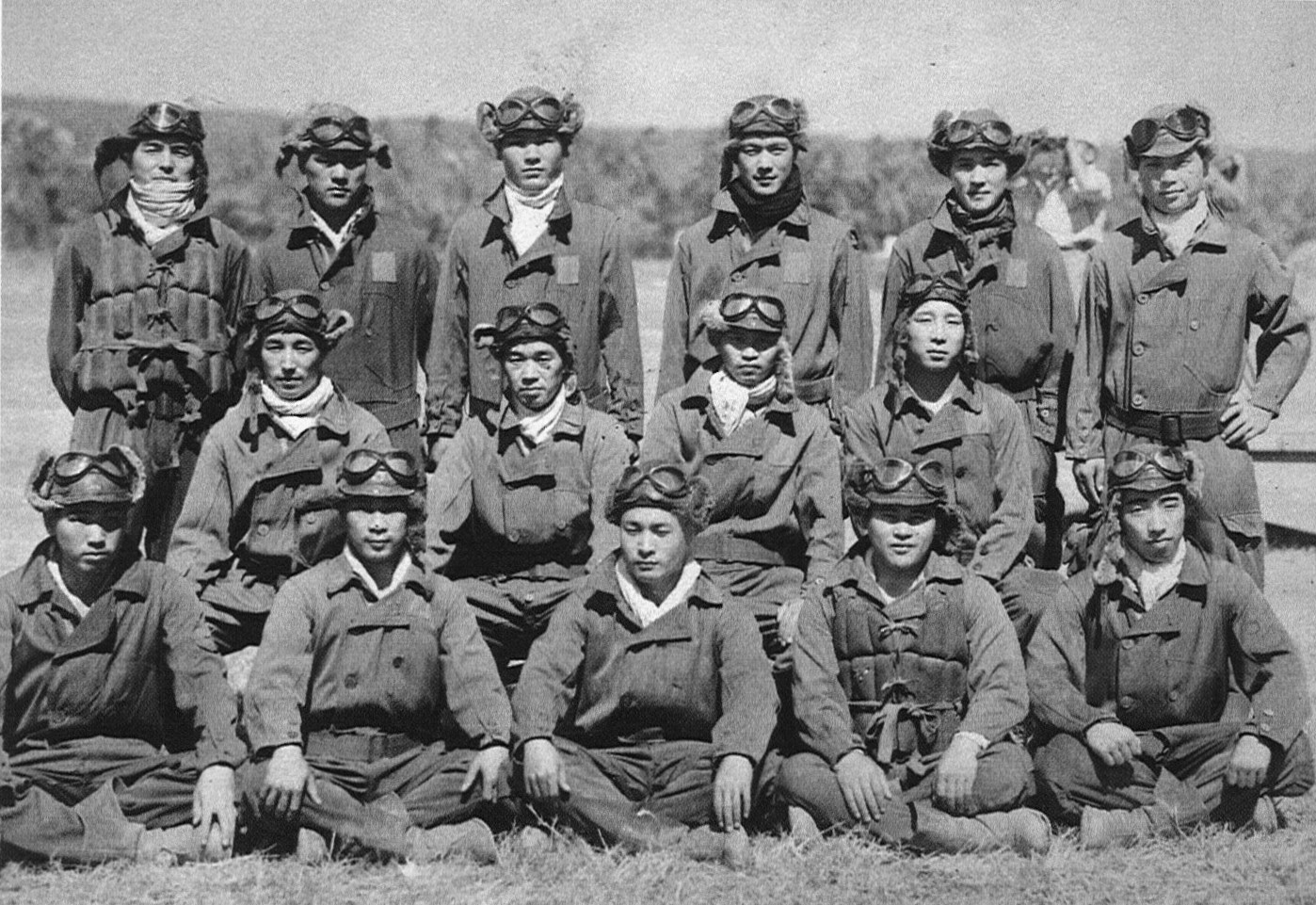
- Enlisted fighter pilots of the Tainan Air Group pose at Lae in June 1942. Several of these aviators would be among the top Japanese aces, including Saburō Sakai (middle row, second from left), and Hiroyoshi Nishizawa (standing, first on left).
- Active: October 1, 1941 – November 1, 1942
- Country: Empire of Japan
- Allegiance: Empire of Japan
- Branch: (Empire of Japan) Imperial Japanese Navy
- Type: Naval aviation unit
- Role: Air superiority Fighter aircraft support
- Size: 45-65 aircraft
- Part of: 25th Air Flotilla, 11th Air Fleet
- Garrison/HQ: Tainan, Taiwan; Legaspi, Philippines; Balikpapan, Borneo; Denpasar, Bali; Rabaul, New Britain; Lae, Papua New Guinea
- Aircraft flown: A6M Zero; A5M Claude
- Engagements: World War II: Battle of the Philippines (1941–42); Dutch East Indies campaign; New Guinea Campaign; Guadalcanal Campaign

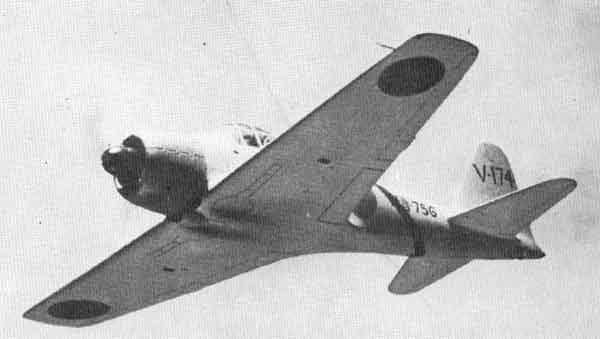
A Tainan Mitsubishi Zero A6M3 Type 32 fighter photographed at an unknown location.

The Tainan Air Group (台南海軍航空隊, Tainan Kaigun Kōkūtai) was a fighter aircraft and airbase garrison unit of the Imperial Japanese Navy (IJN) during the Pacific campaign of World War II. The flying portion of the unit was heavily involved in many of the major campaigns and battles of the first year of the war. The exploits of the unit were widely publicized in the Japanese media at the time, at least in part because the unit spawned more aces than any other fighter unit in the IJN. Several of the unit's aces were among the IJN's top scorers, and included Hiroyoshi Nishizawa, Saburō Sakai, Junichi Sasai, Watari Handa, Masaaki Shimakawa, and Toshio Ōta.

== History ==
=== Philippines and Dutch East Indies ===
The unit was formed at Tainan, Taiwan (then part of the Empire of Japan) on October 1, 1941 as part of the 23rd Air Flotilla. The unit's first commander was Captain Hiroshi Higuchi, who was relieved by Commander Masahisa Saito on 4 October 1941. Most of the unit's original pilots were veterans of aerial combat in the Second Sino-Japanese War. Just before the outbreak of war with the Allied powers, the unit consisted of 45 A6M Zero and 12 Type 96 fighter aircraft.

On 8 December 1941 forty-four Tainan aircraft escorted IJN bombers in attacks on US aircraft at Iba and Clark airfields on Luzon in the Philippines, a distance of 500 miles each way. The attacks almost completely destroyed General Douglas MacArthur's air forces. On 10 December Tainan Zeros shot down the B-17 bomber piloted by Colin Kelly. Later that month, the unit redeployed to the Philippines and continued to support Japanese forces as they overran and destroyed the territory's American and Filipino defenses.

The Tainan Naval Air Group then moved to Tarakan Island, followed by moves to Balikpapan and Denpasar, Bali to support the successful Japanese offensive into the Dutch East Indies beginning in January 1942. The unit's fighters helped inflict heavy losses on defending Allied aircraft in January and February 1942.

=== New Guinea ===
With the end of the campaign in March, the unit was integrated into the 25th Air Flotilla and redeployed to recently captured Rabaul, New Britain and Lae, Papua New Guinea in April. As of 25 April 1942, due to operational and combat losses, the Tainan Air Group, now under the command of Captain Masahisa Saitō, counted 26 Zero and 6 Type 96 "Claude" fighters.

The unit initially concentrated its aircraft at Lae to support an air campaign against the Australian and American forces stationed at Port Moresby. Between April and July, the Tainan Air Group flew 51 missions, totalling 602 sorties. During this time, the unit claimed to have destroyed 300 enemy aircraft. The Tainan's losses were 20 aircraft. Replacement aircraft gave the unit a total of 24 Zeros by August 1942, flown by 55 pilots. Because of the surplus in aircrew, only the most experienced pilots were allowed to fly combat missions.

=== Guadalcanal ===
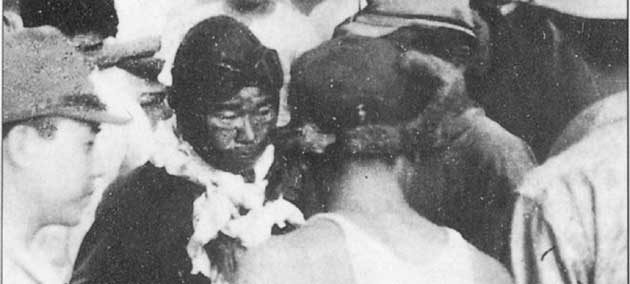
Saburō Sakai, seriously wounded by a bullet which creased his skull, arrives back at Rabaul on August 7.

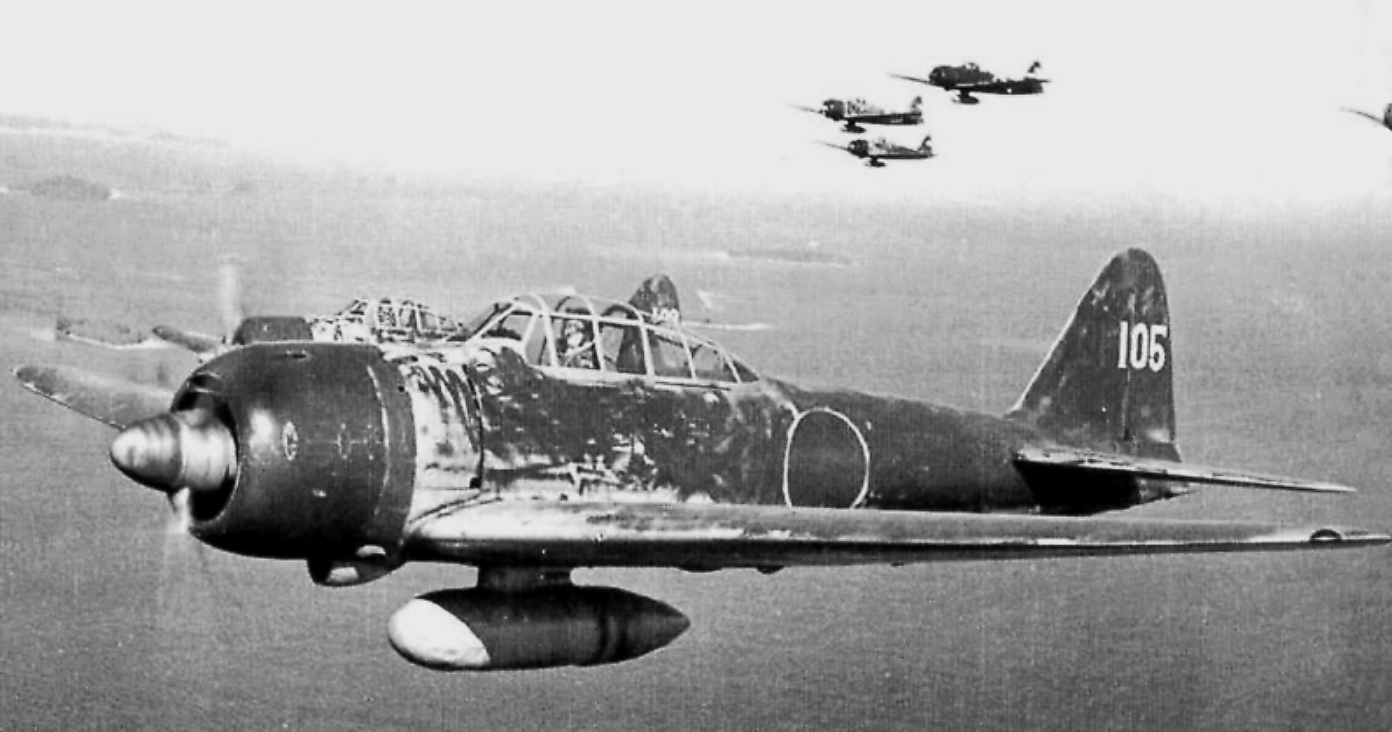
Aircraft of the 251 Air Group over the Solomon Islands, 1943

On August 7, United States Marines landed on Japanese-occupied Guadalcanal, initiating the Guadalcanal Campaign. In response that same day, 18 Tainan fighters escorted bombers from Rabaul for an attack on the Allied invasion fleet, the longest fighter mission of the war (556 miles each way) to that date. The Tainan claimed to have destroyed 43 enemy aircraft over Guadalcanal on that mission while losing two fighters with their pilots themselves. The Americans actually lost 10 aircraft, including nine of 18 fighters present, plus one dive bomber. The two Tainan pilots killed on this mission were Petty Officer First Class Yoshida and Petty Officer Second Class Nishiura.

One significant Tainan casualty over Guadalcanal that day was Saburō Sakai, who was seriously injured and forced into a two-year recuperation. The US Marines on August 8 captured an airfield (later called Henderson Field) under construction by the Japanese on Guadalcanal which was soon operational with Allied aircraft.

Over the next several months, Tainan aircraft based at Rabaul engaged in repeated dogfights with Allied aircraft, called the Cactus Air Force, based on Guadalcanal. The extreme distances required for the Tainan pilots to fly from Rabaul to Guadalcanal severely hampered the unit's attempts to establish air superiority over the island. The unit also continued to support bombing missions against Port Moresby. Between August and November 1942, the Tainan lost 32 pilots killed in action. Junichi Sasai was killed on August 26 and Toshio Ōta on October 21.

On November 1, 1942 the Japanese naval units in the Southeast Pacific were reorganized. The Tainan was redesignated as the 251 Air Group and reconstituted with replacement aircrews. The 20 surviving pilots of the Tainan were transferred to Japan to help form new fighter units. Bergerud says only 10 pilots were left and that the new unit was not called the "251st Air Group". Each digit in "251" refers to a discrete attribute of the new organization.

== Personnel Assigned ==
=== Commanding Officers ===
- Capt. Higuchi Hiroshi (40) - 1 October 1941 - 4 October 1941
- Cdr. / Capt. Saito Masahisa (47) - 4 October 1941 - 1 November 1942 (Promoted Captain on 1 May 1942.)

=== Executive Officers ===
- VACANT - 1 October 1941 - 1 November 1942

=== Maintenance Officers ===
- VACANT - 1 October 1941 - 15 October 1942
- Lt. (Eng.) Nishimoto Hisashi (Eng. 41) - 15 October 1942 - 1 November 1942

=== Surgeons ===
- LtCdr. (Med.) Fujimura Nobuyoshi (1929) - 1 October 1941 - 1 August 1942
- LtCdr. (Med.) Nishino Denkichi (1929) - 1 August 1942 - 1 November 1942

=== Paymasters ===
- Lt. (Pay.) Kaneko Seizaburo (Pay. Aux. 2) - 1 October 1941 - 1 November 1942

=== Communications Officers ===
- LtCdr. Sonoda Yoshiteru (56) - 1 October 1941 - 1 November 1942

=== Air Officers ===
- LtCdr. / Cdr. Kozono Yasuna (51) - 1 October 1941 - 1 November 1942 (Promoted Commander on 15 October 1941.)
