= Henry Sakaida =

American writer (1951–2018)

- Born: October 1951; Santa Monica
- Died: August 28, 2018 (aged 66); Los Angeles
- Occupation: Writer

Henry Sakaida (October 1951 – 28 August 2018) was an American writer who authored a number of books relating to World War II. He was a third-generation Japanese-American.

== Biography ==
Although born in Santa Monica, California in October 1951, he lived in Japan from the age of 3 to 5, before returning to the U.S. His father, a Japanese American, spent the duration of the war at the Manzanar Relocation Centre.

Sakaida attended Rosemead High School, and was in the class of 1970. He became interested in WWII aviation whilst at grammar school.

In 1971, Henry became acquainted with former Japanese Naval Pilot Saburō Sakai after they met at Miramar. He later published a book about Sakai's war history in 1985.

In 2018, he died at his home following a stroke, aged 66.

== Notable works ==
- Winged Samurai: Saburo Sakai and the Zero Fighter Pilots (1985)
- Pacific Air Combats WWII – Voices From The Past (1993)
- Siege of Rabaul (1996)
- Imperial Japanese Navy Aces (1997)
- Japanese Army Air Force Aces (1997)
- B-29 Hunters of the JAAF (with Koji Takaki)(2001)
- Aces of the Rising Sun 1937–1945 (2002)
- Genda's Blade: Japan's Squadron of Aces: 343 Kokutai (2003)
- Heroines of the Soviet Union 1941–45 (2003)
- Heroes of the Soviet Union 1941–45 (2004)
- I-400: Japan's Secret Aircraft Carrying Strike Submarine, Objective Panama Canal (with Koji Takaki and Gary Nila)(2010)
- Nomonhan 1939: The bloody Soviet-Japanese border war (2012)
- Lyndon Johnson's 1943 Silver Star medal revelations
