= VF-83 =

Fighter Squadron 83
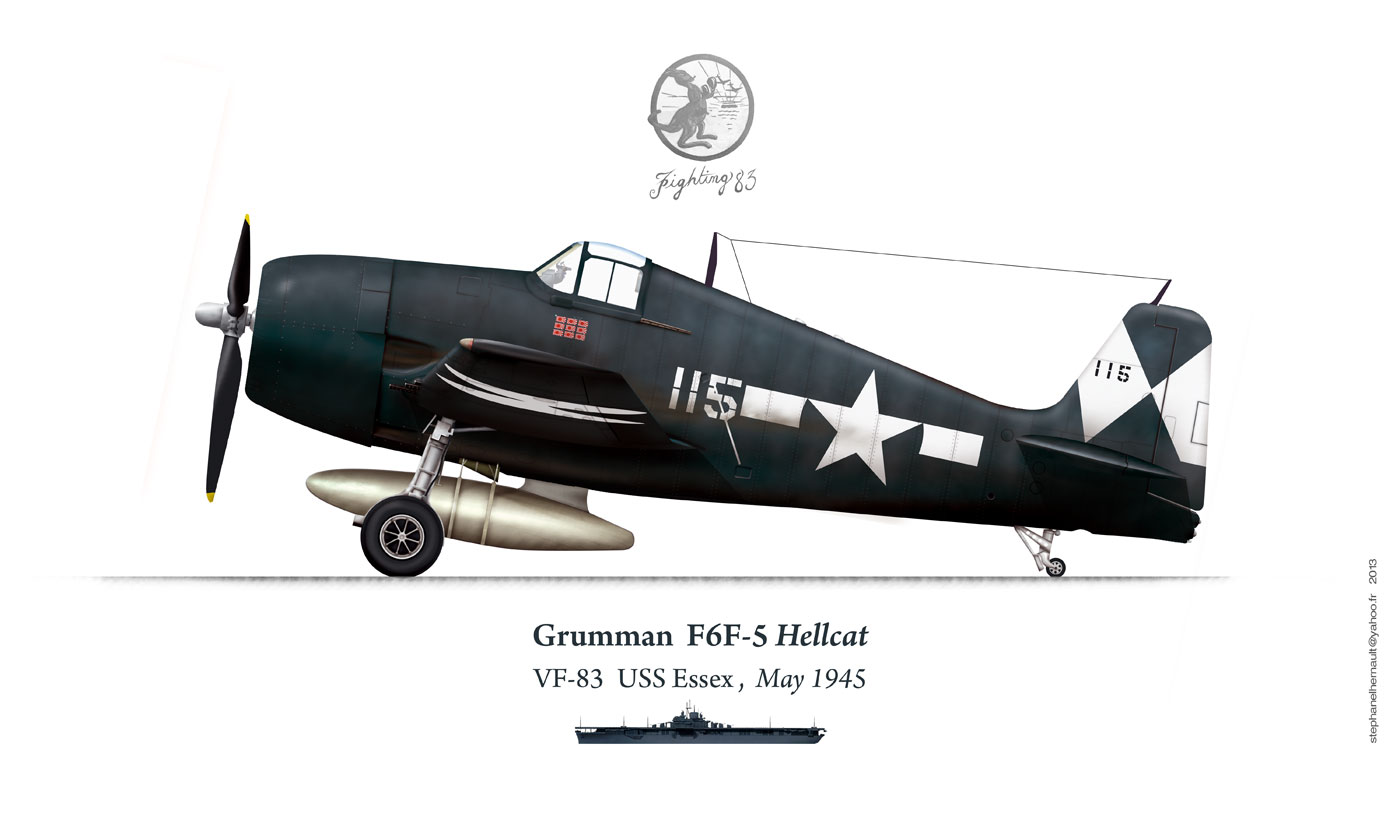
- Diagram of VF-83 F6F-5 Hellcat
- Active: 1 May 1944 – 24 September 1945
- Country: United States
- Branch: United States Navy
- Type: Fighter
- Engagements: World War II

Aircraft flown
- Fighter: F6F-5 Hellcat

Fighter Squadron 83 or VF-83 was an aviation unit of the United States Navy. Originally established on 1 May 1944, it was disestablished on 24 September 1945. It was the first US Navy squadron to be designated as VF-83.

== Operational history ==
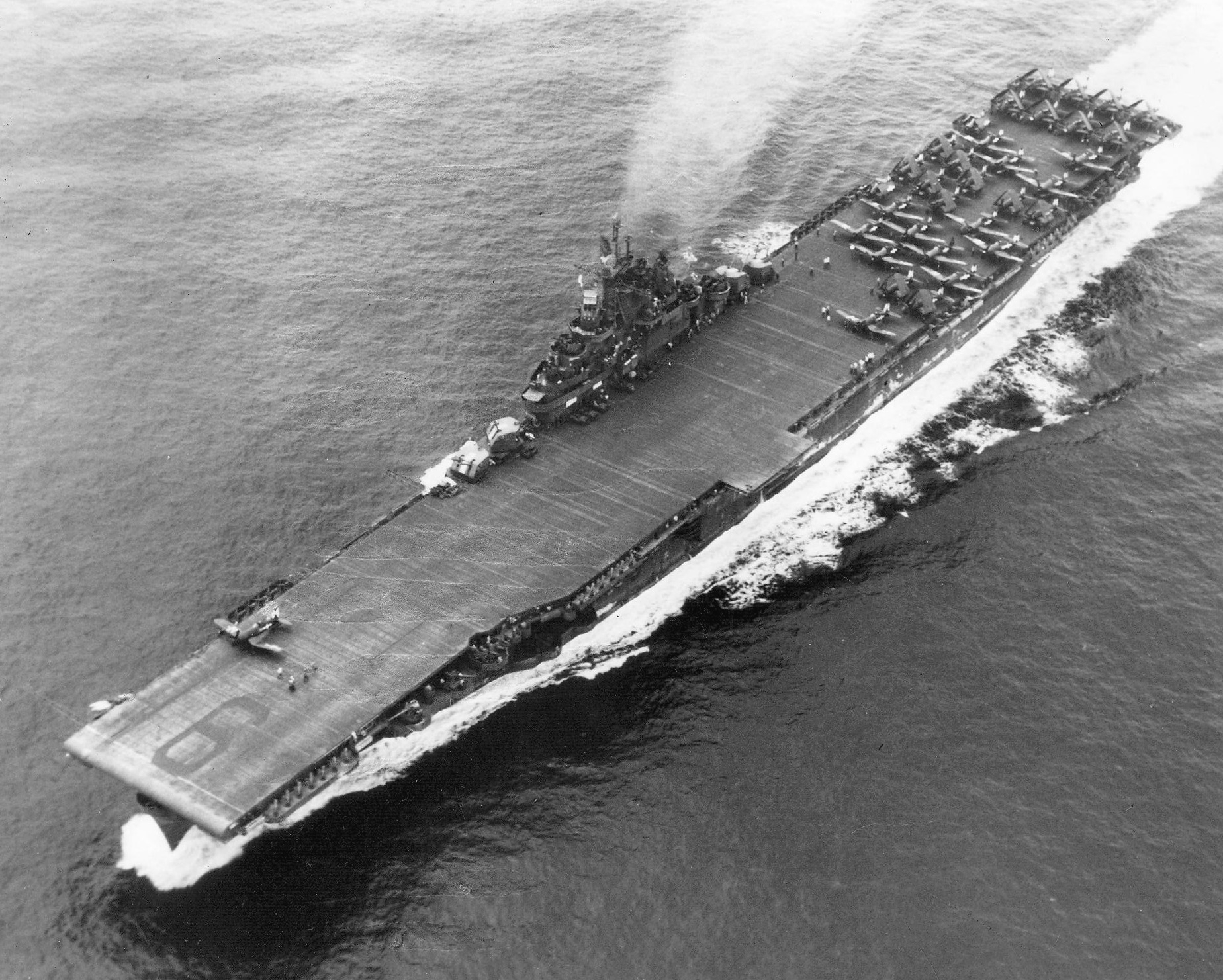
VF-83 F6F-5s on USS Essex, 20 May 1945

VF-83 formed part of Carrier Air Group 83 (CVG-83) assigned to the USS Essex. CVG-83 was in action in the Pacific theatre from 10 March to 15 September 1945 participating in raids on Kyushu, supporting the invasion of Okinawa, the discovery and sinking of the Japanese battleship Yamato and other air strikes against the Japanese home islands.

== See also ==
- History of the United States Navy
- List of inactive United States Navy aircraft squadrons
- List of United States Navy aircraft squadrons
