= Saburō Sakai =

Imperial Japanese Navy WWII fighter pilot (1916–2000)

- 坂井 三郎
- Born: 25 August 1916; Saga, Japan
- Died: 22 September 2000 (aged 84); Atsugi Naval Air Station, Japan
- Spouses: Hatsuyo (m. 1944; died 1947); Haru (m. 1952)
- Children: 3
- Military career
- Allegiance: Empire of Japan
- Branch: Imperial Japanese Navy Air Service (IJN)
- Service years: 1933–1945
- Rank: Lieutenant Junior Grade
- Nickname: Sky Samurai
- Units: Tainan Naval Air Wing; Yokosuka Naval Air Wing; 343rd Naval Air Group
- Conflicts: Second Sino-Japanese War; Battle of Wuhan; Battle of Chongqing-Chengdu; World War II; Pacific War; Philippines campaign; Dutch East Indies campaign; New Guinea campaign; Solomon Islands campaign (WIA)

Saburō Sakai (坂井 三郎, Sakai Saburō; 25 August 1916 – 22 September 2000) was a Japanese naval aviator and flying ace ("Gekitsui-O", 撃墜王) of the Imperial Japanese Navy during World War II. Sakai had 28 aerial victories, including shared ones, according to official Japanese records, though he and his ghostwriter Martin Caidin claimed much higher numbers.

== Early life ==
Saburō Sakai was born on 25 August 1916 in Saga Prefecture, Japan. He was born into a family with an immediate affiliation to the samurai and their warrior legacies. Their ancestors were themselves samurai and had taken part in the Japanese invasions of Korea (1592–1598) but were later forced to take up a livelihood of farming after haihan-chiken in 1871. He was the third-born of four sons (his given name literally means "third son") and had three sisters. Sakai was 11 when his father died, which left his mother alone to raise seven children. With limited resources, Sakai was adopted by his maternal uncle, who financed his education in a Tokyo high school. However, Sakai failed to do well in his studies and was sent back to Saga after his second year.

On 31 May 1933, at the age of 16, Sakai enlisted in the Imperial Japanese Navy as a Sailor Fourth Class (Seaman Recruit) (四等水兵) at the Sasebo Naval Base. Sakai described his experiences as a naval recruit:

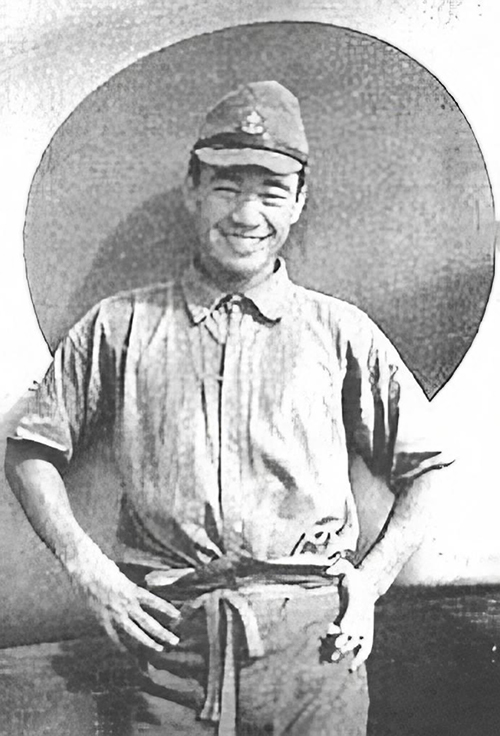
Sakai posing in front of the hinomaru on his Mitsubishi A5M Type 96 fighter (Wuhan, 1939).

The petty officers would not hesitate to administer the severest beatings to recruits they felt deserving of punishment. Whenever I committed a breach of discipline or an error in training, I was dragged physically from my cot by a petty officer. 'Stand tall to the wall! Bend down, Recruit Sakai!' he would roar. 'I am not doing this because I hate you, but because I like you and want you to make a good seaman. Bend down!' And with that he would swing a large stick of wood and with every ounce of strength he possessed would slam it against my upturned bottom. The pain was terrible, the force of the blows unremitting.

There was no choice but to grit my teeth and struggle desperately not to cry out. At times I counted up to forty crashing impacts into my buttocks. Often I fainted from the pain. A lapse into unconsciousness constituted no escape however. The petty officer simply hurled a bucket of cold water over my prostrate form and bellowed for me to resume position, whereupon he continued his 'discipline' until satisfied I would mend the error of my ways.

After completing his training the following year, Sakai graduated as a Sailor Third Class (Ordinary Seaman) (三等水兵). He then served aboard the battleship Kirishima for one year. In 1935, he successfully passed the competitive examinations for the Naval Gunners' School. Sakai was promoted to Sailor Second Class (Able Seaman) (二等水兵) in 1936, and served on the battleship Haruna as a turret gunner. He received successive promotions to Sailor First Class (Leading Seaman) (一等水兵) and to Petty Officer Third Class (三等兵曹). In early 1937, he applied for and was accepted into the navy pilot training program. He graduated first in his class at Tsuchiura in 1937 and earned a silver watch, which was presented to him by Emperor Hirohito. Sakai graduated as a carrier pilot although he was never assigned to aircraft-carrier duty. One of Sakai's classmates was Jūzō Mori, who graduated as a carrier pilot and served on the Japanese aircraft carrier Sōryū by flying Nakajima B5N torpedo bombers early in the war.

Promoted to Petty Officer Second Class (二等兵曹) in 1938, Sakai took part in aerial combat flying the Mitsubishi A5M at the beginning of the Second Sino-Japanese War in 1938–1939 and was wounded in action. Later, he was selected to fly the Mitsubishi A6M2 Zero fighter in combat over China.

== World War II ==
=== Southeast Asia ===
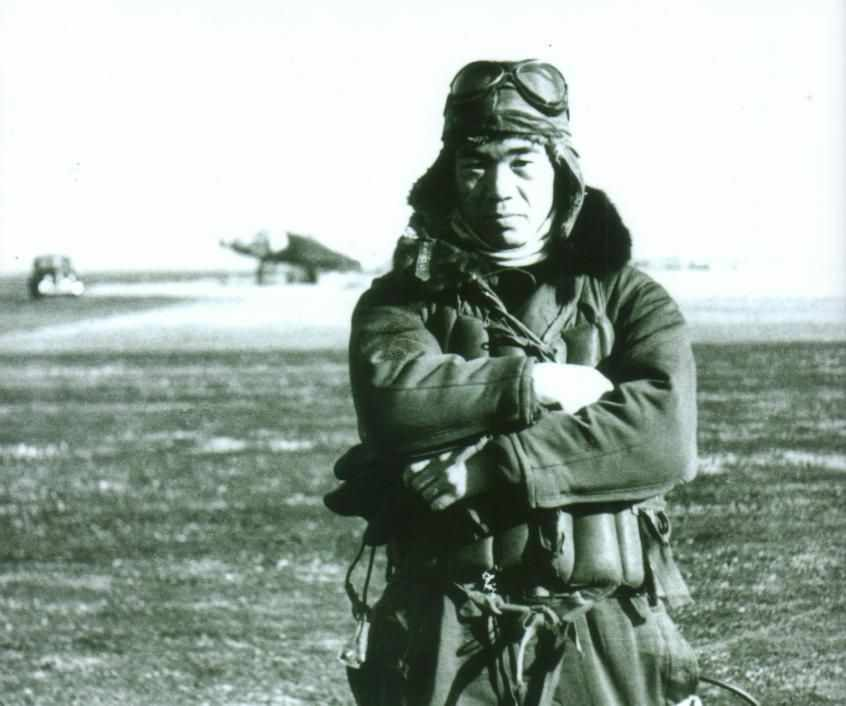
Saburō Sakai as a petty officer wearing a life jacket

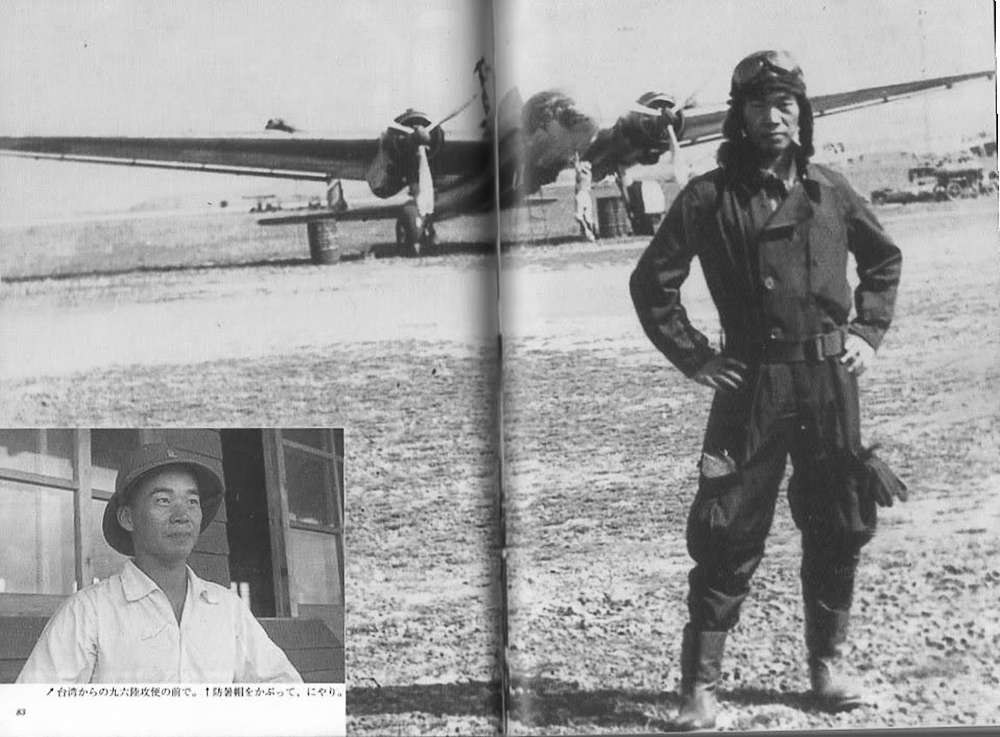
Saburō Sakai posing in front of a bomber aircraft

When Japan attacked the Western Allies in 1941, Sakai participated in the attack on the Philippines as a member of the Tainan Air Group. On 8 December 1941, Sakai flew one of 45 Zeros from the Tainan Kōkūtai (a Kōkūtai was an Air Group) that attacked Clark Air Base in the Philippines. In his first combat against Americans, he shot down a Curtiss P-40 Warhawk and destroyed two B-17 Flying Fortresses by strafing them on the ground. Sakai flew missions the next day during heavy weather.

On the third day of the battle, Sakai claimed to have shot down a B-17, flown by Captain Colin P. Kelly. Sakai, who has often been credited with the victory, was a Shotai leader engaged in this fight with the bomber although he and his two wingmen do not appear to have been given official credit for it.

Early in 1942, Sakai was transferred to Tarakan Island in Borneo and fought in the Dutch East Indies. The Japanese high command instructed fighter patrols to down all enemy aircraft that were encountered, whether they were armed or not. On a patrol with his Zero over Java, just after he had shot down an enemy aircraft, Sakai encountered a civilian Dutch Douglas DC-3 flying at low altitude over dense jungle. Sakai initially assumed that it was transporting important people and signaled to its pilot to follow him, but the pilot did not obey. Sakai descended and approached the DC-3. He then saw a blonde woman and a young child through a window, along with other passengers. The woman reminded him of Mrs. Martin, an American who occasionally had taught him as a child in middle school and had been kind to him. He ignored his orders, flew ahead of the pilot, and signaled him to go ahead. The pilot and the passengers saluted him. Sakai did not mention the encounter in the aerial combat report.

During the Borneo Campaign, Sakai achieved 13 more victories before he was grounded by illness. When he recovered three months later in April, Petty Officer First Class Sakai joined a squadron (chutai) of the Tainan Kōkūtai under Sub-Lieutenant Junichi Sasai at Lae, New Guinea. Over the next four months, he scored the majority of his victories in flying against American and Australian pilots based at Port Moresby.

A myth has been perpetuated over time but declared to be product of the imagination of Martin Caidin, the co-author of Sakai's book "Samurai." Supposedly, on the night of 16 May, Sakai and his colleagues, Hiroyoshi Nishizawa and Toshio Ota, were listening to a broadcast of an Australian radio program, and Nishizawa recognized the eerie "Danse Macabre" of Camille Saint-Saëns. Inspired, Nishizawa is said to have come up with the idea of doing demonstration loops over the enemy airfield. The next day, his squadron included fellow aces Hiroyoshi Nishizawa and Toshio Ōta. At the end of an attack on Port Moresby, which had involved 18 Zeros, the trio performed three tight loops in close formation over the allied air base. Nishizawa indicated that he wanted to repeat the performance. Diving to 6,000 ft (1,800 m), the three Zeros did three more loops without receiving any AA fire from the ground. The following day, a lone Allied bomber flew over the Lae airfield and dropped a note attached to a long cloth ribbon. A soldier picked up the note and delivered to the squadron commander. It read (paraphrased): "Thank you for the wonderful display of aerobatics by three of your pilots. Please pass on our regards and inform them that we will have a warm reception ready for them, next time they fly over our airfield." The squadron commander was furious and reprimanded the three pilots for their stupidity, but the Tainan Kōkūtai's three leading aces felt that Nishizawa's aerial choreography of the Danse Macabre had been worth it.

=== Pacific Theater ===
On 3 August 1942, Sakai's air group was relocated from Lae to the airfield at Rabaul.

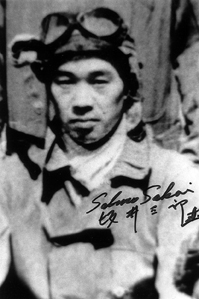
Sakai in flightsuit

On 7 August, word arrived that US Marines had landed that morning on Guadalcanal. The initial Allied landings captured an airfield, later named Henderson Field by the Allies, that had been under construction by the Japanese. The airfield soon became the focus of months of fighting during the Guadalcanal campaign, as it enabled US airpower to hinder the Japanese in their attempts at resupplying their troops. The Japanese made several attempts to retake Henderson Field that resulted in almost daily air battles for the Tainan Kōkūtai.

US Marines flying Grumman F4F Wildcats from Henderson Field on Guadalcanal were using a new aerial combat tactic, the "Thach Weave", which was developed in 1941 by the US Navy aviators John Thach and Edward O'Hare. The Japanese Zero pilots flying out of Rabaul were initially confounded by the tactic. Sakai described the reaction to the Thach Weave when they encountered Guadalcanal Wildcats using it:

For the first time Lt. Commander Tadashi Nakajima encountered what was to become a famous double-team maneuver on the part of the enemy. Two Wildcats jumped on the commander's plane. He had no trouble in getting on the tail of an enemy fighter, but never had a chance to fire before the Grumman's team-mate roared at him from the side. Nakajima was raging when he got back to Rabaul; he had been forced to dive and run for safety.

On 7 August, Sakai and three pilots shot down an F4F Wildcat flown by Lieutenant James "Pug" Southerland of Fighting Squadron Five (VF-5), who by the end of the war became an ace with five victories. Sakai, who did not know that Southerland's guns had jammed, recalled the duel in his autobiography:

In desperation, I snapped out a burst. At once the Grumman snapped away in a roll to the right, clawed around in a tight turn, and ended up in a climb straight at my own plane. Never before had I seen an enemy plane move so quickly or gracefully before, and every second his guns were moving closer to the belly of my fighter. I snap-rolled in an effort to throw him off. He would not be shaken. He was using my favorite tactics, coming up from under.

They were soon engaged in a skillfully-maneuvered dogfight. After an extended battle in which both pilots gained and lost the upper hand, Sakai fatally damaged Southerland's Wildcat, striking it below the left wing root with his Zero's 20 mm cannon. Southerland parachuted to safety.

Sakai was amazed at the Wildcat's ruggedness:

I had full confidence in my ability to destroy the Grumman and decided to finish off the enemy fighter with only my 7.7 mm machine guns. I turned the 20 mm cannon switch to the 'off' position and closed in. For some strange reason, even after I had poured about five or six hundred rounds of ammunition directly into the Grumman, the airplane did not fall, but kept on flying. I thought this very odd — it had never happened before — and closed the distance between the two airplanes until I could almost reach out and touch the Grumman. To my surprise, the Grumman's rudder and tail were torn to shreds, looking like an old torn piece of rag. With his plane in such condition, no wonder the pilot was unable to continue fighting! A Zero which had taken that many bullets would have been a ball of fire by now.

Not long after he had downed Southerland, Sakai was attacked by a lone Douglas SBD Dauntless dive bomber flown by Lieutenant Dudley Adams of USS Wasp's Scouting Squadron 71 (VS-71). Adams sent a bullet through Sakai's canopy, narrowly missing the ace's head, but Sakai quickly gained the upper hand and succeeded in downing Adams. Although Adams bailed out and survived, his gunner, RM3/c Harry Elliot, was killed in the encounter. According to Sakai, that was his 60th victory.

=== Serious wounds ===
Shortly after he had shot down Southerland and Adams, Sakai spotted a flight of eight aircraft orbiting near Tulagi. Believing it to be another group of Wildcats, Sakai approached them from below and behind, aiming to catch them by surprise. However, he soon realised that he had made a mistake - the planes were in fact carrier-based bombers with rear-mounted machine guns. Despite that realisation, he had progressed too far into the attack to back off, and had no choice but to see it through.

The account given in Samurai! identifies the aircraft as Grumman TBF Avengers, stating that Sakai could clearly see the enclosed top turret. Sakai claimed to have shot down two of the Avengers (his 61st and 62nd victories) before return fire had struck his plane. The kills were seemingly verified by the three Zero pilots following Sakai, but no Avengers were reported lost that day.

However, according to US Navy records, only one formation of bombers reported fighting Zeros under these circumstances. This was a group of eight SBD Dauntlesses from Enterprise, led by Lieutenant Carl Horenberger of Bombing Squadron 6 (VB-6). The SBD crews reported being attacked by two Zeros, one of which came in from directly astern and flew into the concentrated fire from their twin .30 caliber machine guns. The rear gunners claimed the Zero as a kill when it dove away in distress, in return for two planes damaged (one seriously).

Whatever the case, Sakai sustained serious wounds from the bombers' return fire. He was hit in the head by a .30 caliber bullet, which injured his skull and temporarily paralyzed the left side of his body. The wound is described elsewhere as having destroyed the metal frame of his goggles and "creased" his skull, a glancing blow that broke the skin and made a furrow, or even cracked the skull but did not actually penetrate it. Shattered glass from the canopy temporarily blinded him in his right eye and reduced vision in his left eye severely. The Zero rolled inverted and descended towards the sea. Unable to see out of his left eye because of the glass and the blood from his serious head wound, Sakai's vision started to clear somewhat as tears cleared the blood from his eyes, and he pulled his plane out of the dive. He considered ramming an American warship: "If I must die, at least I could go out as a samurai. My death would take several of the enemy with me. A ship. I needed a ship." Finally, the cold air blasting into the cockpit revived him enough to check his instruments, and he decided that by leaning the fuel mixture, he might be able to return to the airfield at Rabaul.

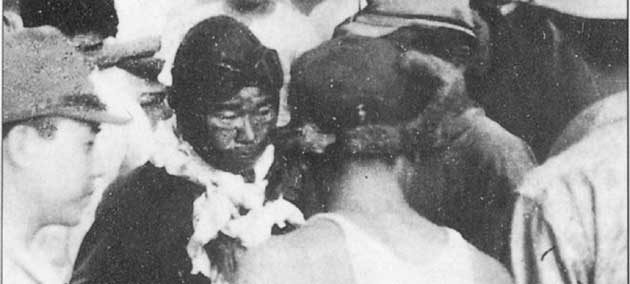
Rabaul, 8 August 1942: A seriously-wounded Sakai returns to Rabaul with his damaged Zero after a 4 h 47 min flight over 560 nmi (1,040 km; 640 mi). Sakai's skull was creased by a machine-gun bullet, he was blind in one eye, and his face was swollen and burned by exposure to the wind through his shattered canopy. Sakai walks towards the flight operations building as he insisted on making his mission report before accepting medical treatment.

Although in agony from his injuries Sakai managed to fly his damaged Zero in a 4 h 47 min flight over 560 nmi (1,040 km; 640 mi) back to his base on Rabaul by using familiar volcanic peaks as guides. When he attempted to land at the airfield, he nearly crashed into a line of parked Zeros, but after circling four times and with the fuel gauge reading empty, he put his Zero down on the runway on his second attempt. After landing, he insisted on making his mission report to his superior officer and then collapsed. Nishizawa drove him to a surgeon. Sakai was evacuated to Japan on 12 August and there endured a long surgery without anesthesia. The surgery repaired some of the damage to his head but was unable to restore full vision to his right eye. Nishizawa visited Sakai, who was recuperating in the hospital in Yokosuka.

=== Recovery and return ===
After his discharge from the hospital in January 1943, Sakai spent a year in training new fighter pilots. He found the new generation of student pilots, who typically outranked veteran instructors, to be arrogant and unskilled. With Japan clearly losing the air war, he prevailed upon his superiors to let him fly in combat again. In November 1943, Sakai was promoted to the rank of flying warrant officer (飛行兵曹長). In April 1944, he was transferred to Yokosuka Air Wing, which was posted to Iwo Jima.

On 24 June 1944, Sakai approached a formation of 15 US Navy Grumman F6F Hellcat fighters, which he had mistakenly assumed to be friendly Japanese aircraft. William A. McCormick saw four Hellcats on the Zero's tail but decided not to get involved. Despite facing superior enemy aircraft, Sakai demonstrated his skill and experience by eluding the attacks and returning to his airfield unscathed.

Sakai claimed to have never lost a wingman in combat, but he lost at least two of them over Iwo Jima.

Sakai said that he had been ordered to lead a kamikaze mission on 5 July but that he failed to find the US task force. He was engaged by Hellcat fighters near the task force's reported position, and all but one of the Nakajima B6N2 "Jill" torpedo bombers in his flight were shot down. Sakai managed to shoot down one Hellcat and escaped the umbrella of enemy aircraft by flying into a cloud. Rather than follow meaningless orders in worsening weather and gathering darkness, Sakai led his small formation back to Iwo Jima. However, according to the aerial combat report, his mission was to escort bombers to and from their targets, and in the afternoon of 24 June, Sakai joined the attack on the US task force.

In August 1944, Sakai was commissioned an ensign (少尉). He was transferred to 343rd Air Group and returned to the Yokosuka Air Wing again.

About the same time, Sakai married his cousin Hatsuyo, who asked him for a dagger so that she could kill herself if he fell in battle. His autobiography, Samurai!, ends with Hatsuyo throwing away the dagger after Japan's surrender and saying that she no longer needed it.

Saburō Sakai participated in the IJNAS's last wartime mission by attacking two reconnaissance Consolidated B-32 Dominators on 18 August, which were conducting photo-reconnaissance and testing Japanese compliance with the ceasefire. He initially misidentified the planes as Boeing B-29 Superfortresses. Both aircraft returned to their base at Yontan Airfield, Okinawa, but the action resulted in the death of Sergeant Anthony J. Marchione, the last American combat casualty of the war. His encounter with the B-32 Dominators in the IJNAS's final mission was not included in Samurai!.

Sakai was promoted to sub-lieutenant (中尉) after the war had ended.

== Post-war civilian life ==
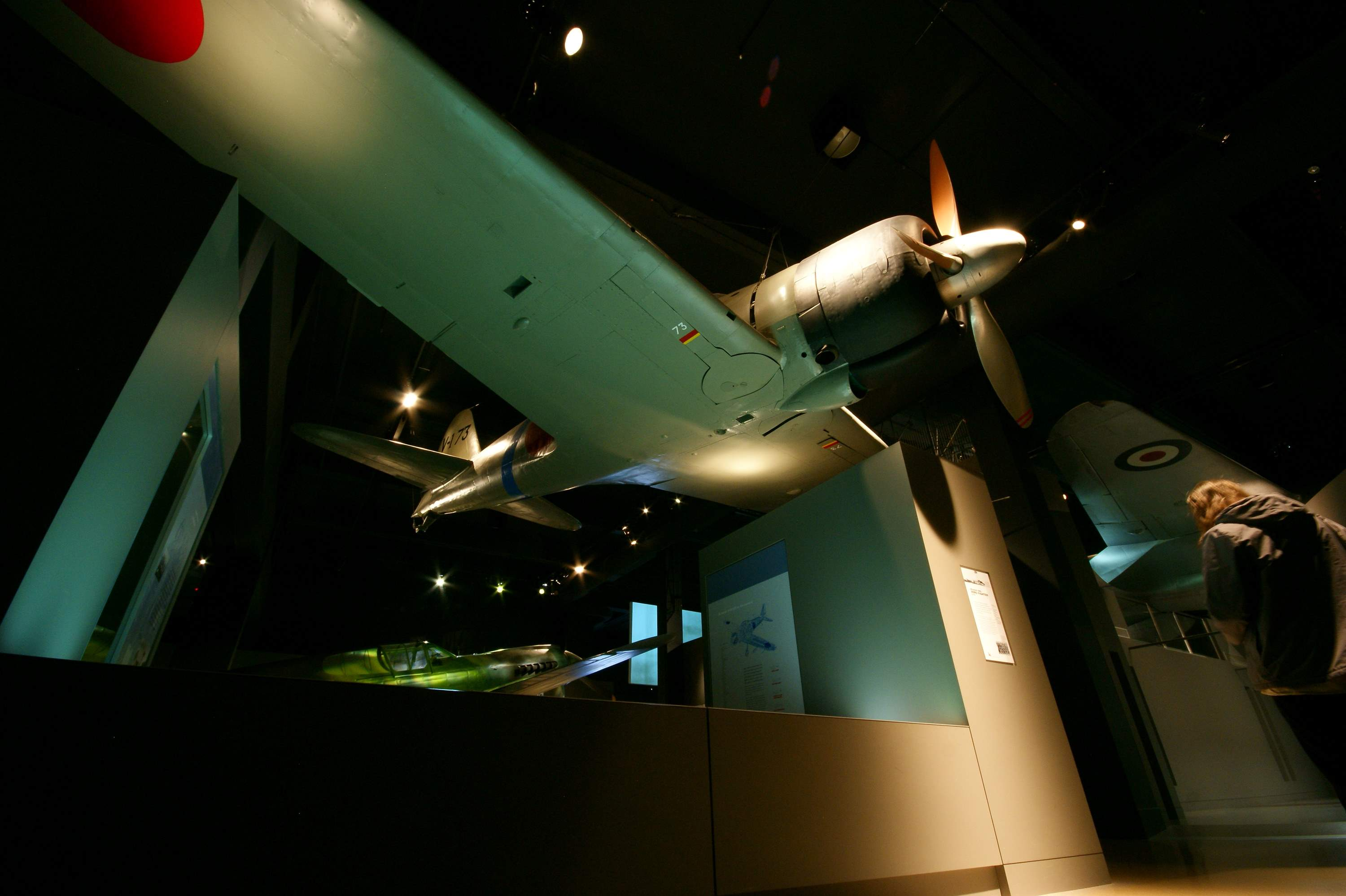
Sakai's A6M2 Zero, tail code V-173, preserved at the Australian War Memorial in Canberra

After the war, Sakai retired from the Navy. He became a Buddhist acolyte and vowed never again to kill anything that lived, even a mosquito.

Likewise, although Japan had been defeated in the Second World War with great loss of life, Sakai serenely accepted that outcome: "Had I been ordered to bomb Seattle or Los Angeles in order to end the war, I wouldn't have hesitated. So I perfectly understand why the Americans bombed Nagasaki and Hiroshima."

Times were difficult for Sakai. He had trouble finding a job, and Hatsuyo died in 1947. He remarried in 1952 and started a printing shop.

Sakai sent his daughter to college in the United States "to learn English and democracy."

Sakai visited the US and met many of his former adversaries, including Lieutenant Commander Harold Llewellyn "Lew" Jones (1921–2009), one of the SBD Dauntless rear-seat gunners (flying in Ensign Robert C. Shaw's plane) who had wounded him on August 7, 1942.

After a US Navy formal dinner in 2000 at Atsugi Naval Air Station at which he had been an honored guest, Sakai died of a heart attack at the age of 84.

He was survived by his second wife, Haru, two daughters and a son.

== In popular culture ==
=== Books ===
Claims have been made that his autobiography Samurai! includes fictional stories, and that the number of kills specified in that work were increased to promote sales of the book by Martin Caidin. The book was not published in Japan and differs from his biographies there.

Winged Samurai: Saburo Sakai and the Zero Fighter Pilots is a 1985 book by Henry Sakaida dealing with the wartime history of Saburō Sakai.

=== Film ===
The 1976 movie Zero Pilot dramatized Saburō Sakai’s experiences as a WWII fighter pilot. In it, Sakai is portrayed by the actor Hiroshi Fujioka. The screenplay is based on Sakai's book Samurai!.

==== Video games ====
In the year 2000, just before he died, Sakai (along with American Marine Corps fighter ace Joe Foss) served as a consultant for the development of Microsoft Combat Flight Simulator 2.
