= Japanese aircraft carrier Kaga =

Aircraft carrier of the Imperial Japanese Navy

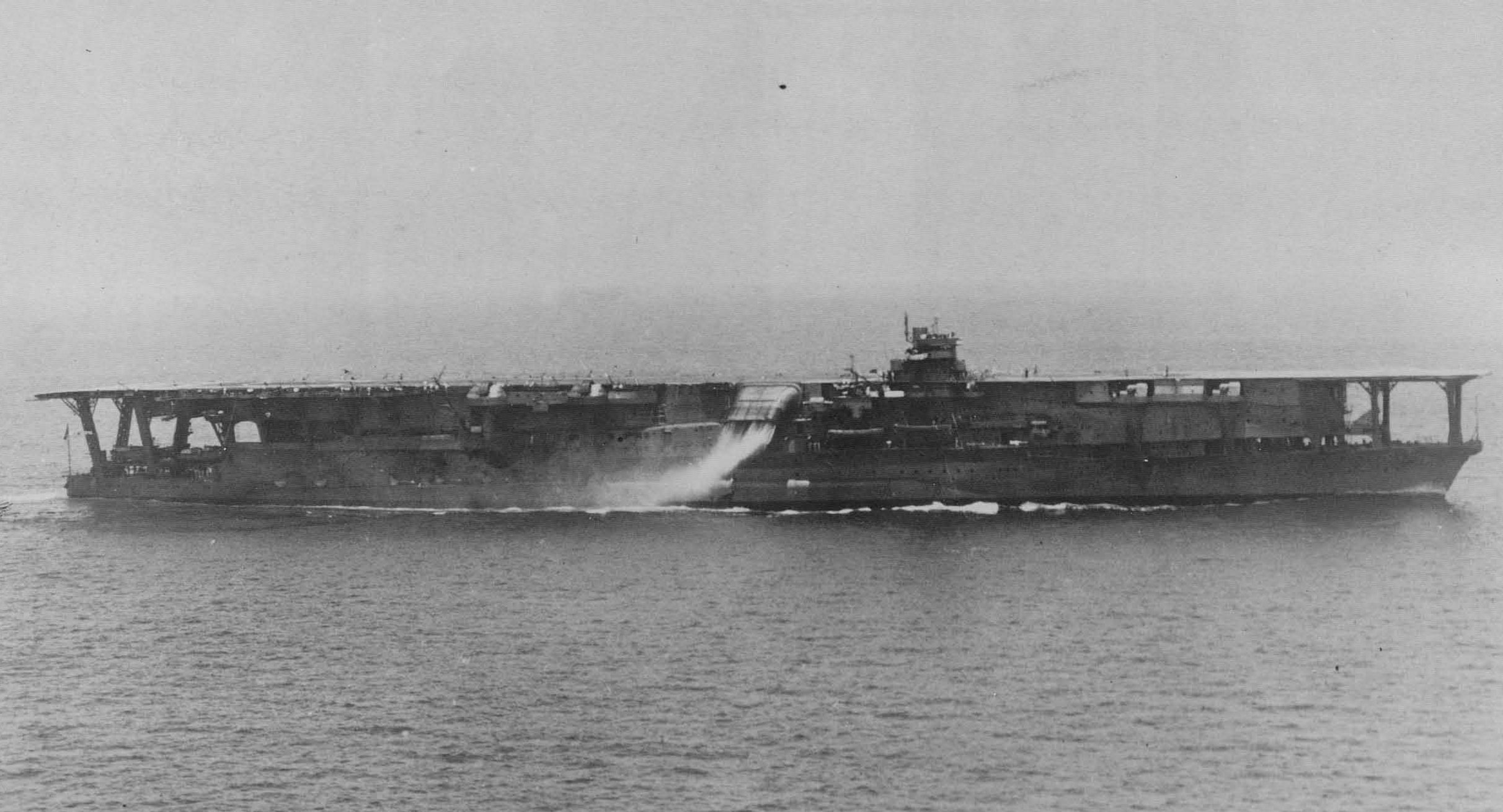
- Kaga after her modernization, with her distinctive downward-facing funnel

Class overview
- Operators: Imperial Japanese Navy
- Preceded by: Akagi
- Succeeded by: Ryūjō
- Built: 1920–1928
- In service: 1928–1942
- In commission: 1928–1942
- Completed: 1
- Lost: 1

History

Japan
- Name: Kaga
- Namesake: Kaga Province
- Builder: Kawasaki and Yokosuka Naval Arsenal
- Cost: ¥53 million ($36.45 million)
- Laid down: 19 July 1920
- Launched: 17 November 1921
- Completed: 31 March 1928
- Commissioned: 30 November 1929
- Reclassified: 21 November 1923 as an aircraft carrier
- Refit: 20 October 1933 – 25 June 1935
- Stricken: 10 August 1942
- Fate: Sunk by dive bombers from the USS Enterprise during the Battle of Midway, 4 June 1942

General characteristics (after 1935 modernization)
- Type: Aircraft carrier
- Displacement: 38,200 long tons (38,813 t) (standard)
- Length: 247.65 m (812 ft 6 in)
- Beam: 32.5 m (106 ft 8 in)
- Draft: 9.48 m (31 ft 1 in)
- Installed power: 8 Kampon water-tube boilers; 127,400 shp (95,000 kW)
- Propulsion: 4 shafts; 4 geared steam turbines
- Speed: 28 knots (52 km/h; 32 mph)
- Endurance: 10,000 nmi (19,000 km; 12,000 mi) at 15 knots (28 km/h; 17 mph)
- Complement: 1,708 (after reconstruction)
- Armament: 10 × single 200 mm (7.9 in) guns; 8 × twin 127 mm (5 in) DP guns; 11 × twin Type 96 25 mm (1 in) AA guns
- Armor: Belt: 152 mm (6 in); Deck: 38 mm (1.5 in)
- Aircraft carried: 90 (total); 72 (+ 18 in storage) (1936); 21 Mitsubishi A6M Zero, 27 Aichi D3A, 27 Nakajima B5N (7 Dec 1941)

Kaga (Japanese: 加賀; named after the ancient Kaga Province) was an aircraft carrier built for the Imperial Japanese Navy (IJN). Originally intended to be one of two Tosa-class battleships, Kaga was converted under the terms of the Washington Naval Treaty to an aircraft carrier as the replacement for the battlecruiser Amagi, which had been irreparably damaged during the 1923 Great Kantō earthquake. Kaga was rebuilt in 1933–1935, increasing her top speed, improving her exhaust systems, and adapting her flight decks to accommodate more modern, heavier aircraft.

The ship figured prominently in the development of the IJN's carrier striking force doctrine, which grouped carriers together to give greater mass and concentration to their air power. A revolutionary strategic concept at the time, the employment of the doctrine was crucial in enabling Japan to attain its initial strategic goals during the first six months of the Pacific War.

Kaga's aircraft first supported Japanese troops in China during the Shanghai Incident of 1932 and participated in the Second Sino-Japanese War in the late 1930s. With other carriers, she took part in the attack on Pearl Harbor in December 1941 and the invasion of Rabaul in the Southwest Pacific in January 1942. The following month her aircraft participated in a combined carrier airstrike on Darwin, Australia, and helping secure the conquest of the Dutch East Indies by Japanese forces. She missed the Indian Ocean raid in April as she had to return to Japan for repairs after hitting a reef in February.

Following repairs, Kaga rejoined the 1st Air Fleet for the Battle of Midway in June 1942. After bombarding American forces on Midway Atoll, Kaga and three other IJN carriers were attacked by American aircraft from Midway and the carriers Enterprise, Hornet, and Yorktown. Dive bombers from Enterprise severely damaged Kaga; when it became obvious she could not be saved, she was scuttled by Japanese destroyers to prevent her from falling into enemy hands. The loss of Kaga and three other IJN carriers at Midway was a crucial setback for Japan, and contributed significantly to Japan's ultimate defeat. In 1999, debris from Kaga including a large section of her hull was located on the ocean floor northwest of Midway Island. In 2019, RV Petrel discovered her wreck on the ocean floor.

== Design and construction ==
Kaga was laid down as a Tosa-class battleship, and was launched on 17 November 1921 at the Kawasaki Heavy Industries shipyard in Kobe. On 5 February 1922 both Tosa-class ships were canceled and scheduled to be scrapped under the terms of the Washington Naval Treaty.

The Treaty authorized conversion of two battleship or battlecruiser hulls into aircraft carriers of up to 33,000 long tons (34,000 t) standard displacement. The incomplete battlecruisers Amagi and Akagi were initially selected, but the Great Kantō earthquake of 1923 damaged Amagi's hull beyond economically feasible repair, and Kaga was selected as her replacement. The formal decision to convert Kaga to an aircraft carrier was issued 13 December 1923, but no work took place until 1925 as new plans were drafted and earthquake damage to the Yokosuka Naval Arsenal was repaired. She was officially commissioned on 31 March 1928, but this signified only the beginning of sea trials. She joined the Combined Fleet (Rengō Kantai) on 30 November 1929 as the IJN's third carrier to enter service, after Hōshō (1922) and Akagi (1927).

Kaga was completed with a length of 238.5 meters (782 ft 6 in) overall. She had a beam of 31.67 meters (103 ft 11 in) and a draft at full load of 7.92 meters (26 ft). She displaced 26,900 long tons (27,300 t) at standard load, and 33,693 long tons (34,234 t) at full load, nearly 6,000 long tons (6,100 t) less than her designed displacement as a battleship. Her complement totaled 1,340 crewmembers.

=== Flight deck arrangements ===
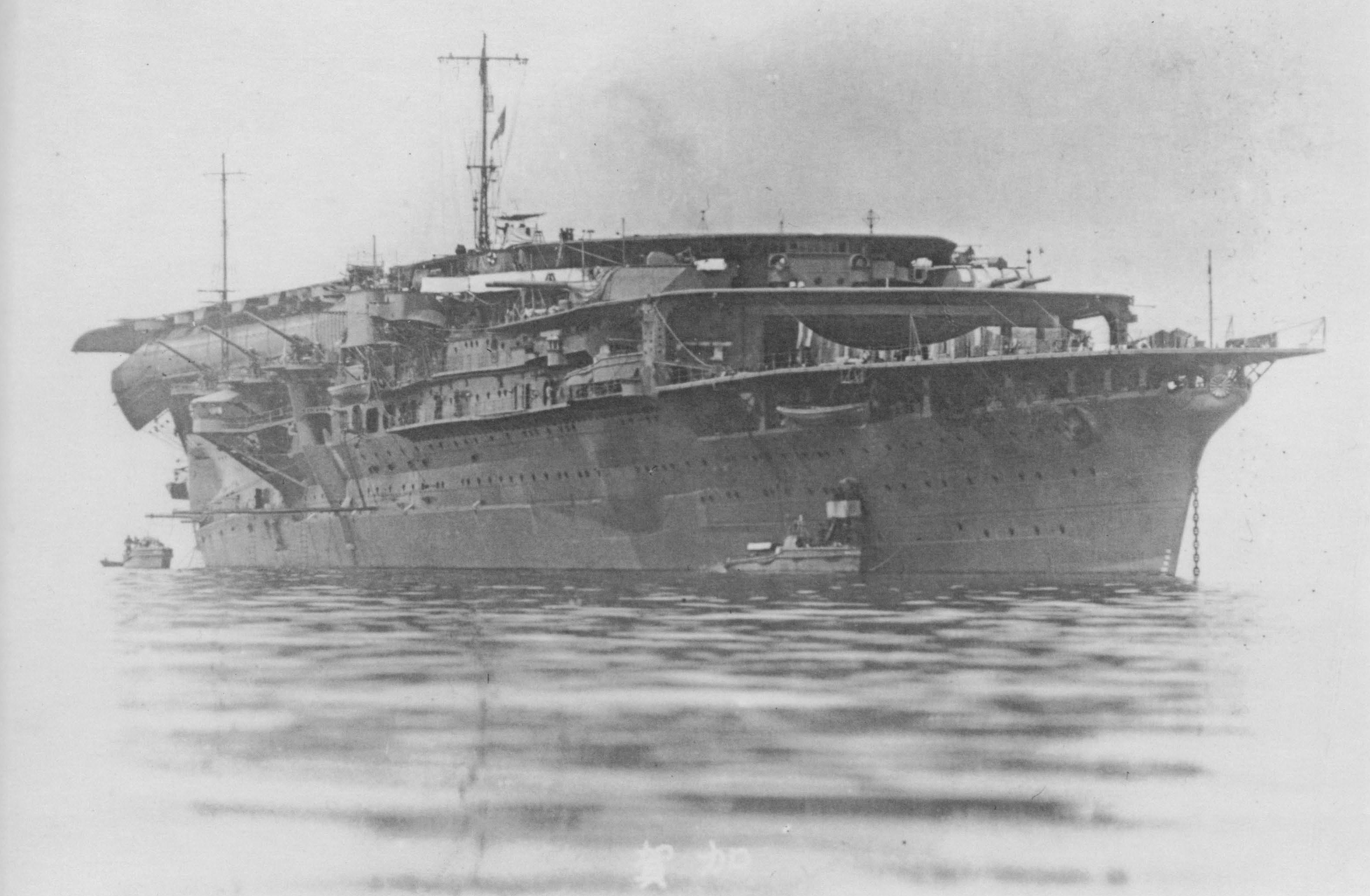
Kaga as completed, with all three flight decks visible. In fact, the intermediate deck was not a flight deck. It was not comunicating with the upper hangar.

Kaga, like Akagi, was completed with three superimposed flight decks, the only carriers ever to be designed so. The British carriers converted from "large light cruisers", Glorious, Courageous, and Furious, each had two flight decks, but there is no evidence that the Japanese copied the British model. It is more likely that it was a case of the parallel designs converging in separate attempts to improve launch and recovery cycle flexibility by allowing simultaneous launch and recovery of aircraft. Kaga's main flight deck was 171.2 meters (561 ft 8 in) long and 30.5 meters (100 ft) wide, her middle flight deck was only about 15 meters (49 ft 3 in) long and started in front of the bridge, and her lower flight deck was approximately 55 meters (180 ft 5 in) long. The utility of her middle flight deck was questionable as it was so short that only some of the lightly loaded aircraft could use it, even in an era when the aircraft were much lighter and smaller than they were during World War II. The ever-increasing growth in aircraft performance, size and weight during the 1930s meant that even the bottom flight deck was no longer able to accommodate the take-off roll required for the new generations of aircraft being fielded and it was plated over when the ship was modernized in the mid-1930s. Kaga lacked an island until one was added during the modernization.

As completed, the ship had two main hangar decks and a third auxiliary hangar with a total capacity of 60 aircraft. The hangars opened onto the middle and lower flight decks to allow aircraft to take off directly from the hangars while landing operations were in progress on the main flight deck above. No catapults were fitted. Her forward aircraft elevator was offset to starboard and 10.67 by 15.85 meters (35 by 52 ft) in size. Her aft elevator was on the centerline and 12.8 by 9.15 meters (42 by 30 ft). Her arresting gear was a French transverse system as used on their aircraft carrier Béarn and known as the Model Fju (Fju shiki) in the Japanese service. As originally completed, Kaga carried an air group of 28 Mitsubishi B1M3 torpedo bombers, 16 Nakajima A1N fighters and 16 Mitsubishi 2MR reconnaissance aircraft. (Note: Hata, p. 24, gives the carrier's initial aircraft complement as 12 Type 3 fighters (plus three crated spares), six reconnaissance aircraft (with two spares), and 18 torpedo bombers (six spares).)

=== Armament and armor ===
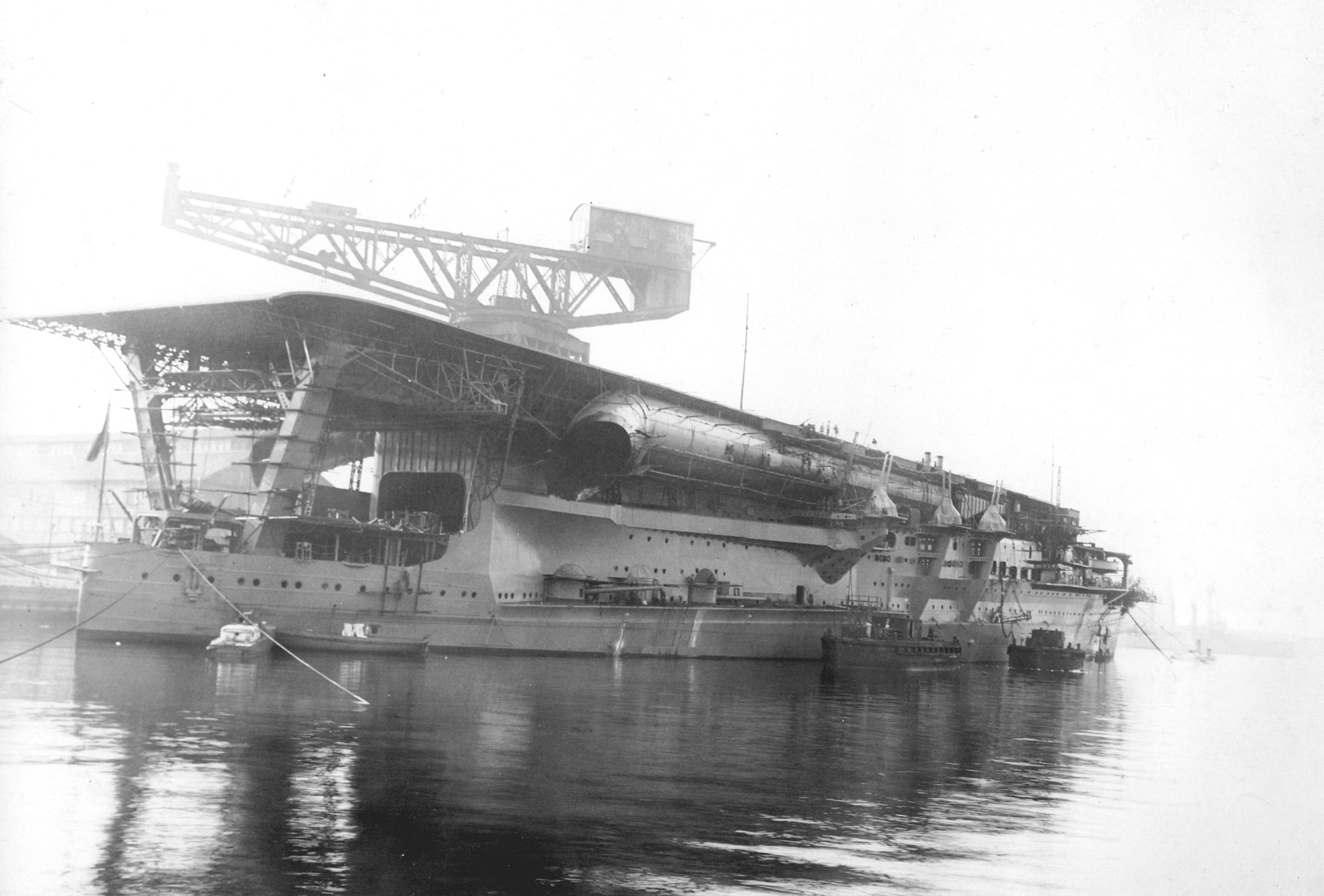
Kaga fitting-out in 1928. This stern view shows the long funnel extending aft below the flight deck, and three 200 mm guns in casemates.

Kaga was armed with ten 20 cm (7.9 in) 3rd Year Type guns, one twin-gun Type B turret on each side of the middle flight deck and six in casemates aft. They fired 110-kilogram (240 lb) projectiles at a rate of three to six rounds per minute with a muzzle velocity of 870 m/s (2,900 ft/s); at 25°, they had a maximum range between 22,600 and 24,000 m (24,700 and 26,200 yd). The Type B turrets were nominally capable of 70° elevation to provide additional anti-aircraft (AA) fire, but in practice the maximum elevation was only 55°. The slow rate of fire and the fixed 5° loading angle minimized any real anti-aircraft capability. This heavy gun armament was provided in case she was surprised by enemy cruisers and forced to give battle, but her large and vulnerable flight deck, hangars, and other features made her more of a target in any surface action than a fighting warship. Carrier doctrine was still evolving at this time and the impracticability of carriers engaging in gun duels had not yet been realized. (Note: The United States Navy did much the same with the provision of four twin 8-inch (203 mm) gun turrets on their Lexington-class carriers. See Gardiner and Grey, p. 110.)

She was given an anti-aircraft armament of six twin 12-centimeter (4.7 in) 10th Year Type Model A2 gun mounts fitted on sponsons below the level of the funnels, where they could not fire across the flight deck, three mounts per side. These guns fired 20.3-kilogram (45 lb) projectiles at a muzzle velocity of 825–830 m/s (2,707–2,723 ft/s); at 45° this provided a maximum range of 16,000 meters (17,000 yd), and they had a maximum ceiling of 10,000 meters (33,000 ft) at 75° elevation. Their effective rate of fire was 6 to 8 rounds per minute. She had two Type 89 directors to control her 20 cm guns and two Type 91 manually powered anti-aircraft directors (Kōshaki) to control her 12 cm guns. Kaga's waterline armored belt was reduced from 280 to 152 mm (11 to 6 in) during her reconstruction and the upper part of her torpedo bulge was given 127 mm (5 in) of armor. Her deck armor was also reduced from 102 to 38 mm (4 to 1 in).

=== Propulsion ===
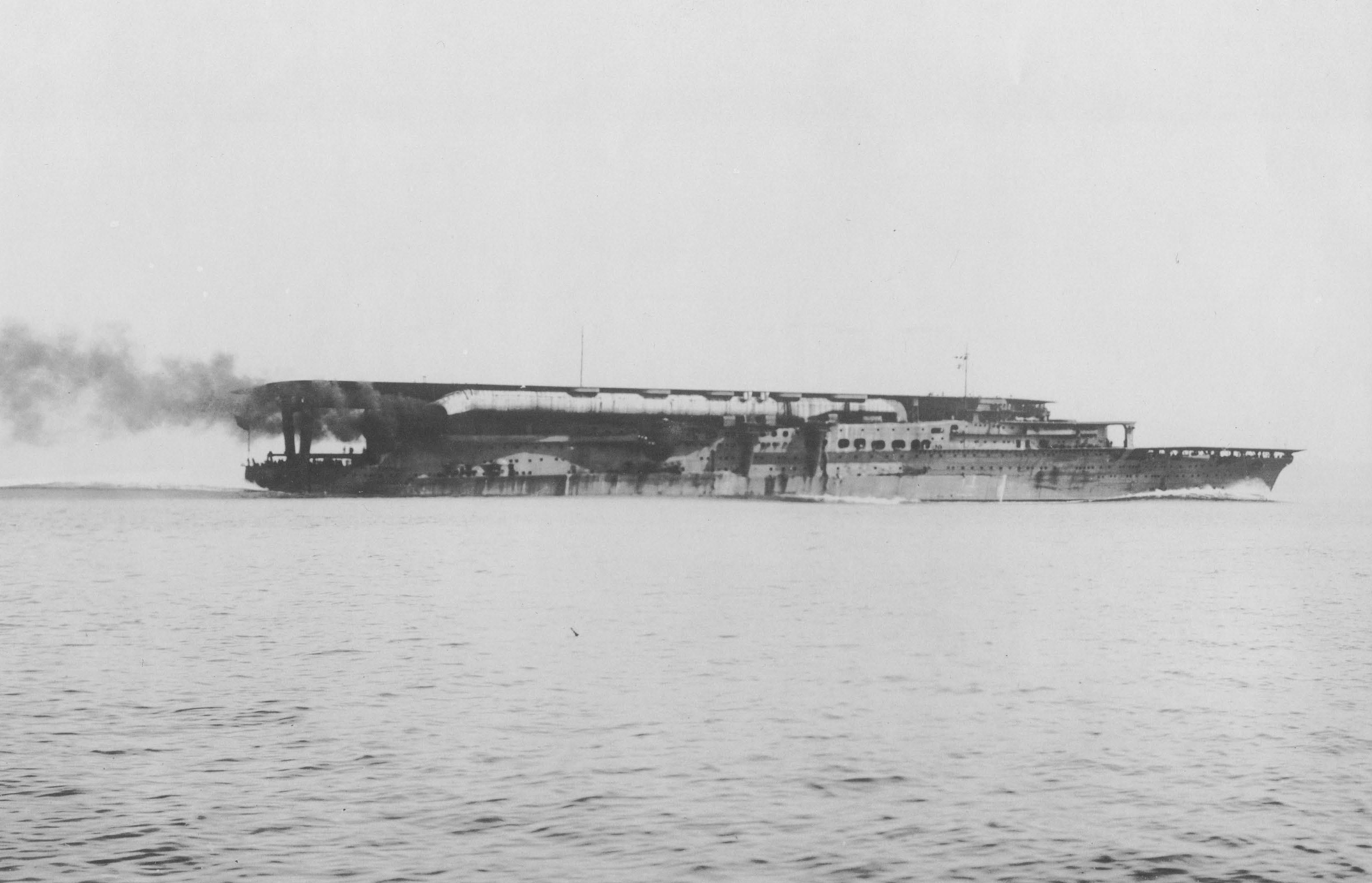
Kaga undergoing post-launch trials off Tateyama, 15 September 1928

When Kaga was being designed, the problem of how to deal with exhaust gases in carrier operations had not been resolved. The swiveling funnels of Hōshō had not proved successful and wind-tunnel testing had not provided an answer. As a result, Akagi and Kaga were given different exhaust systems to evaluate in real-world conditions. Kaga's funnel gases were collected in a pair of long horizontal ducts which discharged at the rear of each side of the flight deck, in spite of predictions by a number of prominent naval architects that they would not keep the hot gases away from the flight deck. The predictions proved to be correct, not least because Kaga was slower than Akagi, which allowed the gases to rise and interfere with landing operations. Another drawback was that the heat of the gases made the crew's quarters located on the side of the ship by the funnels almost uninhabitable.

Kaga was completed with four Kawasaki Brown-Curtis geared steam turbines with a total of 91,000 shaft horsepower (68,000 kW) on four shafts. As a battleship her expected speed had been 26.5 knots (49.1 km/h; 30.5 mph), but the reduction in displacement from 39,900 to 33,693 long tons (40,540 to 34,234 t) allowed this to increase to 27.5 knots (50.9 km/h; 31.6 mph), as demonstrated on her sea trials on 15 September 1928. She had twelve Kampon Type B (Ro) boilers with a working pressure of 20 kg/cm^{2} (2,000 kPa; 280 psi), although only eight were oil-fired. The other four used a mix of oil and coal. She carried 8,000 long tons (8,128 t) of fuel oil and 1,700 long tons (1,727 t) of coal to give her a range of 8,000 nautical miles (15,000 km; 9,200 mi) at 14 knots (26 km/h; 16 mph).

== Early service and development of carrier doctrine ==
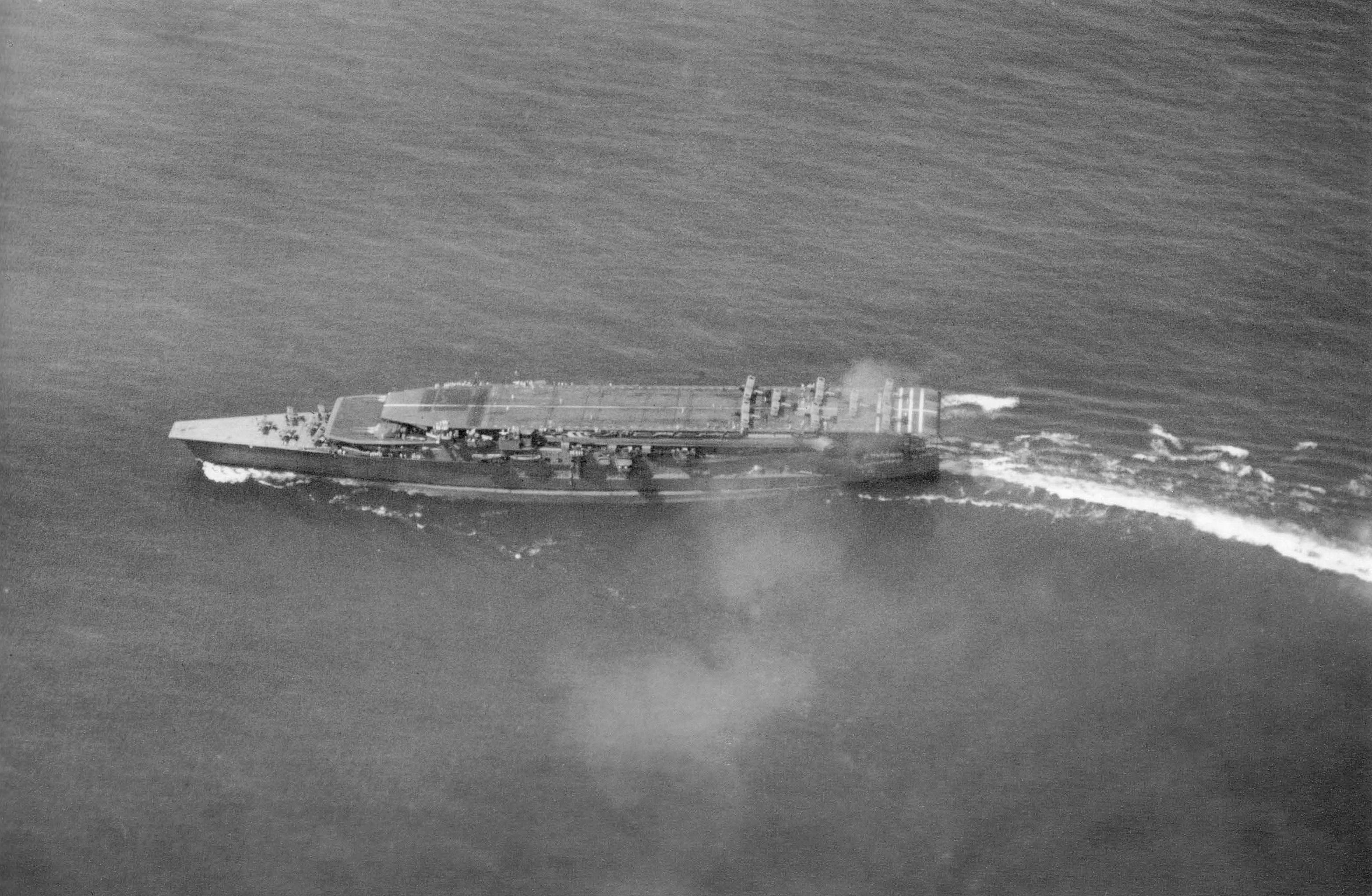
Kaga conducting air operations in 1930. On the upper deck are Mitsubishi B1M torpedo bombers preparing for takeoff. Nakajima A1N Type 3 fighters are parked on the lower deck forward.

On 1 December 1931 Kaga was assigned as the flagship of the First Carrier Division under the command of Rear Admiral Takayoshi Katō. The First Carrier Division, along with Hōshō, departed for Chinese waters on 29 January 1932 to support Imperial Japanese Army troops during the Shanghai Incident as part of the IJN's 3rd Fleet. The B1M3s carried by Kaga and Hōshō were the main bombers used during the brief combat over Shanghai.

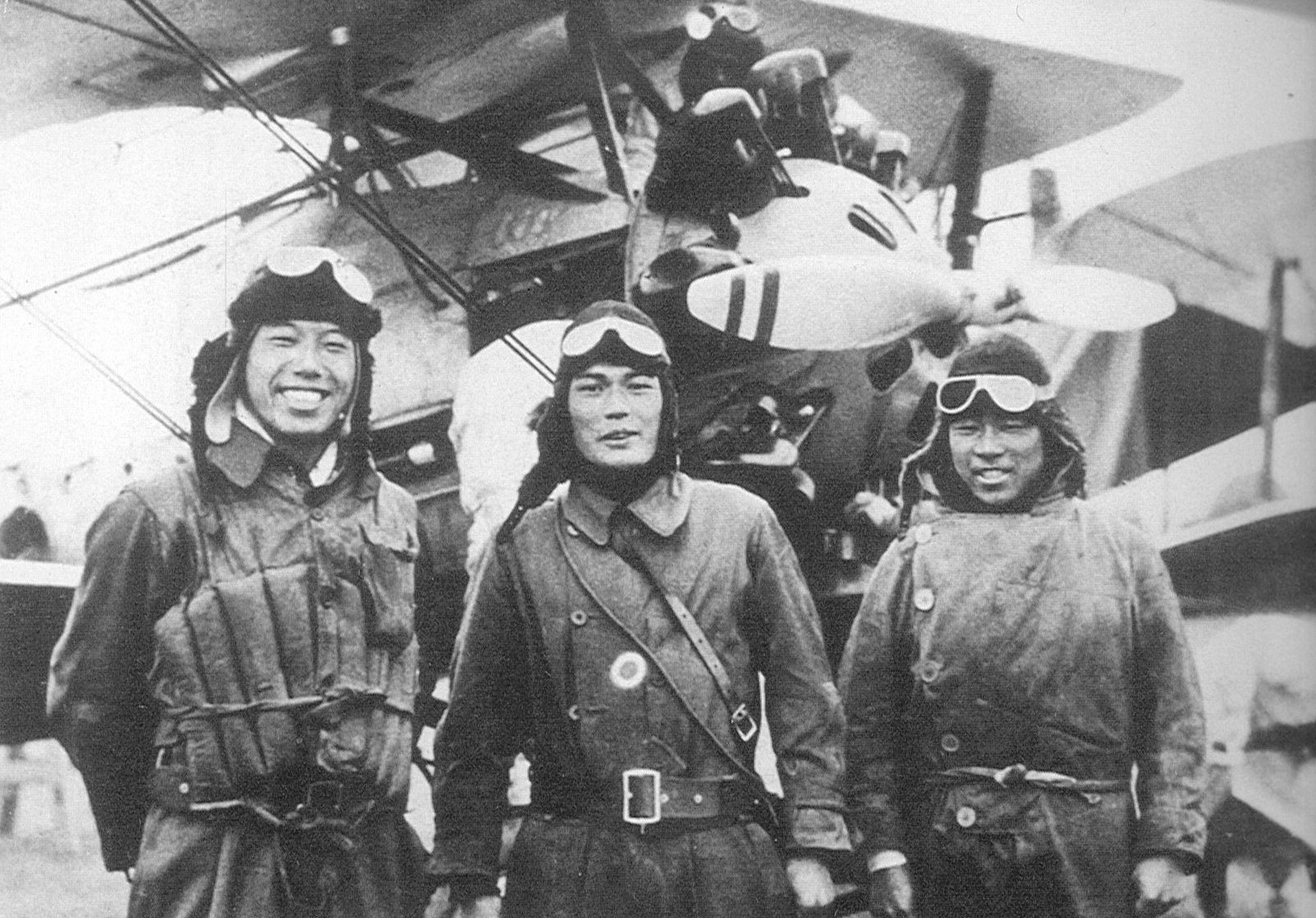
Ikuta, Kuroiwa, and Takeo pose in front of a Nakajima A1N2 Type 3

Kaga's aircraft, operating from both the carrier and a temporary base at Kunda Airfield in Shanghai, flew missions in support of Japanese ground forces throughout February 1932. During one of these missions three of Kaga's Nakajima A1N2 fighters, including one piloted by future ace Toshio Kuroiwa, escorting three Mitsubishi B1M3 torpedo bombers, scored the IJN's first air-to-air combat victory on 22 February when they shot down a Boeing P-12 flown by an American volunteer pilot. Kaga returned to home waters upon the declaration of the cease-fire on 3 March and resumed fleet training with the rest of the Combined Fleet.

At this time, the IJN's developing carrier doctrine was still in its earliest stages. Kaga and the other carriers were initially given roles as tactical force multipliers supporting the fleet's battleships in the IJN's "decisive battle" doctrine. In this role, Kaga's aircraft were to attack enemy battleships with bombs and torpedoes. Aerial strikes against enemy carriers were later, beginning around 1932–1933, deemed of equal importance in order to establish air superiority during the initial stages of battle. The essential component in this strategy was that the Japanese carrier aircraft must be able to strike first with a massed aerial attack. As a result, in fleet training exercises the carriers began to operate together in front of or with the main battle line. This revolutionary strategy emphasized maximum speed from both the carriers and the aircraft they carried as well as larger aircraft with greater range. Thus, longer flight decks on the carriers were required in order to handle the newer, heavier aircraft which were entering service.

Kaga was soon judged inferior to Akagi because of her slower speed, smaller flight deck (64 feet (19.5 m) shorter), and problematic funnel arrangement. Because of Kaga's perceived limitations, she was given priority over Akagi for modernization. Kaga was relegated to reserve status on 20 October 1933 to begin a second major reconstruction, with an official start date of 25 June 1934.

== Reconstruction ==
During her second reconstruction Kaga's two lower flight decks were converted into hangars and, along with the main flight deck, were extended to the bow. This increased the flight deck length to 248.55 meters (815 ft 5 in) and raised aircraft capacity to 90 (72 operational and 18 in storage). A third elevator forward, 11.5 by 12 meters (37 ft 9 in × 39 ft 4 in), serviced the extended hangars. Bomb and torpedo elevators were modified to deliver their munitions directly to the flight deck. Her arrester gear was replaced by a Japanese-designed Type 1 system. A small starboard island superstructure was also installed.

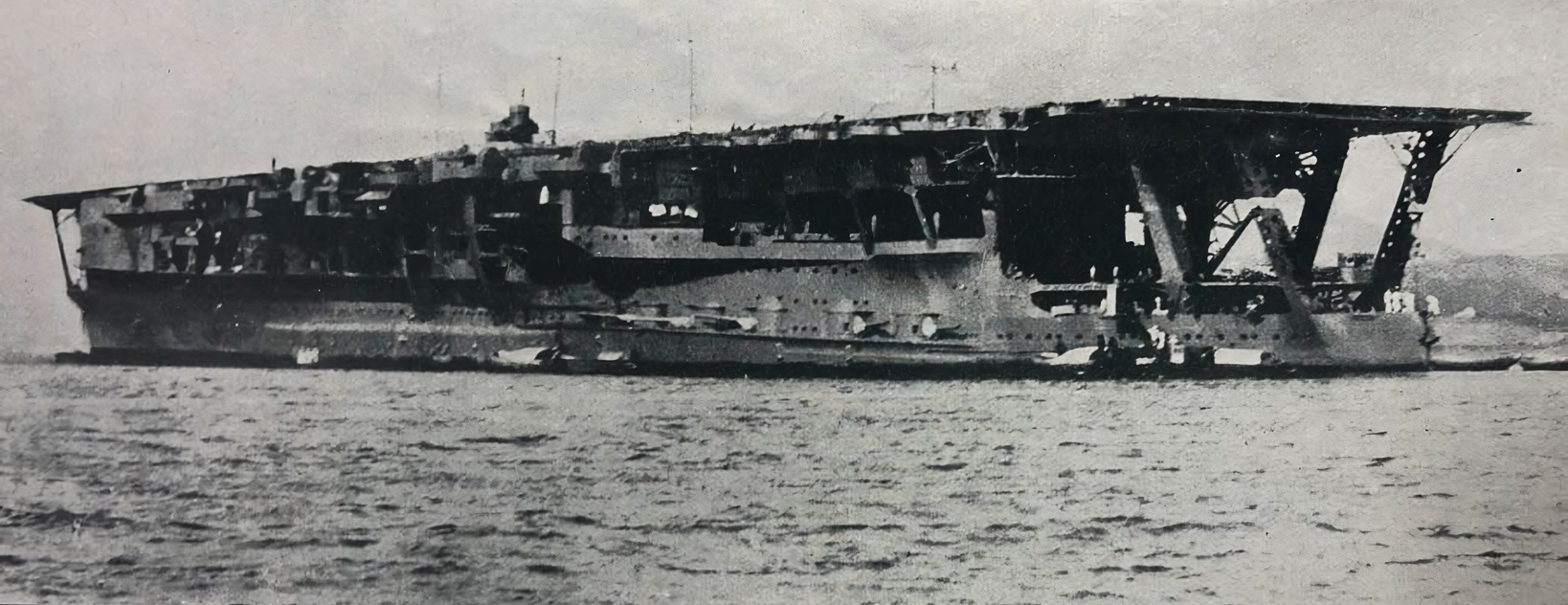
A rear oblique view of Kaga, c. 1935

Her power plant was completely replaced as were her propellers. Kaga was equipped with eight improved oil-burning models of the Kampon Type B (Ro) with a working pressure of 22 kg/cm^{2} (2,157 kPa; 313 psi) at a temperature of 300 °C (572 °F). New Kampon multi-stage geared turbines were fitted that increased her power from 91,000 to 127,400 shp (67,859 to 95,002 kW) during trials. The hull was lengthened by 10.3 meters (33 ft 10 in) at the stern to reduce drag and she was given another torpedo bulge above the side armor abreast the upper part of the existing bulge to increase her beam and lower her center of gravity as a result of lessons learned from the Tomozuru Incident in early 1934. This raised her standard displacement significantly, from 26,900 to 38,200 long tons (27,332 to 38,813 t). The extra power and the extra displacement roughly offset each other and her speed increased by less than a knot, up to 28.34 knots (52.49 km/h; 32.61 mph) on trials. Her fuel storage was increased to 7,500 long tons (7,620 t) of fuel oil which increased her endurance to 10,000 nmi (19,000 km; 12,000 mi) at 16 knots (30 km/h; 18 mph). The lengthy funnel ducting was replaced by a single downturned starboard funnel modeled on that used by the Akagi with a water-cooling system for the exhaust gasses and a cover that could be raised to allow the exhaust gasses to escape if the ship developed a severe list and the mouth of the funnel touched the sea. The space freed up by the removal of the funnel ducts was divided into two decks and converted into living quarters for the expanded air group. The carrier's complement increased to 1708 crewmembers.

The two twin turrets on the middle flight deck were removed and four new 20 cm 3rd Year Type No. 1 guns in casemates were added forward. Her 12 cm anti-aircraft guns were replaced by eight 12.7-centimeter (5.0 in) Type 89 guns in twin mounts. They fired 23.45-kilogram (51.7 lb) projectiles at a rate between 8 and 14 rounds per minute at a muzzle velocity of 700–725 m/s (2,300–2,380 ft/s); at 45°, this provided a maximum range of 14,800 meters (16,200 yd), and a maximum ceiling of 9,400 meters (30,800 ft). Their sponsons were raised one deck to allow them some measure of cross-deck fire. Eleven twin 25 mm Type 96 gun mounts were added, also on sponsons. They fired 0.25-kilogram (0.55 lb) projectiles at a muzzle velocity of 900 m/s (3,000 ft/s); at 50°, this provided a maximum range of 7,500 meters (8,202 yd), and an effective ceiling of 5,500 meters (18,000 ft). The maximum effective rate of fire was only between 110 and 120 rounds per minute due to the frequent need to change the fifteen-round magazines. Six 6.5-millimeter (0.26 in) Type 11 machine guns were also carried. Six Type 95 directors were fitted to control the new 25 mm guns, but Kaga retained her outdated Type 91 anti-aircraft directors.

Several major weaknesses in Kaga's design were not rectified. Kaga's aviation fuel tanks were incorporated directly into the structure of the carrier, meaning that shocks to the ship, such as those caused by bomb or shell hits, would be transmitted directly to the tanks, resulting in cracks or leaks. Also, the fully enclosed structure of the new hangar decks made fire suppression difficult, at least in part because fuel vapors could accumulate in the hangars. Adding to the danger was the requirement from the Japanese carrier doctrine that aircraft be serviced, fueled, and armed whenever possible on the hangar decks rather than on the flight deck. In addition, the carrier's hangar and flight decks carried little armor protection. Furthermore, there was no redundancy in the ship's fire-extinguishing systems. These weaknesses would later be crucial factors in the loss of the ship.

== Sino-Japanese War ==
Kaga returned to service in 1935 and was assigned to the Second Carrier Division. The carrier embarked a new set of aircraft, including 16 Nakajima A2N Type 90 fighters, 16 Aichi D1A Type 94/96 dive bombers, and 28 Mitsubishi B2M Type 89 torpedo bombers.

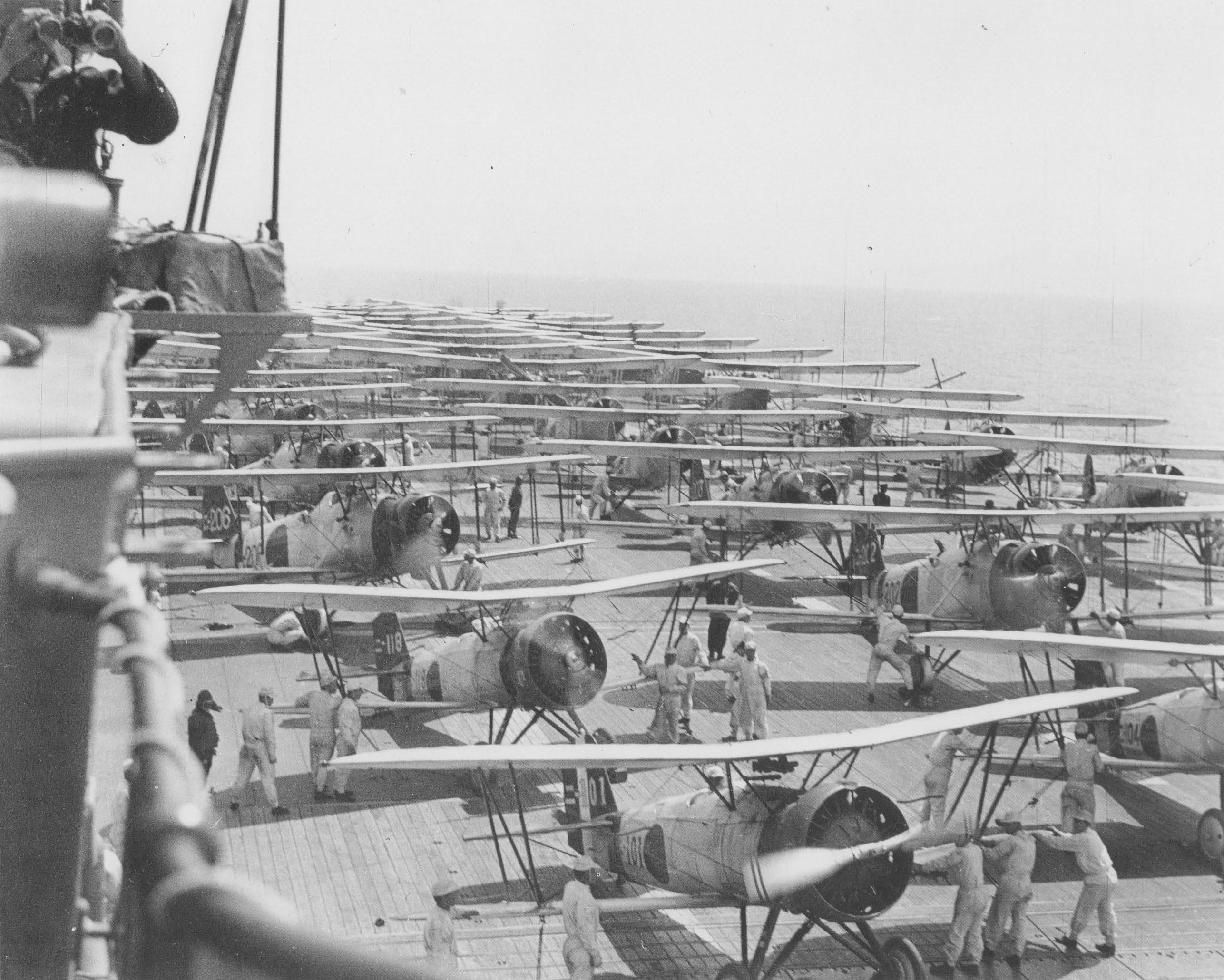
Kaga conducts air operations in 1937; on deck are Nakajima A2N, Aichi D1A, and Mitsubishi B2M aircraft

The renewal of hostilities with China at the Marco Polo Bridge in July 1937 found Kaga in home waters. The ship's fighter squadron completed training at Ōmura, Nagasaki then helped escort ships taking army reinforcements from Japan to China. On 15 August, along with Hōshō and Ryūjō, the ship took station in the East China Sea as part of the 3rd Fleet and began supporting Japanese military operations along the central China coast around Shanghai and further inland.

Kaga aircraft fought their first battle on 15 August 1937, when thirteen Aichi D1A1 (Type 94) dive-bombers encountered Curtiss A-12 Shrike attack-bombers from the 26th and 27th Squadrons of the Chinese Air Force at Chao'er Airbase preparing for strikes against Japanese positions in Shanghai. A dogfight duly ensued between the two unlikely dogfighting opponents; two D1A1s were shot down; a third badly shot-up D1A1 returned to Kaga with a fatally wounded crewman, while the D1A1 flight claimed three Shrikes. On 16 August 1937, six Type 90 fighters engaged four Chinese aircraft over Jiangwan, shooting down three without loss. Between 17 August and 7 September, Kaga's Type 90 and two Mitsubishi A5M Type 96 fighters, which joined the carrier on 22 August, engaged Chinese aircraft on several more occasions. Kaga's fighter pilots claimed to have shot down 10 Chinese aircraft in these encounters without loss. On 17 August twelve of the carrier's bombers attacked Hangzhou without fighter escort and 11 of them were shot down by Chinese fighters. On 7 September, three Type 96 (A5M) fighters escorted six Type 96 (D1A2) bombers and were engaged by three Chinese Hawk IIIs near Taihu Lake; two Type 96 bombers were quickly shot down, but the ensuing half-hour long dogfight resulted in no further losses for either side despite claims. Beginning on 15 September, six Type 90 and six Type 96 fighters, 18 dive bombers, and 18 torpedo bombers were temporarily deployed to Kunda Airfield from the ship to support land operations.

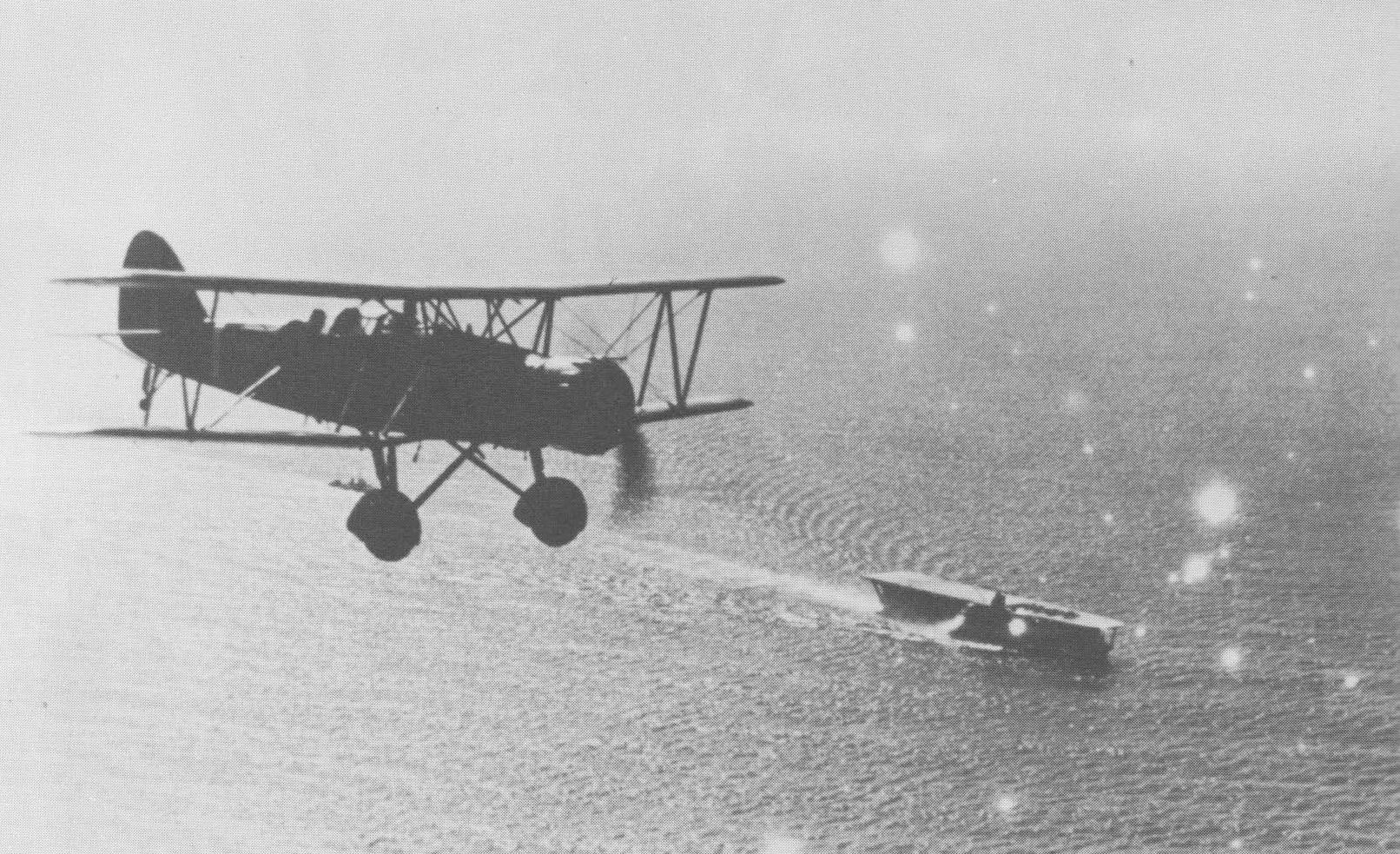
An D1A2 dive bomber flies near Kaga during the China incident

On 26 September the carrier went to Sasebo for reprovisioning. At Sasebo, the carrier received new replacement aircraft including 32 Yokosuka B4Y Type 96 carrier attack planes (torpedo bombers), 16 Aichi D1A2 Type 96 carrier bombers (dive bombers), and 16 more Type 96 fighters. Several Nakajima A4N Type 95 fighter aircraft augmented the carrier's fighter group at an unspecified later date.

Kaga returned to the front in early October 1937, and except for two brief trips to Sasebo, remained off China until December 1938. Using Taiwan (then part of the Empire of Japan) as its base, the carrier steamed 29,048 nautical miles (53,797 km; 33,428 mi) supporting military operations from the South and East China Seas. During that time, Kaga bombers supported army operations by attacking enemy railroad bridges, airfields, and transportation vehicles. The carrier's fighter pilots claimed to have destroyed at least 17 Chinese aircraft in aerial combat while losing five aircraft themselves. On 12 December 1937 Kaga aircraft participated in the Panay incident.

On 11 November 1937, three Chinese Air Force Northrop Gamma 2ECs of the 2nd BG, 14th Squadron led by Captain Yu Y.C. attacked Kaga off the Maanshan Islands near Shanghai; the bombs fell wide into Kaga's wake, and the Chinese Gammas were pursued and intercepted by three A5Ms of Kaga's combat air patrol (CAP) led by flight leader Jirō Chōno, which shot down two of the Gammas, while Yu managed to escape into the clouds and return to base in his damaged Gamma.

Six Kaga fighters were assigned to land bases near Shanghai and Nanking between 9 December 1937 and 15 January 1938. Nine fighters were temporarily based out of Nanking from 3 March through 4 April 1938. On 13 April 1938, Kaga launched eighteen D1A1s and three each of A4Ns and A5Ms on a strike against Canton, and they were met by two squadrons of Gloster Gladiators of the 5th Fighter Group led by Captain John Xinrui Huang and Captain Louie Yim-qun; Huang would score a triple kill in this battle against the Kaga raid, while Jirō Chōno (A5M) and Hatsuo Hidaka (A4N) would each claim double kills, including Chōno's shooting-down of Huang, who was injured bailing out. Kaga's fighter group at this time included future aces Jirō Chōno, Osamu Kudō, Yoshio Fukui, Watari Handa, Masaichi Kondō, Hatsuo Hidaka, Kiichi Oda, Satoru Ono, and Chitoshi Isozaki. The US Navy decrypted an IJN message which reportedly indicated that the attack on the Panay and other neutral ships in the Yangtze River had been knowingly and deliberately planned by an air officer on Kaga.

Kaga entered the shipyard on 15 December 1938, where her arresting gear was replaced by a Type 3 system and her bridge was modernized. The flight deck and hangar areas were enlarged, increasing the carrier's aircraft capacity. The ship was completely overhauled from 15 November 1939 to 15 November 1940 before returning to active service. In the meantime, a new generation of aircraft had entered service and Kaga embarked 12 A5M fighters, 24 D1A dive bombers and 36 B4Y torpedo bombers. Another 18 aircraft were carried in crates as spares. (Note: Hata, p. 27, gives Kaga's aircraft complement after overhaul as 12 fighters with four spares, 18 dive bombers with six spares, and 48 torpedo bombers with 16 spares.)

The Japanese carriers' experiences off China had helped further develop the IJN's carrier doctrine. One lesson learned in China was the importance of concentration and mass in projecting naval air power ashore. Therefore, in April 1941 the IJN formed the First Air Fleet to combine all of its fleet carriers under a single command. On 10 April 1941 Kaga was assigned to the First Carrier Division with Akagi as part of the new carrier fleet, which also included the Second and Fifth carrier divisions. The IJN centered its doctrine on airstrikes that combined the air groups within carrier divisions, rather than each individual carrier. When more than one carrier division was operating together, the divisions' air groups were combined with each other. This doctrine of combined, massed, carrier air attack groups was the most advanced of its kind of all the world's navies. The IJN, however, remained concerned that concentrating all of its carriers together would render them vulnerable to being wiped out all at once by a massive enemy air or surface strike. Thus, the IJN developed a compromise solution in which the fleet carriers would operate closely together within their carrier divisions but the divisions themselves would operate in loose rectangular formations, with approximately 7,000 metres (7,700 yd) separating the carriers from each other. (Note: According to Parshall and Tully, pp. 86–87, the Japanese would not usually launch their entire carrier air groups into a single massed attack. Instead, each carrier would launch a "deckload strike" of all its aircraft that could be spotted at one time on each flight deck. Subsequent attack waves consisted of the next deckload of aircraft. Thus, 1st Air Fleet air attacks would often consist of at least two, massed waves of aircraft. Peattie (p. 152) and Jisaburō Ozawa (Goldstein, pp. 78–80) emphasize that the First Air Fleet was not the IJN's primary strategic striking force. The IJN still considered the First Air Fleet an integral component in the Combined Fleet's decisive battle task force centered on battleships.)

Although the concentration of so many fleet carriers into a single unit was a new and revolutionary offensive strategic concept, the First Air Fleet suffered from several defensive deficiencies which gave it, in Mark Peattie's words, a "'glass jaw': it could throw a punch but couldn't take one." Japanese carrier anti-aircraft guns and associated fire control systems had several design and configuration deficiencies which limited their effectiveness. The IJN's fleet CAP consisted of too few fighter aircraft and was hampered by an inadequate early warning system, including a lack of radar. Poor radio communications with the fighter aircraft inhibited effective command and control of the CAP. The carriers' escorting warships were deployed as visual scouts in a ring at long range, not as close anti-aircraft escorts, as they lacked training, doctrine, and sufficient anti-aircraft guns. These deficiencies would eventually doom Kaga and other First Air Fleet carriers.

== World War II ==
=== Pearl Harbor ===
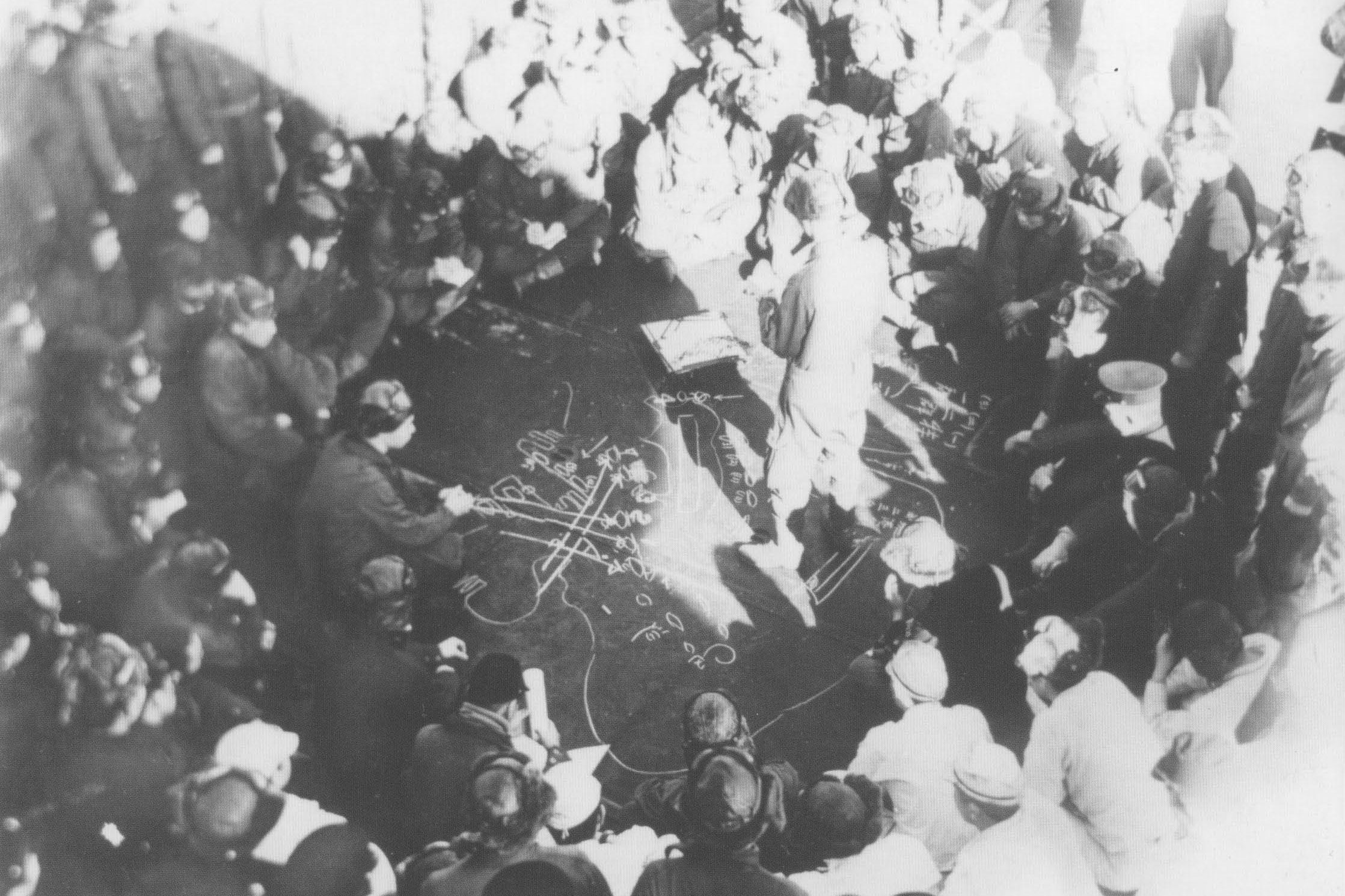
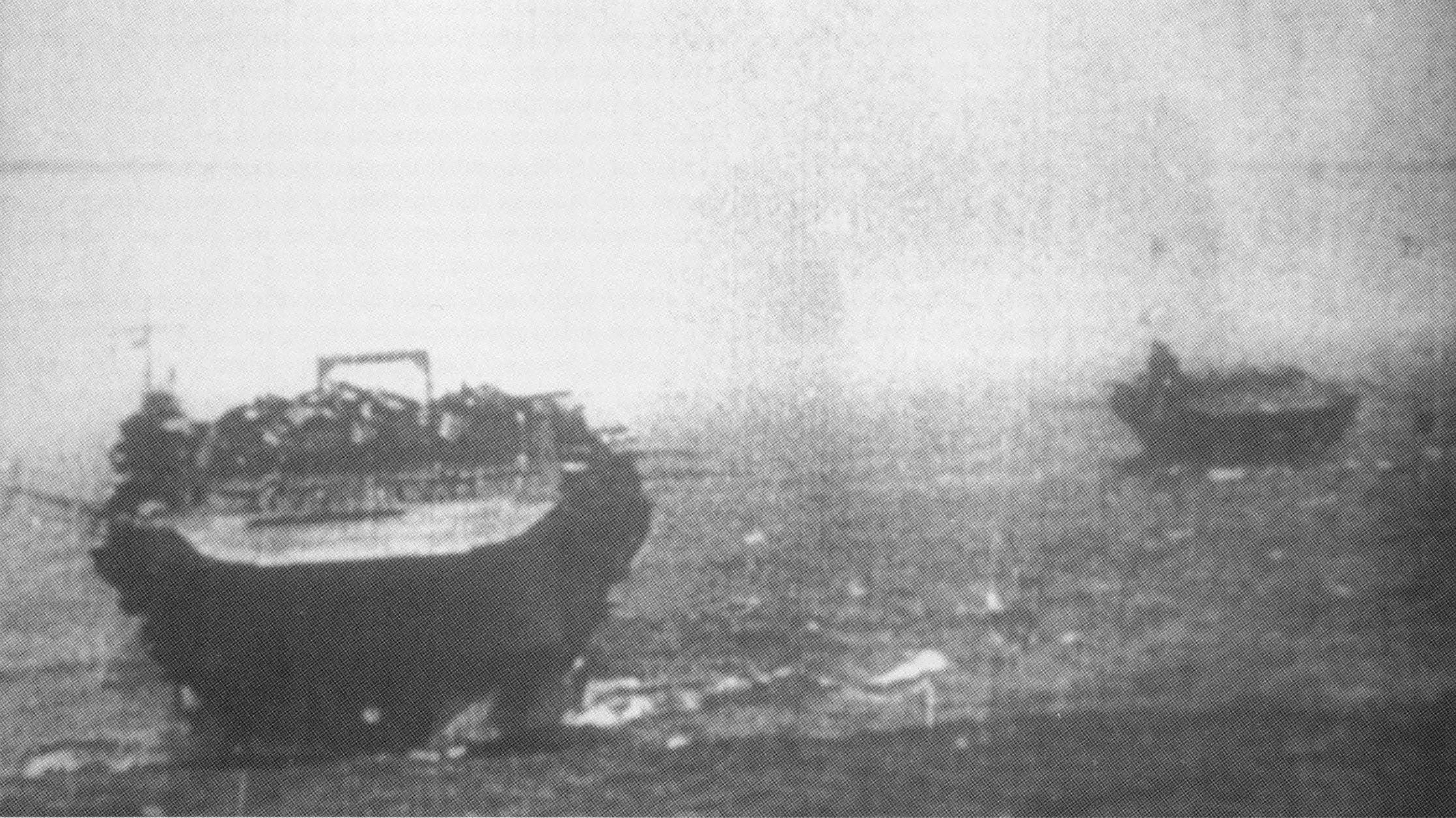
Left: Lieutenant Ichirō Kitajima briefs his B5N crews on the carrier deck about the attack plan the day before the raid on Pearl Harbor. Right: Kaga (foreground), with Zuikaku (background), heads towards Pearl Harbor sometime between 26 November and 7 December 1941.

In November 1941 the IJN's Combined Fleet, under Isoroku Yamamoto, prepared to participate in Japan's initiation of a formal war with the United States by conducting a preemptive strike against the United States Navy's Pacific Fleet base at Pearl Harbor, Hawaii. On 17 November Kaga, under the command of Captain Jisaku Okada, loaded 100 torpedoes at Saeki Bay, Hiroshima; these torpedoes were specially designed for use in the shallow waters of the Pearl Harbor anchorage. On 19 November, Kaga and the rest of the Combined Fleet's mobile strike force (Kido Butai), under Chuichi Nagumo and including six fleet carriers from the First, Second, and Fifth Carrier Divisions, assembled in Hitokappu Bay at Etorofu Island. The fleet departed Etorofu on 26 November and followed a course across the north-central Pacific to avoid commercial shipping lanes.

For the attack on Pearl Harbor, Kaga carried a total of 18 Mitsubishi A6M Zero fighters, 27 Nakajima B5N torpedo bombers and 27 Aichi D3A (Note: The Allied reporting name for these aircraft were "Zeke", "Kate" and "Val" respectively.) dive bombers, plus three crated aircraft of each type for the operation. During the morning of 7 December 1941 Kaga aircraft participated in both First Air Fleet strikes launched against Oahu from a position 230 nautical miles (430 km) north of the island. In the first strike of 183 total aircraft (six aborted), 26 Kaga B5N carrier attack bombers attacked the American ships at anchor with bombs and torpedoes, escorted by nine Zeros. In the second strike of 167 aircraft (four aborted), 26 Kaga D3A dive bombers targeted the airfield at Ford Island in the middle of the harbor while nine Zeros provided escort and attacked aircraft on the ground. A total of five B5Ns, four Zeros and six D3As from the ship were lost during the two strikes, along with their aircrews, a total of 31 personnel. Kaga's bomber and torpedo crews claimed hits on the battleships Nevada, Oklahoma, Arizona, California, West Virginia, and Maryland. The ship's fighter pilots claimed to have shot down one US aircraft and destroyed 20 on the ground. (Note: Fourteen of the B5N in the first wave carried bombs and the other 12 torpedoes. A 15th bomb-carrying B5N aborted due to engine trouble. Five torpedo planes and two Zeros were lost in the first wave and two Zeros and the six dive bombers in the second wave (Werneth, p. 111).) Upon completion of the attack, the First and Fifth Carrier divisions, including Kaga, returned immediately to Japan.

=== Pacific conquest ===
In January 1942, together with the rest of the First and Fifth Carrier Division carriers and staging out of Truk (now Chuuk) in Micronesia, Kaga supported the invasion of Rabaul in the Bismarck Islands. Kaga provided 27 bomb-carrying B5N and 9 Zeros for the initial airstrike on Rabaul on 20 January 1942, during which one B5N was shot down by anti-aircraft fire. The First Carrier Division attacked Allied positions at nearby Kavieng the following day, of which Kaga contributed nine Zeros and sixteen D3As. On the 22nd Kaga's D3As and Zeros again attacked Rabaul and two dive bombers had to make emergency landings, but the crews were rescued. Kaga returned to Truk on 25 January and Rabaul and Kavieng were successfully occupied by Japanese forces by February.

On 9 February Kaga hit a reef at Palau after she had unsuccessfully sortied against American carrier forces attacking the Marshall Islands on 1 February. The damage reduced the carrier's speed to 18 knots. (Note: Takeshi Maeda, a B5N crewmember on Kaga, states that the carrier grounded at Staring Bay in March, not at Palau in February. The discrepancy is not explained in the sources. (Werneth, p. 116)) After temporary repairs, she continued to the Timor Sea, where on 19 February 1942 she, with the other carriers of the First and Second Carrier Divisions, launched air strikes against Darwin, Australia, from a point 100 nautical miles (190 km) southeast of the easternmost tip of Timor. Kaga contributed 27 B5Ns (carrying bombs), 18 D3A, and 9 Zeros to the attack, which caught the defenders by surprise. Eight ships were sunk, including the destroyer Peary, and fourteen more were damaged, at a cost of only one of Kaga's B5Ns. In March 1942, Kaga, based out of Staring-baai, helped cover the invasion of Java, although her only contribution appears to have been aircraft for the 5 March 1942 airstrike on Tjilatjap. In that attack Kaga contributed 27 bomb-carrying B5N escorted by nine Zeros. The attacking aircraft bombed merchant ships in the harbor, sinking eight of them, and attacked anti-aircraft batteries and a warehouse without loss. Most of the Allied forces in the Dutch East Indies surrendered to the Japanese later in March. Kaga was unable to participate in the Indian Ocean raid in April because of the damage she had received in February. Instead, she sailed for Sasebo on 15 March for repairs, entering drydock on 27 March. The repairs were completed on 4 May. (Note: While Kaga was in drydock on 18 April 12 Zeros from the carrier's air group based at Kisarazu Air Field participated in the failed counterattack against the US carriers which had launched the Doolittle Raid bombers. The attack group, including 29 land bombers and 12 Zeros from the 26th Air Flotilla in addition to the Kaga fighters, flew east for 600 nmi (1,100 km; 690 mi) before turning back after being unable to locate the American carriers, which had already departed the area (Hata, p. 148). After the Indian Ocean raid, Kaga was used for limited air operations training by all the First Air Fleet air units in May as the other carriers were in the shipyard for refitting. (Parshall and Tully, p. 88))

=== Battle of Midway ===
==== Midway raid ====
Concerned by the US carrier strikes such as the Doolittle Raid, on the Marshall Islands, and the Lae-Salamaua raids, Yamamoto was determined to force the US Navy into a showdown to eliminate the American carrier threat. Yamamoto decided to invade and occupy Midway Island, which he was sure would draw out the American carrier forces to battle. The Midway invasion was codenamed by the Japanese as Operation MI.

In support of MI, on 27 May 1942, Kaga departed the Inland Sea with the Combined Fleet on her final mission, in the company of carriers Akagi, Hiryū, and Sōryū which constituted the First and Second Carrier Divisions. Her aircraft complement was 27 Zeros, 20 D3As, and 27 B5Ns. (Note: Nine of the Zeros were intended to be stationed on Midway after the invasion and belonged to the 6th Air Group. Two of the D3As were in crates and were either replacements for Sōryū or also members of the 6th Air Group. (Parshall and Tully, p. 451)) With the fleet positioned 250 nmi (460 km; 290 mi) northwest of Midway Island at dawn on 4 June 1942, Kaga contributed eighteen D3As, commanded by Lieutenant Shōichi Ogawa, escorted by nine Zeros to the strike against the island. The carrier's B5Ns were armed with torpedoes and kept ready in case enemy ships were discovered during the Midway raid. One each of the D3As and Zeros was shot down by AA fire over Midway, and another four D3As were damaged. Kaga's Zero pilots claimed to have shot down 12 US aircraft over Midway Island. One Kaga B5N was launched to augment the fleet's reconnaissance of the surrounding ocean. (Note: Twenty-five total US aircraft were lost over Midway during the air raid. (Willmott, p. 380)) The carrier also put up two Zeros on CAP. Another five Zeros reinforced her CAP at 07:00 and the seven fighters helped to defend the Kido Butai from the first US air attackers from Midway Island at 07:10. Unknown to the Japanese, the US Navy had divined the Japanese MI plan from signals intelligence and had prepared an ambush using its three available carriers, positioned northeast of Midway.

At 07:15 Admiral Nagumo ordered the B5Ns still on Kaga and Akagi rearmed with bombs for another attack on Midway itself. This process was limited by the number of ordnance carts used to handle the bombs and torpedoes and the limited number of ordnance elevators. Thus, the torpedoes could not be struck below until after all the bombs were moved up from their magazine, assembled and mounted on the aircraft. This process normally took about an hour and a half; more time would be required to bring the aircraft up to the flight deck and warm up and launch the strike group. Around 07:40 Nagumo reversed his order when he received a message that American carriers had been spotted. At 07:30 Kaga recovered three of her CAP.

==== Sinking ====
Kaga's four remaining CAP fighters were in the process of landing when 16 SBD Dauntless dive-bombers of the United States Marine Corps from Midway, led by Lofton R. Henderson, attacked Hiryū around 07:55 without result. Five Zeros were launched at 08:15 and three intercepted a dozen United States Army Midway-based B-17 Flying Fortresses attempting to bomb the three other carriers from 20,000 feet (6,100 m), but only limited damage was inflicted on the heavy bombers, although their attacks all missed. Five D3As also joined the CAP around this time. Another trio of Zeros were launched at 08:30. Kaga began landing her returning Midway strike force aboard around 08:35 and was finished by 08:50; one Zero pilot died after crash-landing his aircraft.

The five Zeros launched at 08:15 were recovered aboard at 09:10 and replaced by six more Zeros launched at 09:20. They intercepted the first US carrier aircraft to attack, TBD Devastator torpedo-bombers of VT-8 from the US carrier Hornet at 09:22, and shot down all 15, leaving only a single survivor, George H. Gay, Jr., treading water. Shortly thereafter, 14 Devastators from VT-6 from the US carrier Enterprise, led by Eugene E. Lindsey, were spotted. They tried to sandwich Kaga, but the CAP, reinforced by another six Zeros launched by Kaga at 10:00, shot down all but four of the Devastators, and the carrier dodged the torpedoes.

Soon after the torpedo plane attacks, American carrier dive bombers arrived over the Japanese carriers almost undetected and began their dives. At 10:22, 25 SBD Dauntless dive-bombers from Enterprise, led by C. Wade McClusky, hit Kaga with one 1,000-pound (450 kg) bomb and at least three 500-pound (230 kg) bombs. The first landed near her rear elevator and set the berthing compartments on fire, and the next bomb hit the forward elevator and penetrated the upper hangar, setting off explosions and fires among the armed and fueled planes on her hangar deck. The third bomb exploded directly on the island, destroying the bridge, killing Okada and most of his command staff. The 1000-pound bomb hit amidships and penetrated the flight deck to explode on the upper hangar. The explosions ruptured the ship's avgas lines, damaged both her port and starboard fire mains and the emergency generator powering her fire pumps, as well as knocking out the carbon dioxide fire suppression system. Fueled by the avgas pouring onto the hangar deck, the fires detonated the 80,000 pounds (36,000 kg) of bombs and torpedoes strewn across the hangar deck in a series of catastrophic multiple fuel-air explosions that blew out the hangar sides. At nearly the same time, dive bombers hit and fatally damaged Akagi and Sōryū. (Note: USS Nautilus fired four torpedoes at the carrier; one misfired, two others missed, and one hit the burning Kaga around 14:05, but it was a dud. (Parshall and Tully, pp. 302–303) The torpedo broke in two and the warhead portion sank. The floating half was later used as a life preserver by several Kaga survivors. (Willmott, p. 427))

Unable to contain her fires, Kaga's survivors were taken off by the destroyers Hagikaze and Maikaze between 14:00 and 17:00. (Note: Parshall and Tully (p. 337) state that the two destroyers rescued over 700 of the carrier's crew. Since the carrier reportedly had a complement of 1708 (Parshall and Tully, p. 467), there should have been around 900 survivors, but the discrepancy in the numbers is not explained by the sources.) Around 19:25 she was scuttled by two torpedoes from Hagikaze and sank stern-first at position 30°23′N 179°17′W. Warrant Officer Takeshi Maeda, an injured Kaga B5N aircrew member rescued by Hagikaze, described the scene: "My comrade carried me up to the deck so I could see the last moments of our beloved carrier, which was nearby. Even though I was in pain, tears started to run down my cheeks, and everyone around me was crying; it was a very sad sight."

The carrier's crew suffered 811 fatalities, mainly among the aircraft mechanics and armorers stationed on the hangar decks and the ship's engineers, many of whom were trapped below in the boiler and engine rooms by uncontrolled fires raging on the decks above them. Twenty-one of the ship's aviators were killed. (Note: Peattie, p. 338, states that eight Kaga airmen were killed in the air and 13 died aboard the ship. Of the 15 Kaga CAP Zeros airborne at the time the carrier was hit, five were destroyed in aerial combat and the remainder were recovered by Hiryū. Two subsequently participated in the second Hiryū airstrike on Yorktown while four others augmented the remaining carrier's CAP. All 10 pilots survived (Parshall and Tully, pp. 502–503; Lundstrom, pp. 351, 414).) Kaga's surviving crewmembers were restricted incommunicado to an airbase in Kyūshū for one to two months after returning to Japan, to help conceal word of the Midway defeat from the Japanese public. Many of the survivors were then transferred back to frontline units without being allowed to contact family. Some of the injured were quarantined in hospitals for almost a year. This was the highest loss of lives of all the Japanese carriers lost at Midway.

The loss of Kaga and the three other IJN carriers at Midway (Hiryū, Sōryū, and Akagi were also sunk during the battle), with their aircraft and veteran pilots, was a crucial strategic defeat for Japan and contributed significantly to Japan's ultimate defeat in the war.

== Wreck survey ==
In May 1999, the Nauticos Corporation, in partnership with the US Navy, discovered some wreckage from Kaga. They employed the research vessel Melville during a survey of a fleet exercise area with the US Navy's recently modified SEAMAP acoustic imaging system. A follow-on search by USNS Sumner in September 1999 located the wreckage and took photos of it. The wreckage included a 50-foot (15 m) long section of hangar bulkhead, two 25 mm anti-aircraft gun tubs, and a landing light array. The artifacts were at a depth of 17,000 feet (5,200 m).

On 18 October 2019, the wreck of Kaga was located by the Director of Undersea Operations for Vulcan Inc. Rob Kraft, David W. Jourdan and Naval History and Heritage Command historian Frank Thompson aboard RV Petrel. She sits upright at a depth of about 18,000 ft (5.4 km), buried up to the degaussing wires in the seafloor and with most of her superstructure and flight deck missing. The wreck is surrounded by a large debris field and has been heavily colonized by marine growth. The wreck of Akagi was found by the same crew two days later. A more extensive survey of the wreck was conducted by the EV Nautilus in September 2023.
