= Isozaki =

Isozaki (Japanese: 磯崎) is a Japanese surname. Notable people with the surname include:

- Arata Isozaki, Japanese architect
- Chitoshi Isozaki (1913–1993), Japanese fighter pilot
- Hiromi Isozaki (athlete) (born 1965), Japanese sprint athlete
- Hiromi Isozaki (born 1975), maiden name of Japanese footballer Hiromi Ikeda
- Keita Isozaki (born 1980), Japanese footballer
- Naomi Isozaki, Japanese Paralympic archer
- Yosuke Isozaki (born 1957), Japanese politician

== See also ==
- Isozaki Station, train station in Japan
- Isozaki Atea, building in Spain
