= Jisaku Okada =

Imperial Japanese Navy Captain (1897–1942)

- 岡田 次作
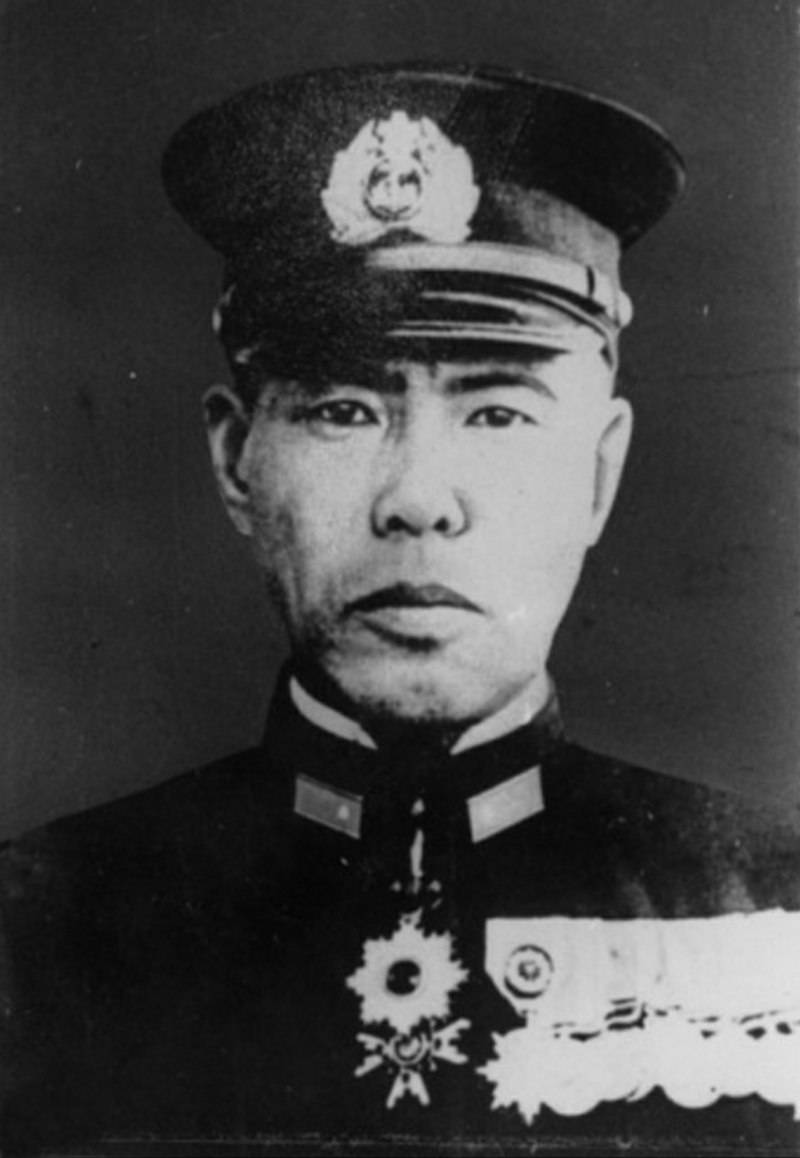
- Born: August 13, 1893; Kanazawa, Ishikawa, Empire of Japan
- Died: June 4, 1942 (aged 48); Pacific Ocean, near Midway Island
- Military career
- Allegiance: Empire of Japan
- Branch: Imperial Japanese Navy
- Service years: 1914–1942
- Rank: Rear Admiral (posthumous)
- Commands: 23rd Naval Air Group, Notoro, Ryūjō, Kaga
- Conflicts: World War II; Pacific War; Attack on Pearl Harbor; Bombing of Darwin; Battle of Midway †

Jisaku Okada (岡田 次作, Okada Jisaku; 1893 – June 4, 1942) was an Imperial Japanese Navy captain. During his career he was the commander of the seaplane tender Notoro and aircraft carrier Ryūjō. A couple of months before the start of the Second World War he was given the command of the Kaga. He was killed in action during the Battle of Midway when the ship was attacked by American dive bombers. Okada was posthumously promoted to rear admiral.
