= Satoru Ono =

Japanese flying ace

- 小野 了
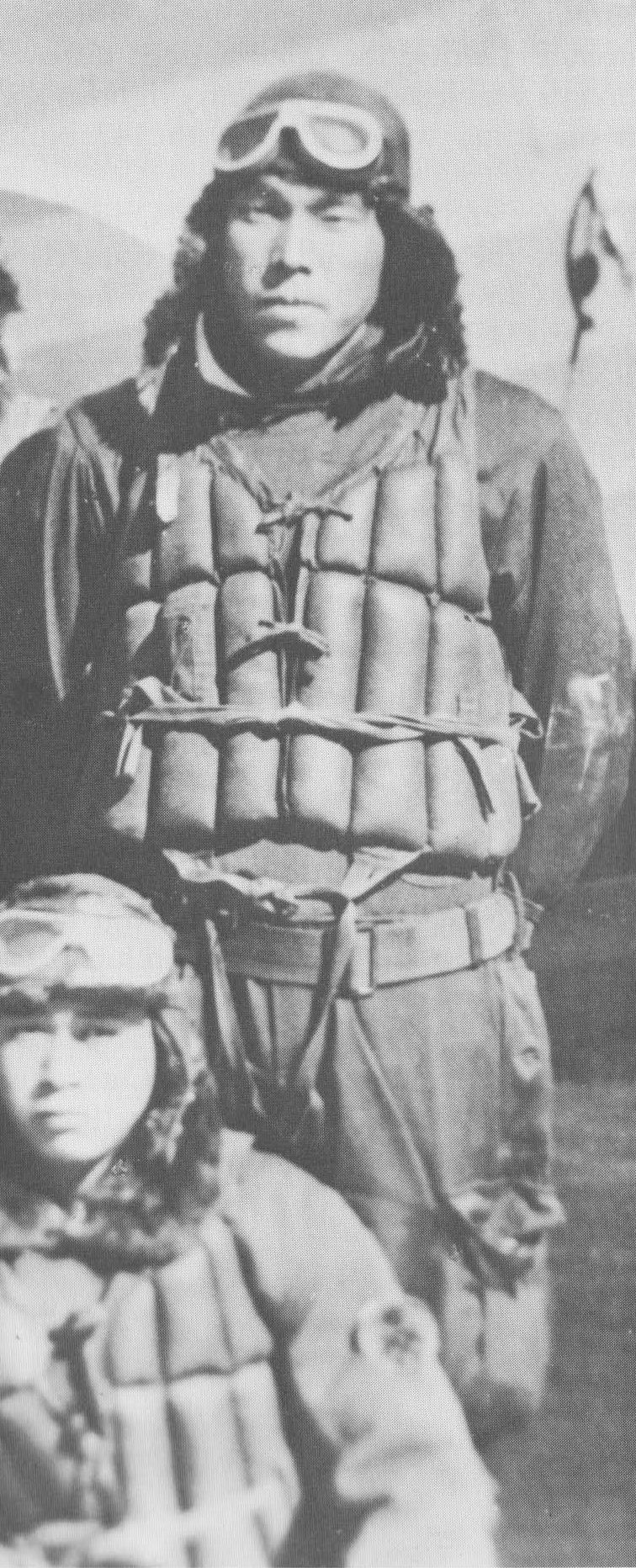
- Ono while serving on the aircraft carrier Kaga sometime between 1934 and 1938
- Born: 1915; Ōita, Japan
- Died: 2001 (aged 85–86)
- Military career
- Allegiance: Empire of Japan
- Branch: Imperial Japanese Navy Air Service (IJN)
- Service years: 1932–?
- Rank: Lieutenant junior grade
- Conflicts: Second Sino-Japanese War; World War II; Pacific War

Satoru Ono (小野 了, Ono Satoru; 1915–2001) was an officer and ace fighter pilot in the Imperial Japanese Navy (IJN) during the Second Sino-Japanese War and the Pacific theater of World War II. In aerial combat over China, the Pacific, and Japan, he was officially credited with destroying eight enemy aircraft. From 1943 until the end of World War II, Ono specialized in nocturnal interceptions of enemy bombers engaged in nighttime bombing raids. Ono survived World War II and died in 2001.
