= Isozaki Station =

Railway station in Hitachinaka, Ibaraki Prefecture, Japan

Isozaki Station 磯崎駅
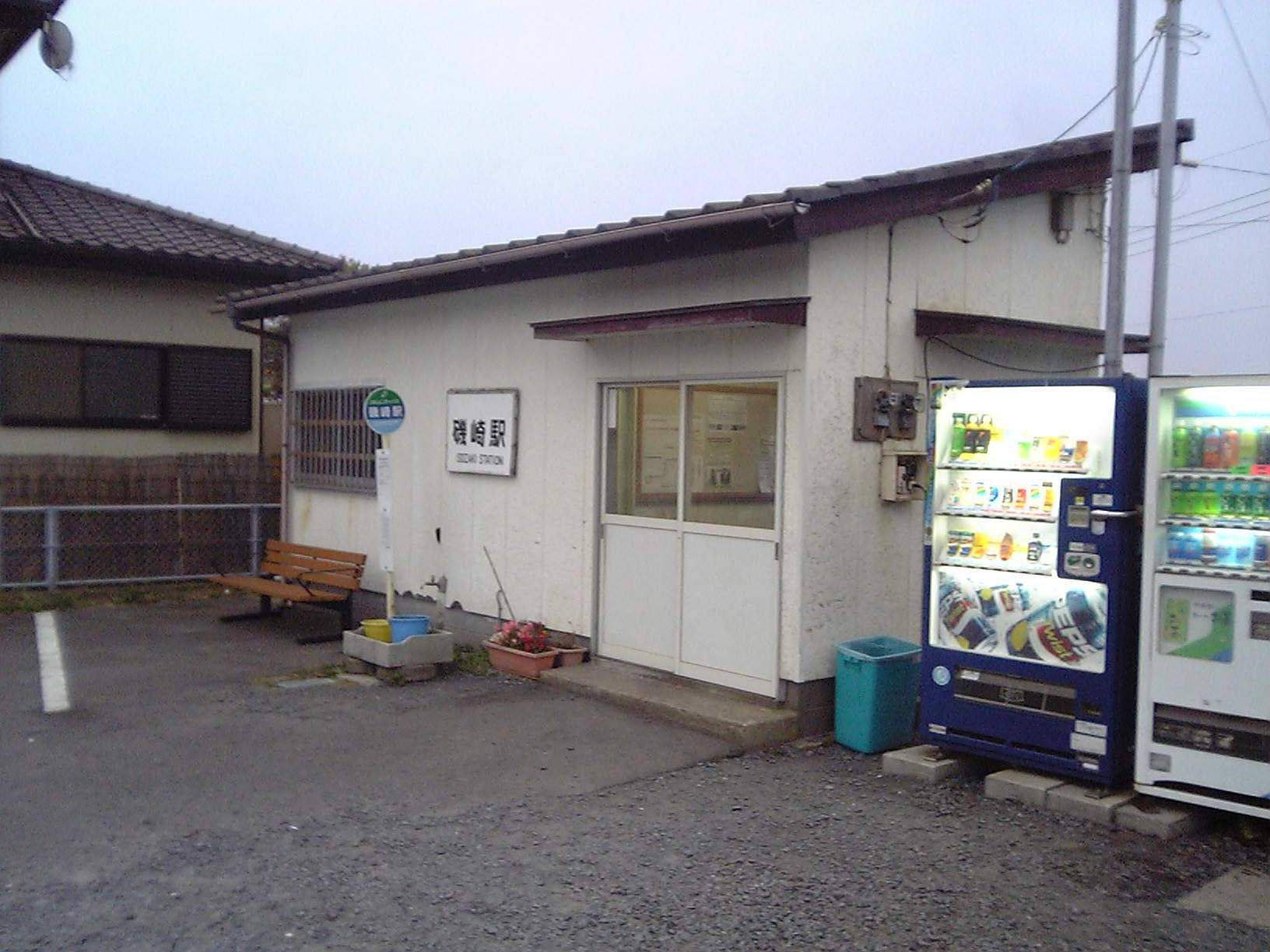
- Isozaki Station, October 2009

General information
- Location: Isozakicho, Hitachinaka-shi, Ibaraki-ken 311-1202; Japan
- Coordinates: 36.3780°N 140.6178°E
- Operator: Hitachinaka Seaside Railway
- Line: ■ Minato Line
- Distance: 13.3 km from Katsuta
- Platforms: 1 (1 side platform)
- Tracks: 1

Other information
- Status: Unstaffed
- Website: Official website

History
- Opened: 3 September 1924

Passengers
- FY2011: 83 daily

Services
Preceding station	Hitachinaka Seaside Railway	Following station
Minohamagakuen towards Katsuta	Minato Line	Ajigaura Terminus
Location
- Location within Ibaraki Prefecture Location within Japan

Isozaki Station (磯崎駅, Isozaki-eki) is a passenger railway station on the Minato Line in the city of Hitachinaka, Ibaraki, Japan, operated by the third-sector railway operator Hitachinaka Seaside Railway.

== Lines ==
Isozaki Station is served by the 14.3 km single-track Hitachinaka Seaside Railway Minato Line from Katsuta to Ajigaura, and lies 13.3 km from the starting point of the line at Katsuta.

== Station layout ==
The station is unstaffed and consists of a single curved side platform serving the single-track line.

== History ==
Isozaki Station opened on 3 September 1924.

== Passenger statistics ==
In fiscal 2011, the station was used by an average of 83 passengers daily.

== Surrounding area ==
- Isozaki Post Office
- National Institute of Information and Communications Technology Sunspot Research Center

== See also ==
- List of railway stations in Japan
