= Yoshio Fukui =

Japanese fighter pilot

- 福井 義男
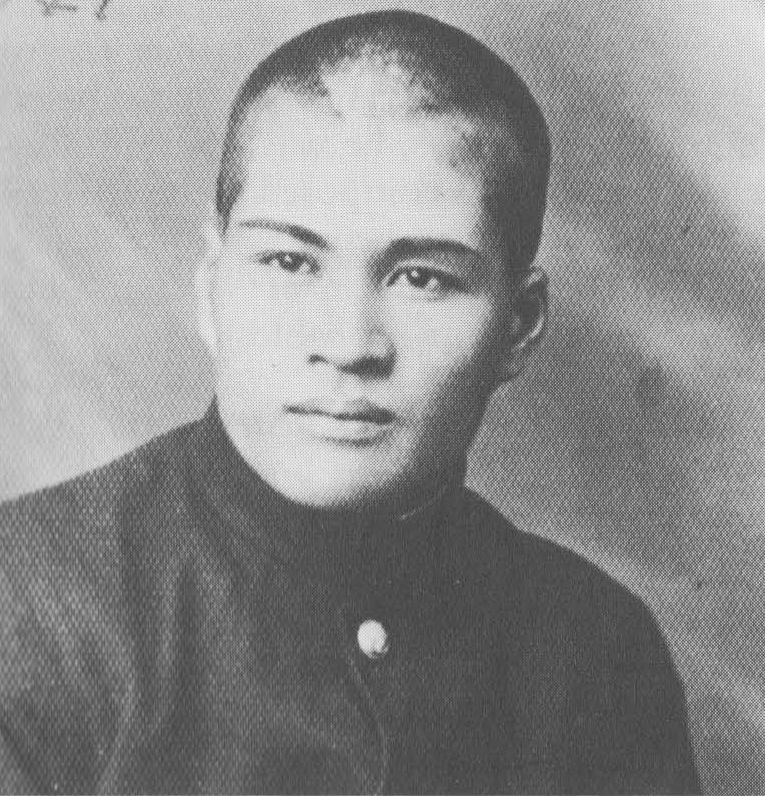
- Born: April 10, 1913; Kagawa Prefecture, Japan
- Died: June 30, 1989 (aged 76); Kagawa Prefecture, Japan
- Military career
- Allegiance: Empire of Japan
- Branch: Imperial Japanese Navy Air Service (IJN)
- Service years: 1931–1945
- Rank: Lieutenant
- Conflicts: Second Sino-Japanese War; World War II; Pacific War

Yoshio Fukui (福井 義男, Fukui Yoshio; April 10, 1913 – June 30, 1989) was an officer and ace fighter pilot in the Imperial Japanese Navy (IJN) during the Second Sino-Japanese War and the Pacific theater of World War II. In aerial combat over China and the Pacific, he was officially credited with destroying 11 enemy aircraft with four probables. Fukui survived World War II.
