= Kiichi Oda =

Japanese fighter pilot

- 小田 喜一
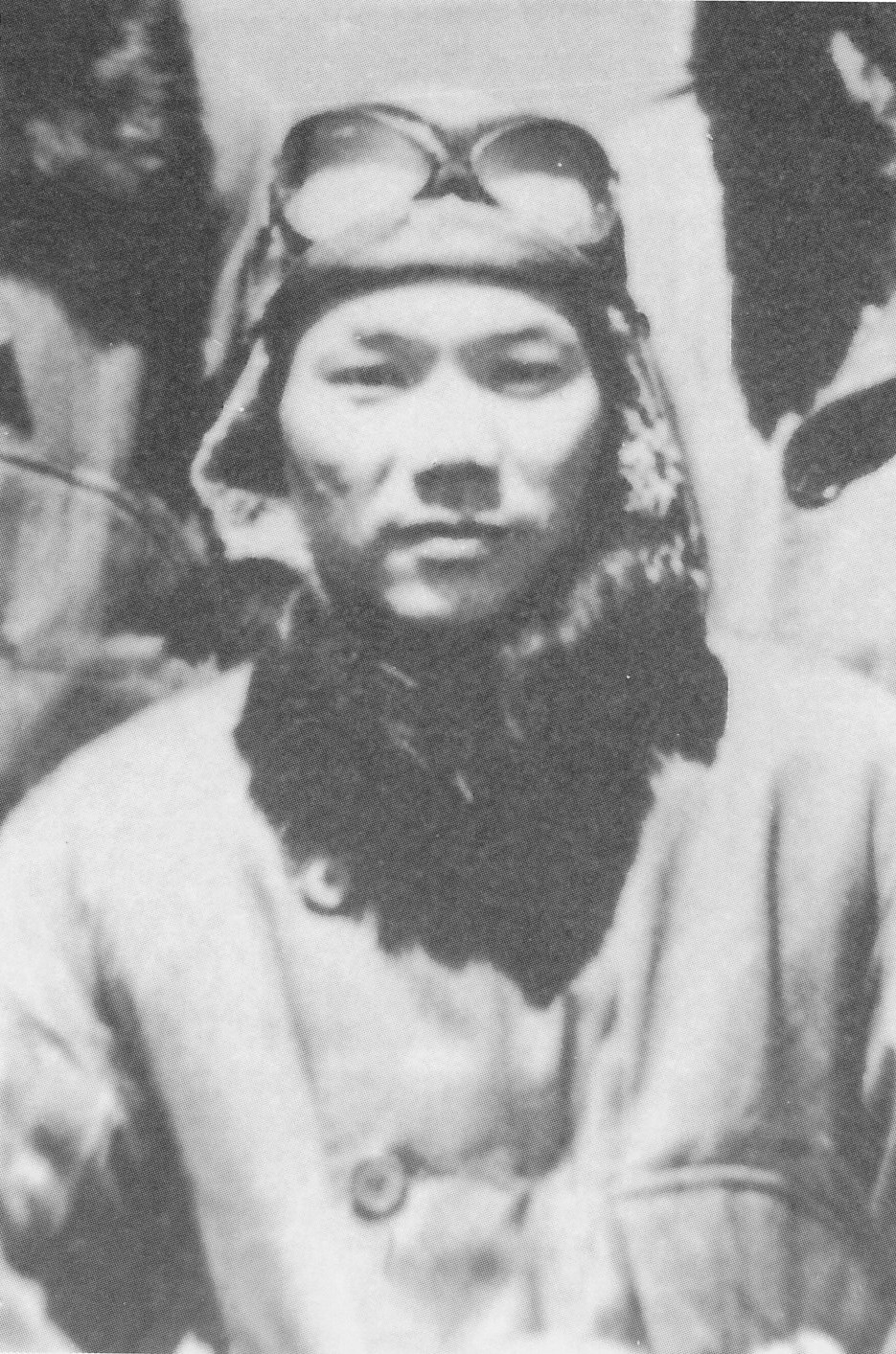
- Oda while assigned to the Sōryū in June 1942
- Born: 1913; Niigata Prefecture, Japan
- Died: 29 November 1944 (aged 30–31); Bonin Islands
- Military career
- Allegiance: Empire of Japan
- Branch: Imperial Japanese Navy Air Service (IJN)
- Service years: 1931–1944
- Rank: Ensign
- Conflicts: Second Sino-Japanese War; World War II; Pacific War

Kiichi Oda (小田 喜一; 1913 – 29 November 1944) was an officer and ace fighter pilot in the Imperial Japanese Navy (IJN) during the Second Sino-Japanese War and the Pacific theater of World War II. In aerial combat over China and the Pacific, he was officially credited with destroying nine enemy aircraft.

At the outbreak of the Pacific War, as a member of the aircraft carrier Sōryū's fighter group, Oda participated in the Attack on Pearl Harbor, the Indian Ocean Raid, and the Battle of Midway. After serving almost a year in the reserves in Japan, Oda returned to active service in April 1944 and saw front line aviation duty in the Mariana Islands and at Truk. At Truk in late 1944, Oda embarked on the submarine I-365 to return to mainland Japan. On 29 November 1944, the submarine was sunk by the US Navy submarine USS Scabbardfish in the Bonin Islands. Oda did not survive the sinking.
