= Chitoshi Isozaki =

Japanese flying ace

- 磯崎 千利
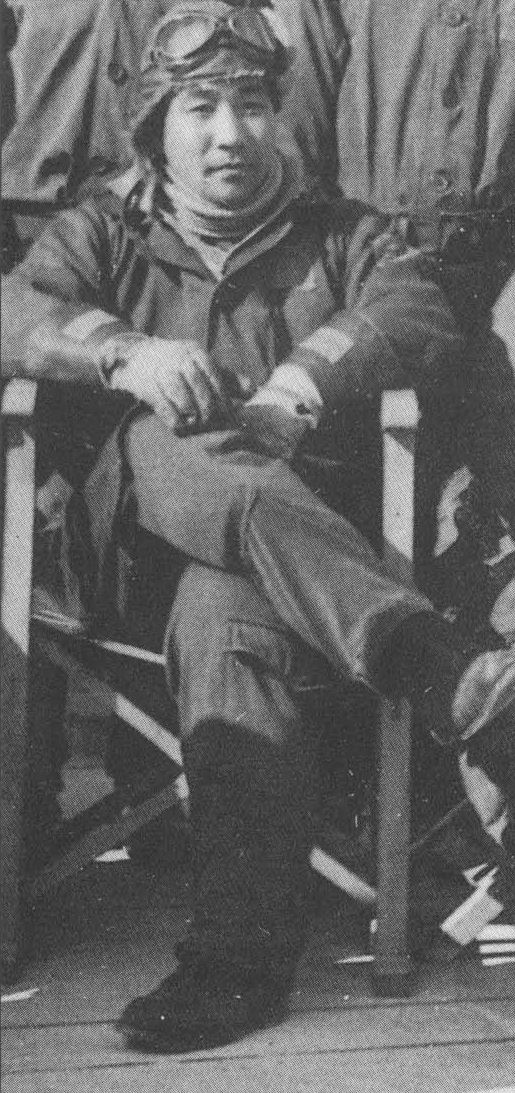
- Isozaki in 1944 or 1945 while assigned to Air Group 210 in Japan
- Born: 12 January 1913; Aichi Prefecture, Japan
- Died: 20 June 1993 (aged 80)
- Military career
- Allegiance: Japan
- Branch: Imperial Japanese Navy Air Service (IJN)
- Service years: 1932–1945
- Rank: Lieutenant
- Conflicts: Second Sino-Japanese War; World War II; Pacific War

Lieutenant Chitoshi Isozaki (磯崎 千利, Isozaki Chitoshi; 12 January 1913–20 June 1993) was an officer and ace fighter pilot in the Imperial Japanese Navy (IJN) during the Second Sino-Japanese War and the Pacific theater of World War II. In aerial combat over China, the Pacific, and Japan, he was officially credited with destroying twelve enemy aircraft. Isozaki survived World War II.
