= Cactus Air Force =

Allied air power on Guadalcanal in 1942

Coordinates: 9.4280°S 160.0550°E

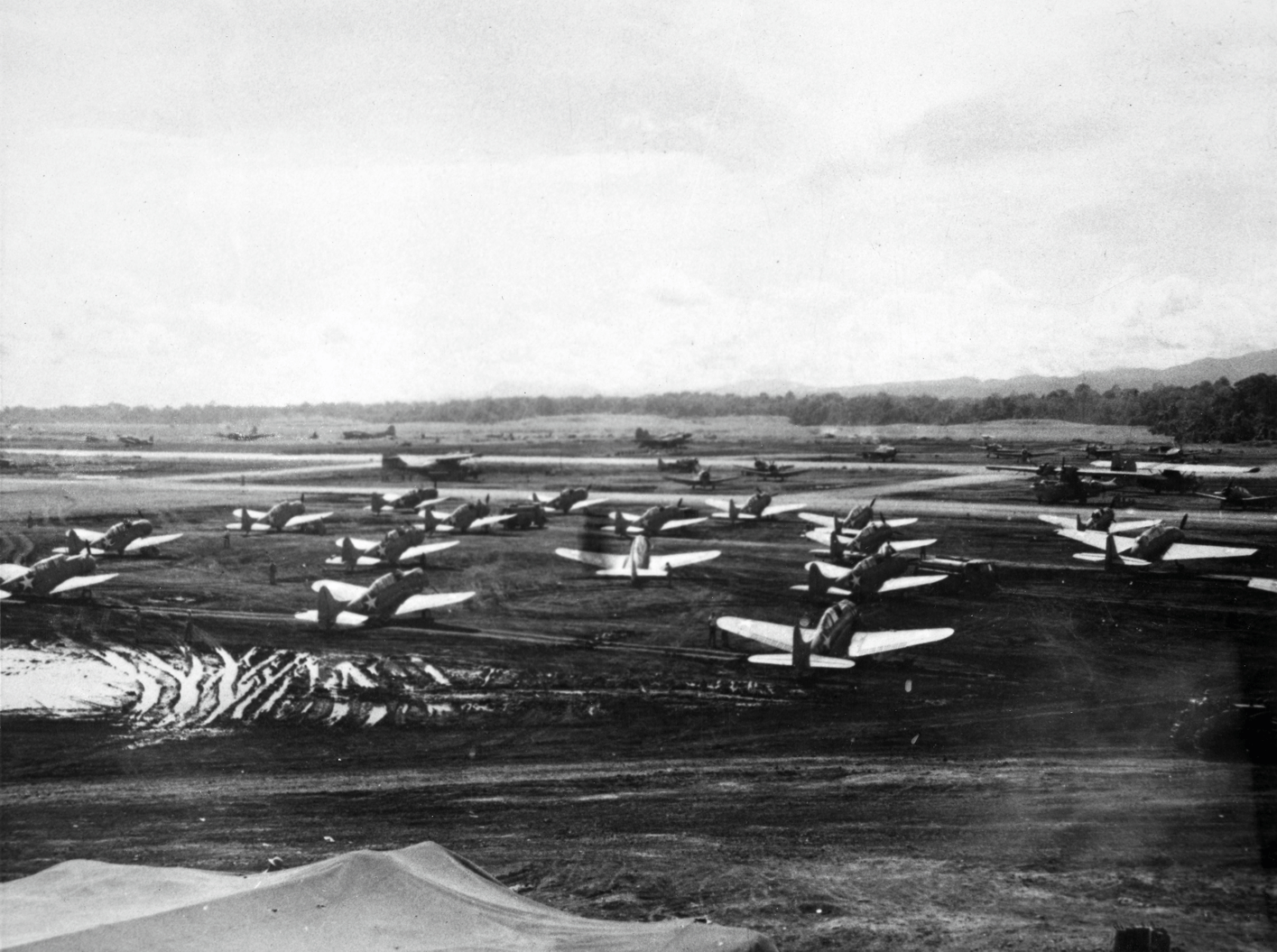
- Cactus Air Force aircraft crowd Henderson Field, Guadalcanal in October 1942
- Active: 20 August 1942 – April 1943
- Countries: United States; New Zealand
- Allegiance: Allies of World War II
- Branch: United States Army Air Forces; United States Marine Corps; United States Navy; Royal New Zealand Air Force
- Type: Ensemble air unit
- Role: Aerial warfare
- Garrison/HQ: Henderson Field, Guadalcanal, Solomon Islands
- Engagements: World War II

Commanders
- Notable commanders: Roy Geiger; Louis E. Woods; Francis P. Mulcahy

The Cactus Air Force was the ensemble of Allied air power assigned to the island of Guadalcanal from August 1942 until December 1942 during the most heavily contested phases of the Guadalcanal Campaign, particularly those operating from Henderson Field. The name is based on "Cactus", the Allied code name for the island. In 1943, the Cactus Air Force was absorbed into AirSols, a joint command of Allied air units in the Solomon Islands.

== Background ==
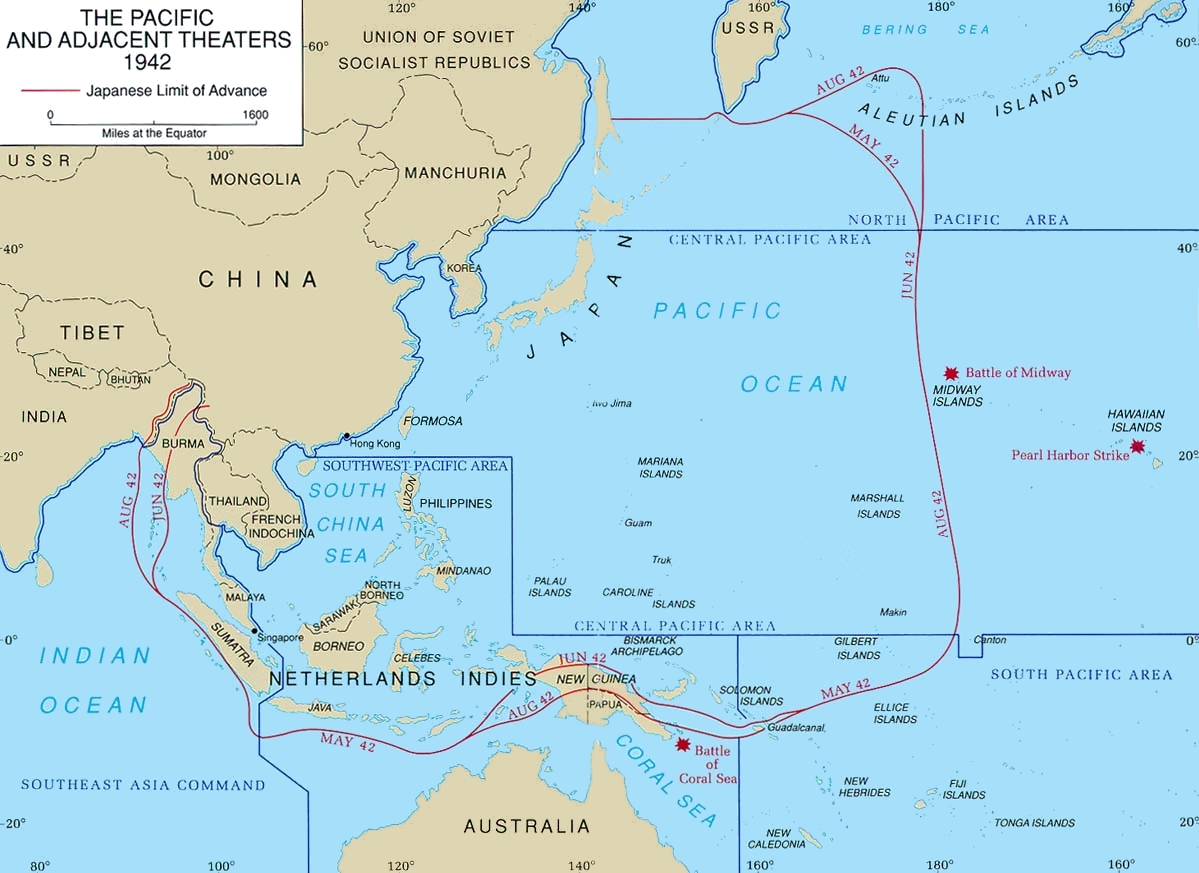
The Pacific Ocean area in August 1942. Guadalcanal is located in the lower right center of the map

On 7 December 1941, the Japanese attacked the U.S. Pacific fleet at Pearl Harbor, Hawaii. The attack crippled much of the U.S. Pacific battleship fleet and led to a state of war between the two nations. In launching this war, Japanese leaders sought to neutralize the American fleet, seize possessions rich in natural resources, and obtain strategic military bases to defend their far-flung empire. Japanese forces also attacked and took control of Hong Kong, the Philippines, Thailand, Malaya, Singapore, the Dutch East Indies, Wake Island, New Britain, and Guam.

Two attempts by the Japanese to extend their defensive perimeter in the south and central Pacific were thwarted in the Battle of the Coral Sea (May 1942) and the Battle of Midway (June 1942). These two strategic victories for the Allies provided an opportunity to take the initiative and launch a counter-offensive against the Japanese somewhere in the Pacific. The Allies chose the Solomon Islands, specifically the southern Solomon Islands of Guadalcanal, Tulagi, and Florida.

Allied strategists knew the Japanese Navy occupied Tulagi in May 1942 and constructed a seaplane base near there. During early July 1942, the Japanese Navy began constructing a significant airfield near Lunga Point on nearby Guadalcanal island. After completion, these bases would protect Japan's major base at Rabaul, threaten Allied supply and communication lines across the South Pacific to Australia and New Zealand, and establish a staging base for potential offensives against the New Hebrides, Fiji, Samoa, and New Caledonia.

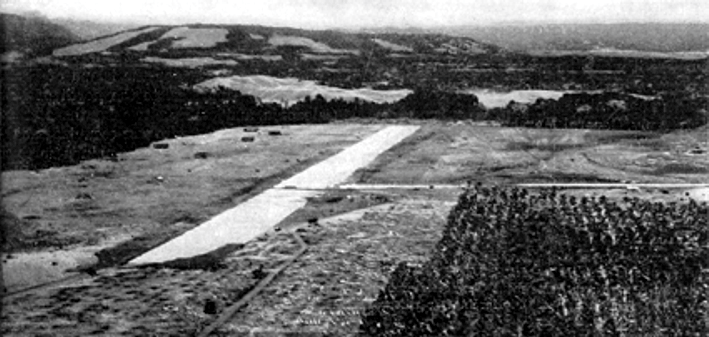
The airfield at Lunga Point on Guadalcanal under construction by Japanese in July 1942

The Allied plan to attack the southern Solomons was conceived by U.S. Navy Admiral Ernest King, Commander-in-Chief of the United States Fleet. King proposed the counter-offensive to deny the use of the southern Solomon Islands by the Japanese as bases to threaten the supply routes between the United States and Australia, and to use them as starting points for a campaign with the goal of isolating the new and major Japanese base at Rabaul while supporting the Allied New Guinea campaign. All of this had the eventual goal of opening the way for the U.S. to retake the Philippines. American Admiral Chester Nimitz, the Allied Commander-in-Chief for all forces in the Pacific, created the South Pacific theater of operations, with Vice Admiral Robert L. Ghormley placed in command on 19 June 1942, to direct the Allied offensive in the Solomons.

On 7 August 1942, the First Marine Division landed on Tulagi and Guadalcanal at Lunga Point, capturing the uncompleted Japanese airfield, and marking the first counter-offensive by the Allies in the Pacific Theater. The Allies continued construction on the airfield immediately using captured Japanese equipment. On 12 August, the airfield was renamed Henderson Field, for Major Lofton R. Henderson, killed during the Battle of Midway, the first Marine Corps pilot killed during the battle. By 18 August, Henderson Field was ready for operation.

== Henderson Field ==
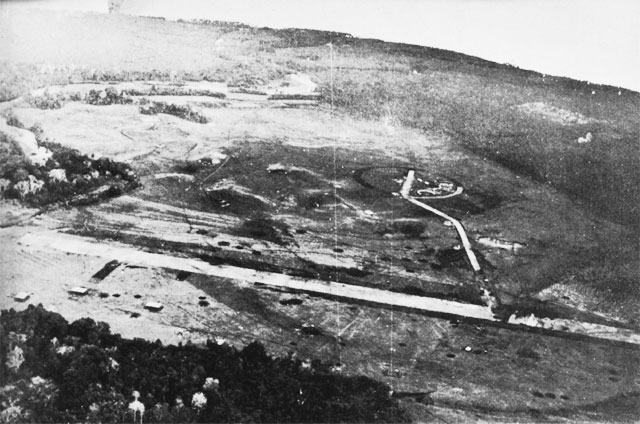
Aerial view of Henderson Field on Guadalcanal, 7 August 1942

Immediately after landing on Guadalcanal, Marines from the 1st Engineer Battalion worked around the clock using captured Japanese heavy equipment to complete construction of the airfield. The first plane to land was a US Navy PBY Catalina that touched down on August 12 to assess the condition of the field. At that time the field was 2600ft long, good enough for fighters but still too short and soft for bombers. Three days later the first Seabee unit arrived with a Carryall which dramatically sped up construction. The field was declared ready for flight operations on August 18. As the first planes arrived, Henderson Field could barely be described as an airfield. It was an irregular blob cut out of the island growth, half-in and half-out of a coconut grove, with a short runway, and few revetments to protect the aircraft from shrapnel. Upon landing on Henderson Field on 4 September, Commanding Officer of Marine Aircraft Group 25, Colonel W. Fiske Marshall described the scene -- "looked like a Doré drawing of hell."

The runway was a northwest to southeast running, 2,400-foot (730 m) long gravel surface with an extra 1,000 feet (300 m) of Marston Mat frequently pockmarked with craters from Japanese artillery and naval gunfire. The strip was in such poor condition that it caused as many losses to aircraft as enemy action. In the heat, the field was a bowl of black dust which fouled the warplanes' engines; during rain, the airfield quickly turned muddy, miring planes in liquid muck. Major Marion Carl described it as "...the only place on Earth you could stand up to your knees in mud and still get dust in your eyes." The heavier SBD dive bombers had it the worst, since their hard rubber tires, designed for aircraft carrier landings and take-offs, ripped up the runways like plowshares. Wooden wheels were experimented with, but these did not fare any better. The runway was extended and widened several times during the long Guadalcanal campaign, and it was 3,800 feet (1,200 m) long and 150 feet (46 m) wide by 4 September.

Henderson Field was also very close to the thinly-held lines of the U.S. First Marine Division, so security was always a concern. There were no fuel trucks, aircraft hangars, or repair buildings. Damaged aircraft were cannibalized for spare parts, and with no bomb hoists, all aircraft munitions had to be hand-loaded onto the warplanes. Fuel, always critically low, had to be hand pumped out of 55 gallon drums. After the arrival of fuel trucks, aviation gasoline still had to be hand-pumped into the trucks.

On 9 September 1942, the U.S. 6th Naval Construction Battalion (SeaBees) opened up a second runway about 1 mile (1.6 km) to the east of Henderson Field's original runway. This new runway, called "Fighter 1", consisted of tamped-down sod, and it was about 4,600 feet (1,400 m) long and 300 feet (91 m) wide. The Marine fighter squadrons operated out of Fighter 1, while the rest of the aircraft operating out of Henderson Field continued to use the original runway, referred to as "Bomber Field No. 1".

Henderson Field's facilities improved around 15 November, after it was officially a Marine Corps Air Base. Proper runways were installed using shipped-in ground-up coral, since the local coral was deemed rotten and slushy.

== Living conditions ==
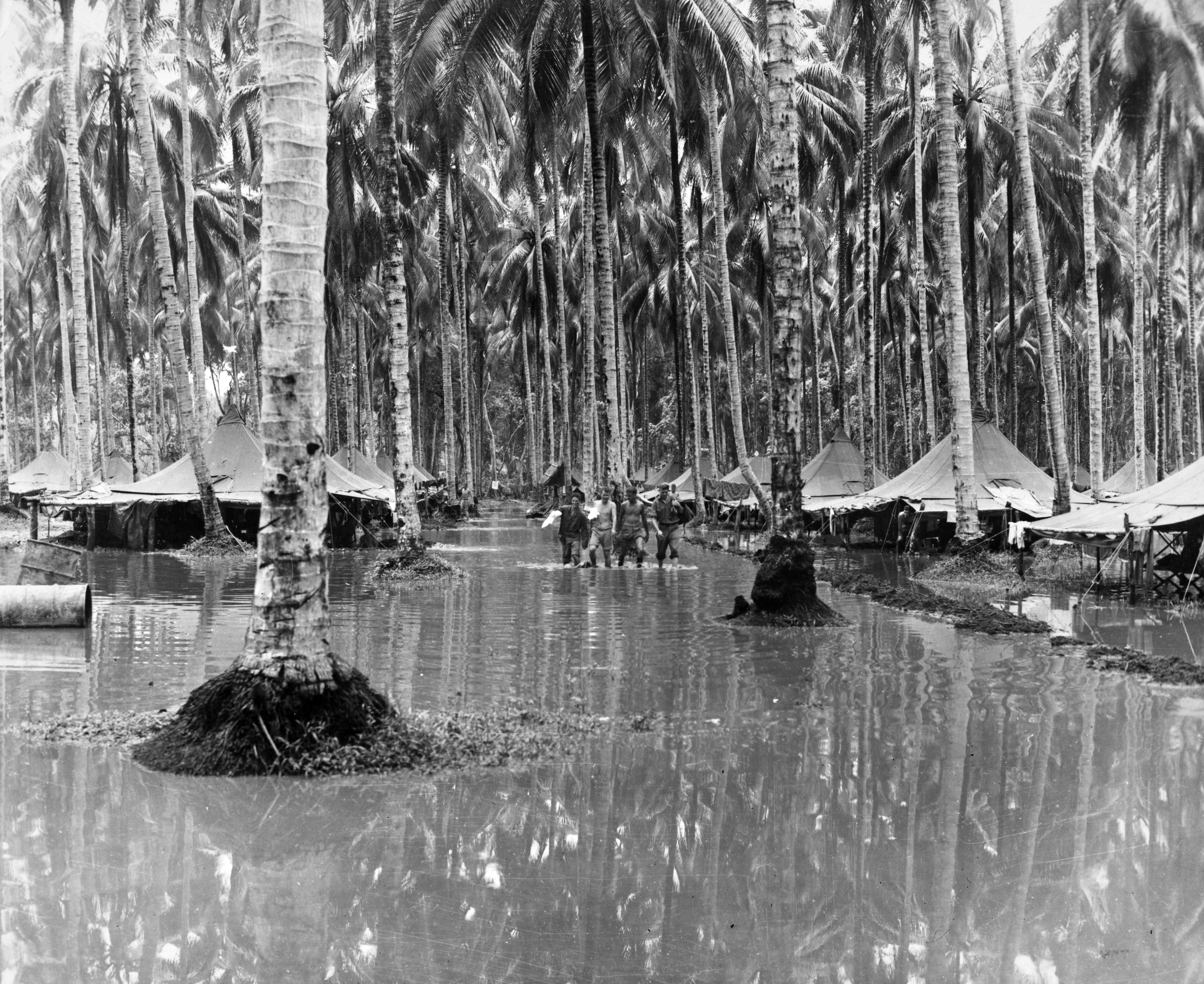
A flooded coconut grove near the airfield the air wing Marines called home

Living conditions on Guadalcanal were some of the most difficult faced by Marine aviation. Pilots and mechanics lived in mud-floored tents in a flooded coconut plantation called "Mosquito Grove." Most contracted tropical diseases such as malaria, dysentery, dengue fever, or fungal infections.

The misery was accompanied by mortal danger. The airfield was bombed nearly every day around noon by Mitsubishi G4M "Betty" bombers flying at 20,000 feet (6,100 m) in a perfect "Vee formation" escorted by fighter planes. It was frequently shelled as well, by Japanese artillery in the day and Japanese warships at night. The worst night of bombardment was on 13–14 October 1942—two Japanese battleships fired more than 700 heavy shells into Henderson Field, providing cover for the Japanese Navy's landing of Imperial Marines and army reinforcements further west on Guadalcanal. The bombardment killed six CAF pilots.

== Commanders ==
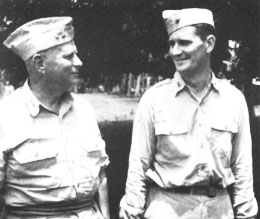
General Roy Geiger (left) and Major Joe Foss, the top fighter ace on Guadalcanal

From the time of the first Marine squadron landed on 20 August until 25 August, there was no commanding officer for Marine air, which instead reported directly to General Vandegrift. The Marines had not designated an air operations commander, the Army already had a squadron present and the field acquired the air of a naval base after they were promised to certain naval units. The first Marine commander was Colonel William W. Wallace, but he retained command temporarily. Cactus Air Force technically was under the command of Rear Admiral John S. McCain, who commanded all land based Allied aircraft in the South Pacific. Vandegrift and his operational commanders, however, exercised local command over the Allied aircraft operating out of Henderson Field.

On 3 September 1942, the fortunes of the beleaguered aviators changed with the arrival of Brigadier General Roy Geiger on board the first Marine Aircraft Group 25 plane to land on the island, an R4D Skytrain. As the "Commander, Aircraft, Guadalcanal" (ComAirCACTUS) and the 1st Marine Aircraft Wing, Geiger established his headquarters in a wooden Japanese pagoda on a hill about 200 yards (180 m) from the airfield. Through his energy, example, and sheer force of personality, he raised the collective spirits of the squadron's survivors. He was described as "...curt, cold, and some said ruthless....he was determined to squeeze the ultimate ounce of performance from men and machines". During his time in command, press-releases said there was a "sense of desperation but never defeatism," Ultimately, the strain of command and harsh living conditions seriously fatigued, both mentally and physically, the 57-year-old Geiger. Geiger turned over the command on 7 November to his Chief of Staff, Brigadier General Louis E. Woods.

Brigadier Woods, a 21-year aviation veteran, commanded the Cactus fliers during the lowest point of the campaign. He quickly transformed from a "kindly colonel to a blood thirsty brigadier general." The day after Christmas, Woods turned the Cactus command to Brigadier General Francis P. Mulcahy, Commanding General of the 2nd Marine Aircraft Wing.

== Japanese ==
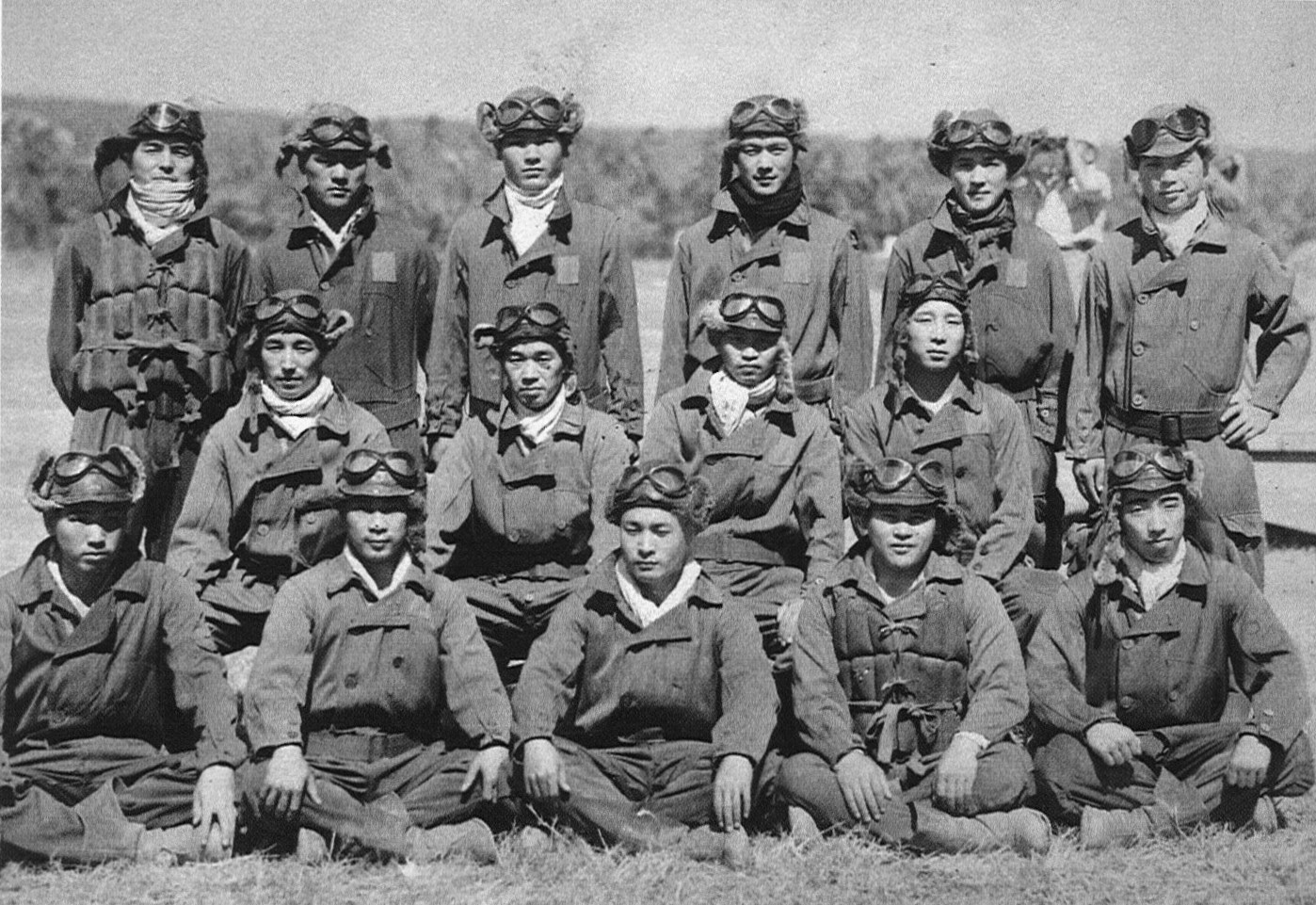
Enlisted pilots of the Tainan Kōkūtai pose at Lae in 1942. Several of these aviators would be among the top Japanese aces, including Saburō Sakai (middle row, second from left), and Hiroyoshi Nishizawa (standing, first on left). These pilots fought with Allied fighter pilots during the Battle of Guadalcanal and the Solomon Islands campaign.

The majority of the Japanese aircraft engaged by the Cactus Air Force were from Imperial Japanese Navy air units. On 7 August, during the Guadalcanal campaign, 5th Air Attack Force, under Rear Admiral Sadayoshi Yamada, operated from Rabaul, New Britain, and Lae, Papua New Guinea, and were responsible for naval air operations in eastern New Guinea and the Solomon Islands. The 5th was a hybrid organization consisting of attached units from the 25th Air Flotilla, and reported to the 11th Air Fleet (also called the "Base Air Force"), under Nishizo Tsukahara. On the morning of 7 August, the 5th's air strength consisted of 39 fighters, 32 medium bombers, 16 dive bombers, and 17 seaplanes, including the 15 seaplane aircraft at Tulagi destroyed in the initial Allied air strikes during the landings on Tulagi and Guadalcanal.

The 5th's principal bomber unit was the 4th Air Group operating Mitsubishi G4M Type 1 "Betty" bombers. Twenty-four of the fighter aircraft in the 5th belonged to the Tainan Kōkūtai under Captain Masahisa Saito. The Tainan contained some of the top-scoring Japanese fighter aces, and flew the A6M2 Zero fighter. With 55 pilots and 24 aircraft, only the most experienced and able Tainan pilots were allowed to consistently participate in combat operations. The dive bombers (Aichi D3A1 "Vals") and the rest of the fighters (A6M3 Zeros) belonged to the 2nd Air Group. Most of the dive bombers were lost during the 7 and 8 August strikes on the Allied landing forces. Also on 7 and 8 August, the Misawa Air Group of the 6th Air Attack Force (also called the 26th Air Flotilla) under Vice Admiral Seigo Yamagata from Tinian with 27 Type 1 bombers joined the 5th Air Attack Force at Rabaul. Around the same time, Admiral Tsukahara moved from Tinian to Rabaul to supervise air operations against Allied forces around Guadalcanal.

The 4th and Misawa Air Groups took heavy losses during attacks on the Allied landing fleets off Guadalcanal on 7 and 8 August, losing 24 bombers and 153 crewmen killed while the Tainan Air Group lost four Zeros and four pilots. Until reinforcements could arrive, the 5th Air Attack Group was unable to continue attacking Marine positions on Guadalcanal, giving the U.S. time to prepare the captured airfield at Lunga Point uninterrupted by air attack. On 20 August 19, Type 1s from the Kisarazu Air Group of the 6th Air Attack Force arrived at Kavieng. On 2 September, ten Type 1s from the Chitose Air Group of the 24th Air Flotilla joined them at Kavieng. Both groups participated in subsequent bombing raids on Guadalcanal. Thirteen Zeros and pilots from the 6th Air Group joined the 2nd Air Group at Rabaul on 31 August, flying combat missions over Guadalcanal on 11 September.

From 1 October until the end of the war, the 11th Air Fleet was commanded by Jinichi Kusaka, also located at Rabaul. Some notable pilots flying with the 11th Air Fleet included Hiroyoshi Nishizawa and Junichi Sasai.

A force of Japanese seaplanes called the R-Area Air Force was created on 28 August under Rear Admiral Takatsugu Jojima, and operated from Rabaul as well as forward operating bases at Buin, the Shortland Islands, and Rekata Bay, Santa Isabel. The R-Area aircraft came from the four squadrons assigned to the Japanese seaplane tenders Kamikawa Maru, Chitose, Sanyo Maru, and Sanuki Maru. The R-Area Air Force mainly provided cover for Japanese convoys delivering troops and supplies to Guadalcanal, conducted reconnaissance missions around the Solomon Islands' area, and occasionally attacked Henderson Field. Also, air units from Japan's Combined Fleet's aircraft carriers, including Shōkaku, Junyō, Zuikaku, and Ryūjō, either operating from land bases with the 11th Air Fleet, or operating from the carriers, engaged Cactus Air Force aircraft during the Guadalcanal campaign.

== Operations ==
=== August ===
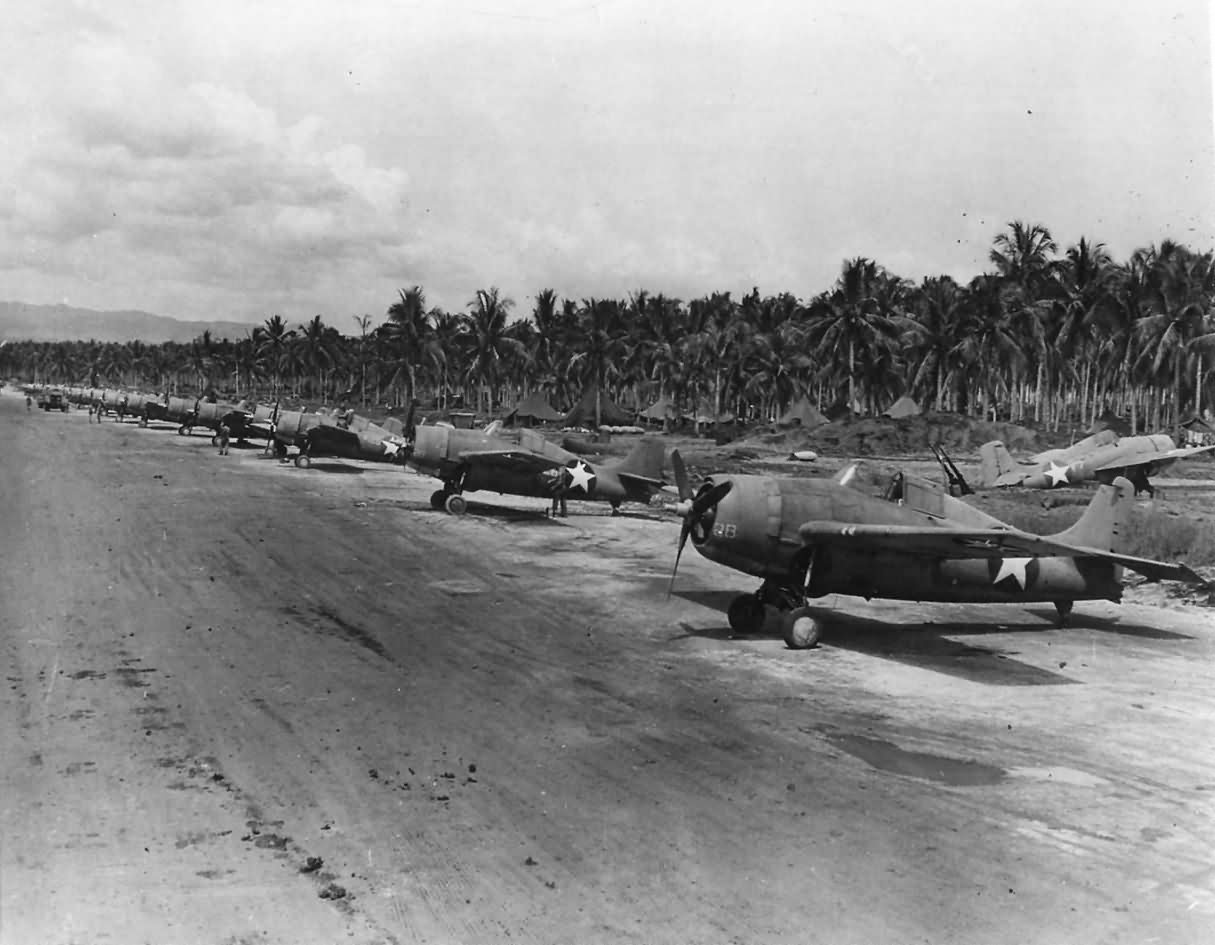
F4F-4 Wildcats on Guadalcanal

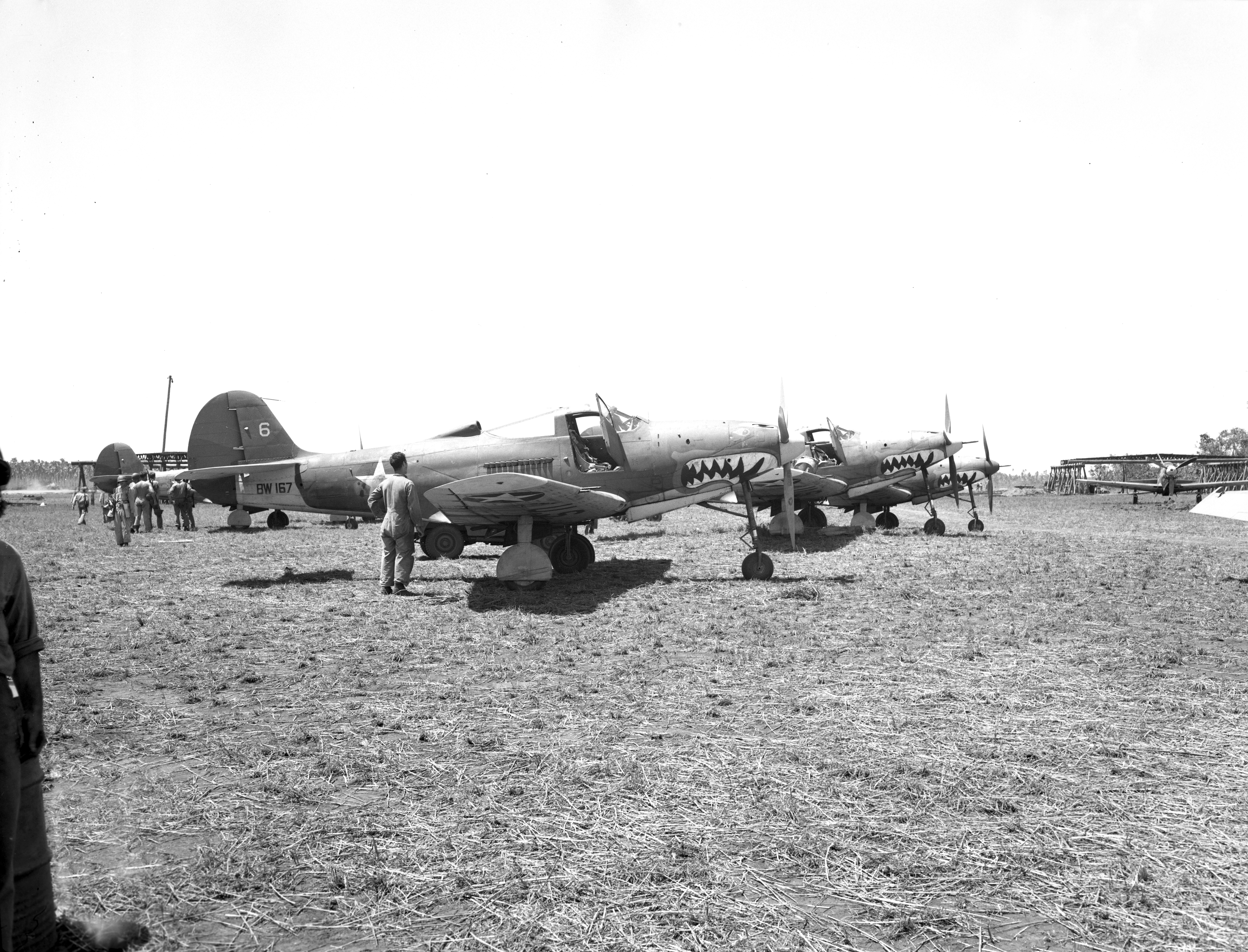
P-400s from the 67th FS, USAAF on Guadalcanal in August

On August 20, the first Marine aircraft landed at Henderson Field. Part of Marine Aircraft Group 23 flying from the escort aircraft carrier USS Long Island, they included 18 x F4F Wildcat fighter planes of VMF-223 led by Major John L. Smith and 12 x SBD Dauntless dive bombers of VMSB-232 led by Lt. Colonel Richard Mangrum. These warplanes conducted combat missions the following day.

They were joined on August 22 by the U.S. Army's 67th Pursuit Squadron under Major Dale Brannon, with five Army P-400s (an "export" version of the P-39); and on August 24, by 11 x SBD dive bombers from the aircraft carrier USS Enterprise because they were unable to land on their carrier, which was damaged in the Battle of the Eastern Solomons. At the end of August, these warplanes were joined by 19 more Wildcats from VMF-224 under Major Robert E. Galer, and a dozen more SBD dive bombers from VMSB-231, also part of the Marine Air Group 23. This varied assortment of Army, Marine, and Navy pilots and warplanes were the foundation of the Cactus Air Force.

The first air-to-air combat for Cactus Air Forces took place on August 21 and ended with mixed results. Japanese Zeros from the Tainan Air Group on a bomber escort mission (the bombers were searching for American carriers south of Guadalcanal) passed over Henderson Field on their way back to Rabaul, and six of these were met by four Cactus Air Force F4F Wildcats at 14,000 feet (4,300 m). Major Smith claimed the first air-to-air victory for the CAF, but two other pilots crashed while landing their damaged aircraft, with both of the Wildcats deemed a total loss except for salvaged parts. The Japanese suffered no losses. That same night, an SBD Dauntless blew a tire on take-off, causing it to ground loop and crash for another aircraft loss.

On 24 August, during the naval Battle of the Eastern Solomons between aircraft carrier forces of Japan and the U.S. east of the Solomon Islands, Japanese Vice Admiral Chuichi Nagumo sent the Imperial Japanese Navy (IJN) light carrier Ryūjō ahead of the main Japanese warship force to send an aircraft attack force against Henderson Field. The Ryūjō mission was likely in response to a request from Nishizo Tsukahara, the naval commander at Rabaul, for help from the Japanese combined fleet in neutralizing Henderson Field. At 12:20 and 200 miles (320 km) northeast of Guadalcanal, the Ryūjō launched six "Kate" bombers and 15 A6M Zero fighters to attack Henderson Field in conjunction with an attack by 24 "Betty" bombers and 14 Zero fighters from Rabaul. Unknown to the Ryūjō force, the Rabaul aircraft encountered severe weather, and returned to their base at 11:30am. The Ryūjō's aircraft arrived over Henderson Field at 14:23pm, and tangled with 14 Marine Wildcats and four Army P-400s while bombing the airfield. In the resulting engagement, three Kates, three Zeros, and three Marine fighters were shot down... but no damage was done to Henderson Field. Two Marine pilots were killed in the engagement as well as eight Japanese aircrewmen. All of these Japanese aircraft were eventually lost because, while they were attacking Henderson Field, the Ryūjō was sunk by aircraft from the aircraft carrier USS Saratoga, forcing the Japanese aircraft to ditch upon returning to the previous location of their carrier.

On 31 August, the aircraft carrier USS Saratoga was torpedoed by a Japanese submarine. Returning to Pearl Harbor for drydock repairs, most of the Saratoga's aircraft and aircrewmen remained behind at Espiritu Santo. Admiral McCain planned to send some of these aircraft to reinforce the Cactus Air Force at Guadalcanal.

=== September ===
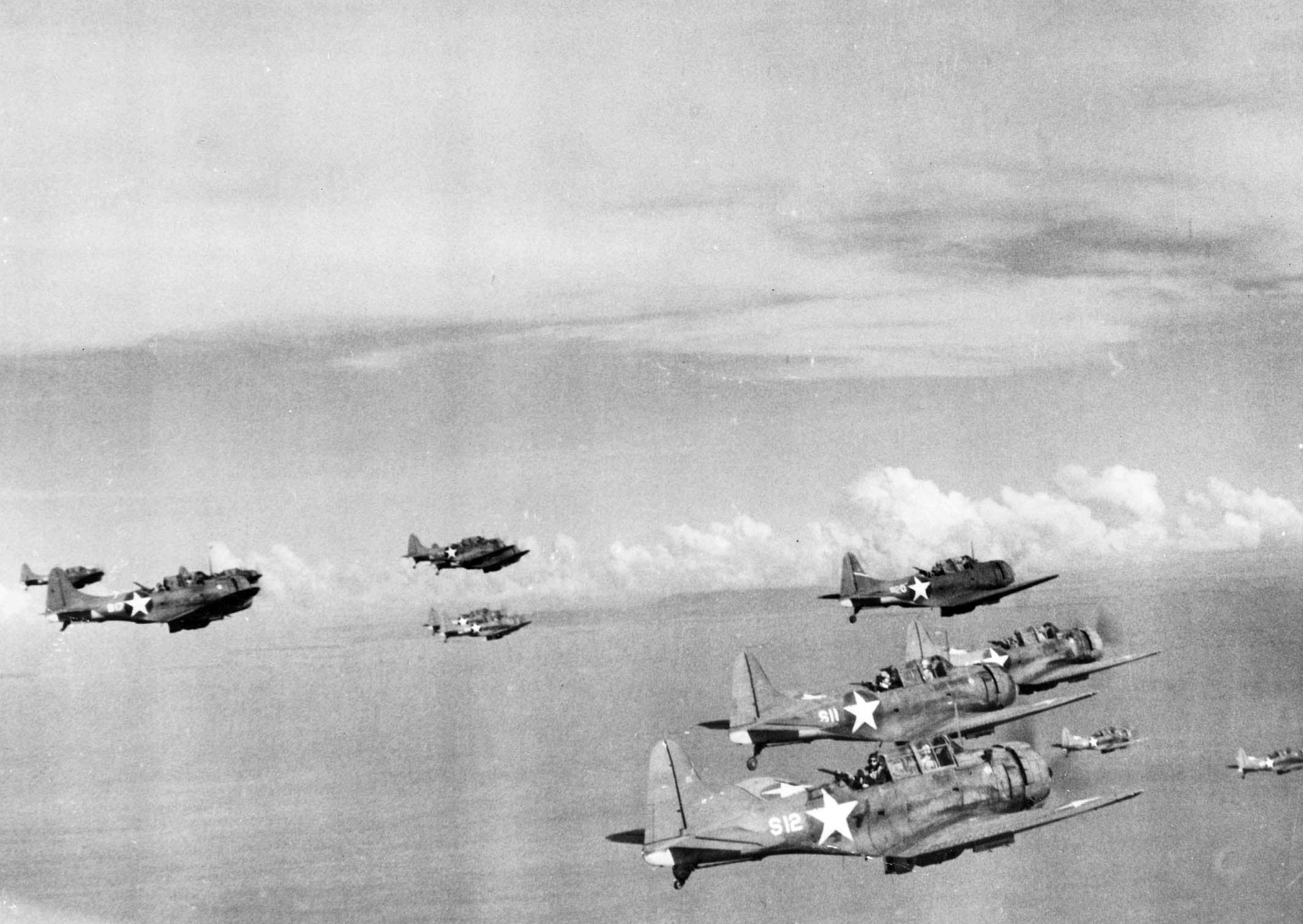
Shore-based Enterprise SBDs en route to the Japanese seaplane base at Rekata Bay

On 2 September, the U.S. Marine 3rd Defense Battalion began operating an air search radar at Henderson Field, which, along with reports from the coastwatchers, helped provide early warning of incoming Japanese warplanes.

By 3 September, the day of Geiger's arrival, the CAF consisted of only 64 flyable airplanes. Due to the heavy losses that the CAF had sustained, Admiral McCain decided to immediately deploy the USS Saratoga's fighter squadrons to Guadalcanal. On 4 September 24 F4Fs of VF-5 flew from Espiritu Santo to Henderson Field.

From 1 September through 8 September the Japanese aviation units at Rabaul concentrated on providing air cover for Japanese Army forces operating along the Kokoda Track on New Guinea, during the Kokoda Track campaign. On 9 September the Japanese resumed air operations against Henderson Field, with the objective of destroying the CAF and isolating the American forces on Guadalcanal.

Between 21 August and 11 September, the Japanese raided Guadalcanal a total of ten times, losing 31 aircraft destroyed and seven more heavily damaged, primarily due to the defensive efforts of CAF fighter planes. Most of the Japanese aircrewmen in the destroyed aircraft were killed. During this same time, the CAF Marine Corps fighter squadrons lost 27 aircraft with nine pilots killed.

On 12 September 25 Bettys and 15 Zeros from Rabaul raided Henderson Field. Alerted by the coastwatcher Donald Kennedy, and by the radar at Henderson Field, 20 Wildcat fighters from the Marine and Navy fighter squadrons took off to intercept this raid. In the resulting battle, two Betty bombers were shot down by Marine anti-aircraft fire, and four Bettys and one fighter were shot down by the Wildcats. One U.S. Navy pilot died attempting to land his damaged fighter back at Henderson Field following the action.

That night the field was shelled by the Japanese cruiser Sendai and three destroyers in support of the Japanese Army attacks on the Lunga perimeter – the first night of the Battle of Edson's Ridge. This shelling killed two pilots from VMSB-232 and one pilot from VMSB-231, but it did not damage any aircraft or the airfield.

On 13 September 18 Wildcats arrived at Henderson Field from the carriers USS Hornet and USS Wasp. The morning of this same day, Tsukahara sent a reconnaissance mission of two C5M2 "Babs" aircraft escorted by nine Zeros to find out if the Japanese Army had captured Henderson Field during the night. The Zeros tangled with Cactus Air Force fighters from VMF-223, VMF-224, and VF-5, losing four Zeros along with their pilots. The CAF lost four fighters, two in combat and two to accidents with two CAF pilots killed. An afternoon raid the same day by 27 Bettys and 12 Zeros attacked Henderson Field at 14:00 and again resulted in intense clashes with the Cactus defenders. In the skirmish, two Betty bombers were lost and two were heavily damaged, with three crewmen killed and six captured. Two Wildcats were lost, one each from VMF-212 and VF-5, with both pilots killed. On that same day, two R Area floatplane Zeros from Rekata Bay swept over Lunga Point and shot down a scout plane SBD from VMSB-231, killing both of its crewmen. Another CAF scout SBD from VS-3 ditched in the ocean that afternoon during their search patrol, and both crewmen were lost. Later that day, 12 VS-3 SBDs and six VT-8 TBF Avenger torpedo planes arrived at Henderson Field as reinforcements.

On 14 September, the R Area force attacked Henderson throughout the day with a total of 24 float fighters and bombers, losing eight of them with no losses to the CAF. A fighter sweep by seven 2nd Air Group Zeros from Rabaul also attacked Lunga that day, losing one aircraft and pilot. A Japanese reconnaissance aircraft was also shot down over Guadalcanal that day. The only CAF loss was one VMF-223 Wildcat that wrecked on takeoff, seriously injuring the pilot.

From 15 to 27 September, bad weather over the Bismarck Islands caused a lull in the air campaign over Guadalcanal, with no Japanese air raids. During this period, both sides reinforced their respective air units. The Japanese delivered 85 fighters and bombers to their air units at Rabaul, while the Americans brought in 23 fighters and bombers to Henderson Field. On 20 September, the Japanese counted 117 total aircraft at Rabaul while the CAF tallied 71 aircraft at Henderson Field.

=== October ===
On the evening of October 13-14, the Japanese Battleships Kongō and Haruna sailed into Ironbottom Sound and proceeded to shell Henderson Field with 14-inch shells. After the 90-minute bombardment, 41 Americans were killed, and the Cactus Air Force possessed only five SBDs and 7 Wildcats that were still operational.

=== November ===
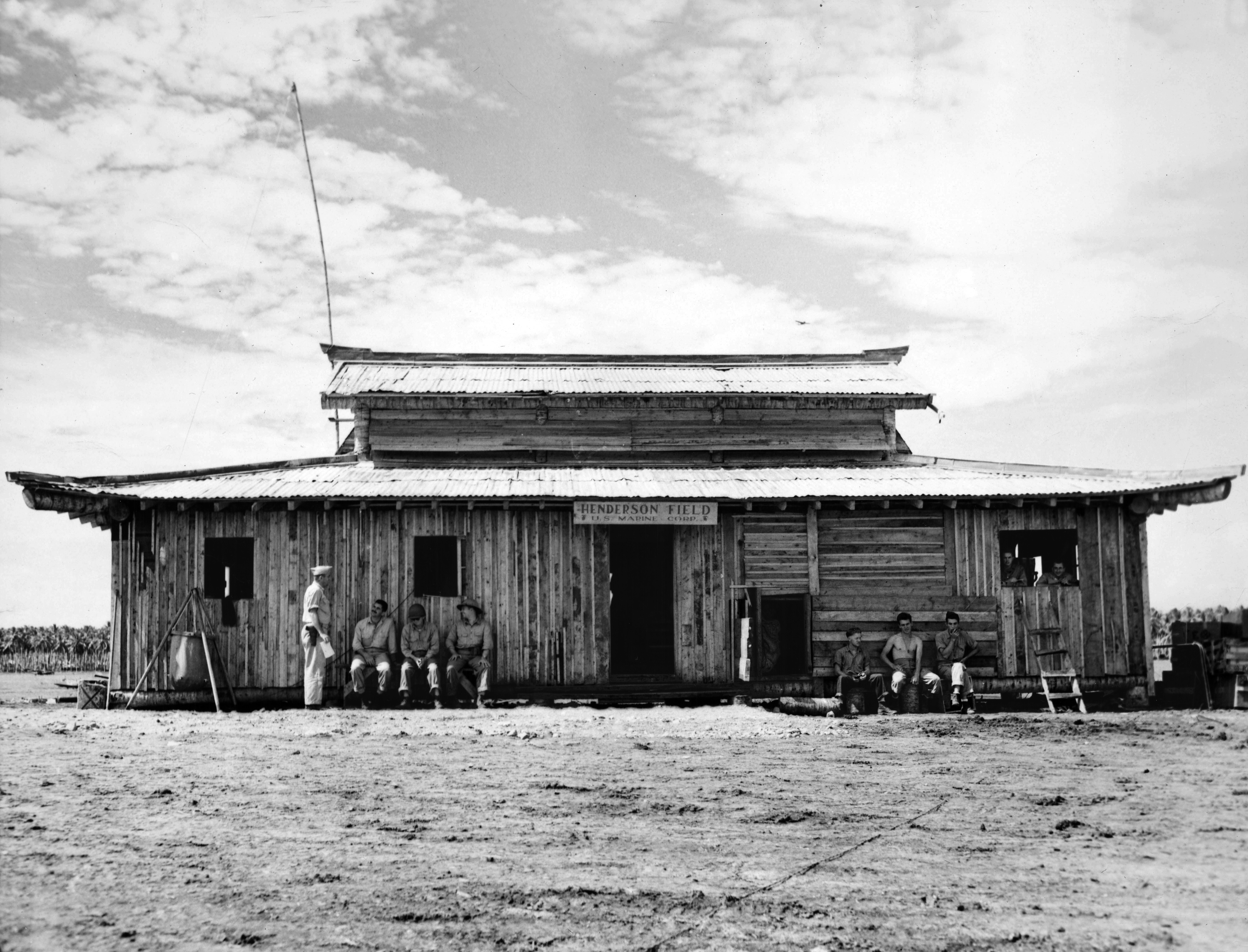
The Pagoda that served as the headquarters of the Cactus Air Force

The CAF reached its peak of combat power on 12 November with 47 fighters, 23 tactical bombers, and 12 medium bombers. On the morning of November 14, scout planes from the USS Enterprise spotted a large number of Japanese troop transports north of New Georgia headed for Guadalcanal. Every available Cactus aircraft supported by additional carrier aviation and B-17s flying from Espiritu Santo attacked the convoy. Four transports were sunk that afternoon and three more were set on fire and turned back north into New Georgia Sound. Two of these burning transports sank later that evening. After a month and a half of enduring continual shelling at night, the CAF got their first crack at a Japanese battleship on 15 November, after the first night of the Naval Battle of Guadalcanal, in which Hiei's steering was disabled. Unable to flee, Hiei was repeatedly attacked by aircraft from Henderson Field and from the USS Enterprise. After suffering numerous direct hits, and being set ablaze, the Hiei was scuttled by the Japanese.

The first aviation unit from another country arrived at Henderson Field on 26 November 1942: No. 3 Squadron RNZAF, with Lockheed Hudson light bombers for reconnaissance work.

=== December ===
On 26 December there were 161 aircraft of all types at Guadalcanal.

== Tactics employed ==
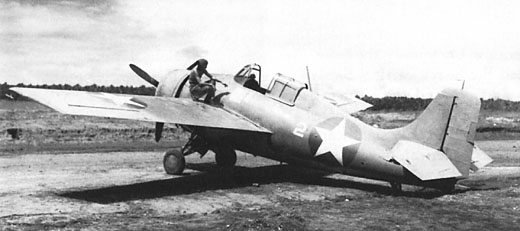
A Grumman F4F Wildcat parked on Henderson Field in August 1942

U.S. Navy and Marine fighter pilots, with little high-altitude experience, were at a disadvantage because their F4F Wildcat was slower, heavier, less maneuverable, and a slow climber compared to the agile Japanese A6M Zero. The American pilots learned quickly to not dogfight the Zero. Instead, if they became engaged with one, they would give it a quick diving firing-burst, then dive away to regroup, climb, and attack again. Cactus pilots constantly refined their tactics and techniques, relying on teamwork in dogfights, improving their gunnery to remain effective against the Zero pilots.

Because of the Zero's maneuverability, American pilots quickly adapted hit-and-run tactics similar to those used by the American Flying Tigers in China and Burma. They also used a two-plane flight section, a technique developed by the U.S. Navy fighter pilots John Thach and Edward O'Hare, and dubbed the "Thach Weave." The two aircraft remained in the same general area, and, if Zeroes showed up, they had a better chance of engaging the aircraft on the tails of their wingmen.

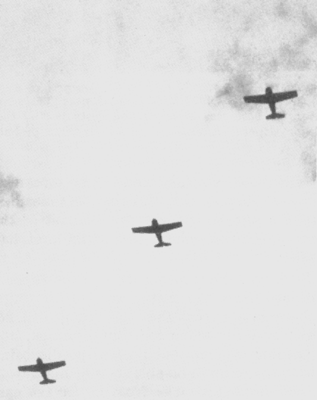
U.S. Marine F4F Wildcats head-out from Henderson Field, Guadalcanal, probably in August or September 1942, to intercept incoming Japanese aircraft.

According to one American pilot, "One Zero against one Grumman is not an even fight, but with mutual support, two Grummans are worth four or five Zeros."

The Wildcat had merits. It was well-protected compared to the lightly armored Zero, had a self-sealing fuel tank, and possessed adequate firepower with six .50-caliber M-2 Browning machine guns. U.S. Marine pilots, skeptical since the Battle of Midway, placed a great deal of confidence in their aircraft.

Because they could not effectively dogfight the Zeroes, Henderson Field's defenders could not gain air superiority to thwart Japanese attacks. They realized the best thing they could do was disrupt up each day's raid, whittle down the Japanese, then break-off to fight another day. With this in mind, their primary targets became the bombers rather than the fighters, and many of the tactics introduced were devised by Marine Major John L. Smith. The American pilots always sought to begin their attack at least 5,000 feet (1,500 m) above the Japanese formations, and they concentrated their attacks on trailing aircraft. This gave them good angles to shoot at the exposed fuel tanks of the Japanese bombers, and it presented a difficult gunnery problem for the bombers, since the high overhead passes of the American fighters put them into the blindspots of the Japanese gunners. This tactic also caused the escorting Japanese fighters to climb and burn more of their fuel, thus reducing their limited time over Guadalcanal.

From 3 September to 4 November 1942, the Cactus Air Force claimed 268 Japanese planes downed in aerial combat, and the damage inflicted on others is estimated to be as great.

== Coastwatchers ==
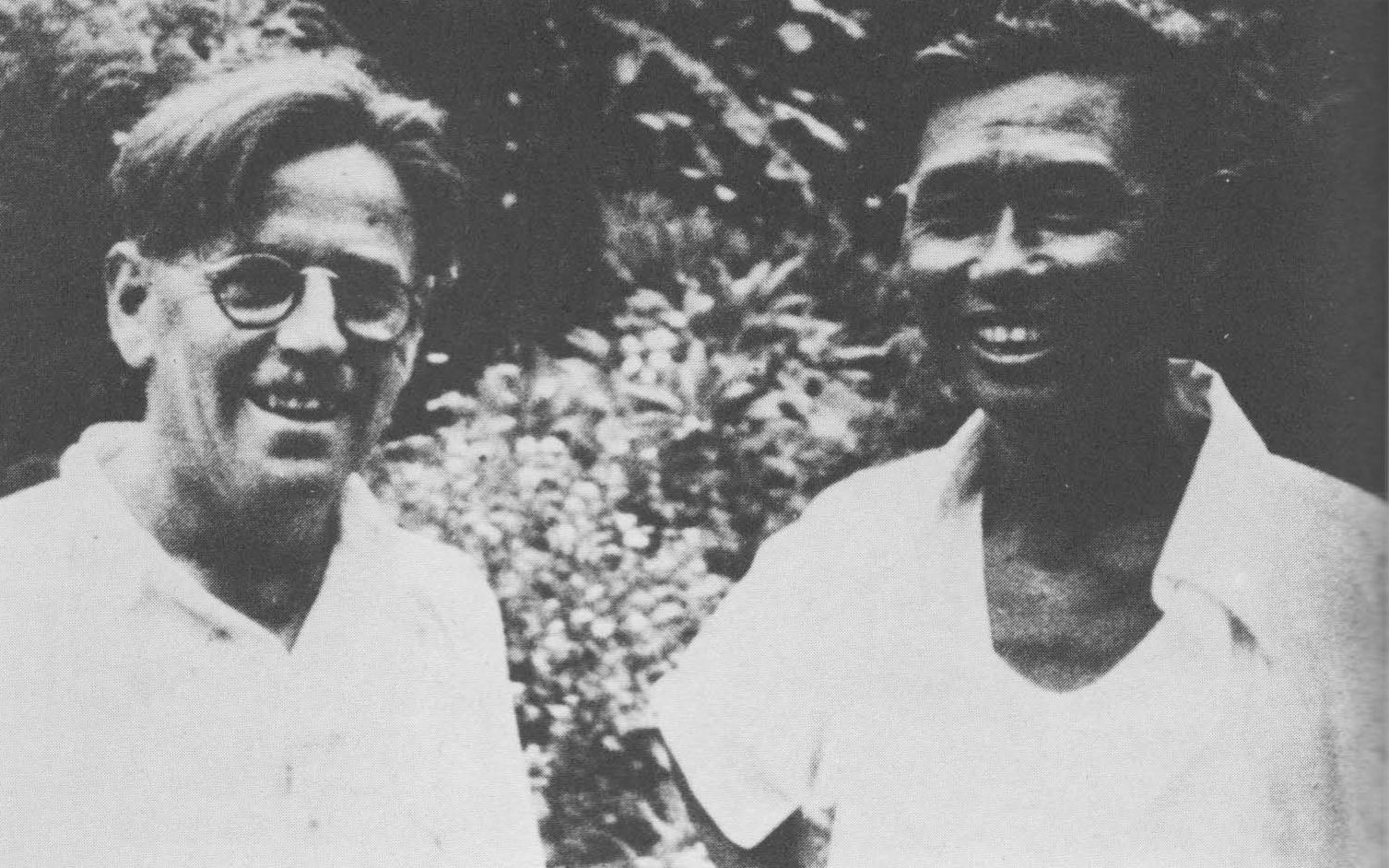
Paul Mason (left) was a coastwatcher in southern Bougainville during the Guadalcanal campaign providing warnings of inbound Japanese air strikes to Allied forces on Guadalcanal

Because of the limited number of aircraft and fuel available during the early stages of the campaign, the CAF was unable to maintain a standing combat air patrol over Henderson Field. Therefore, CAF needed early warnings of incoming Japanese aircraft so their aircraft were in the air during Japanese air attacks. Members of the Australian Coastwatchers, including W. J. Read in northern and Paul Mason in southern Bougainville, Donald Kennedy on New Georgia, and Geoffrey Kuper on Santa Isabel relayed as Japanese airplane formations were heading for the island, giving the defenders on Guadalcanal time to get airborne. On 16 August, Lieutenant Commander Hugh A. Mackenzie of the Royal Australian Navy, the Deputy Staff Intelligence Officer for the British Solomon Islands Protectorate, established a radio station at Henderson Field to monitor coastwatcher transmissions and relay their warnings to the CAF. Admiral Bull Halsey said the coast-watchers "saved Guadalcanal".

Several coastwatchers were stationed around Guadalcanal, including Martin Clemens (a local official for the British Solomon Islands Protectorate), Leif Schroeder, Donald Macfarlan, Ken Hay, and Ashton Rhoades. On August 14, Clemens entered the Marine lines at Lunga Point and met with General Vandegrift. The general placed him in charge of native administration and intelligence operations outside the Marine lines. These coastwatchers, with help from native Solomon Islanders, helped rescue and return several Allied pilots during the campaign.

== Aftermath ==
The Cactus Air Force's dive bombers and torpedo planes sank or destroyed 17 large enemy vessels, including one Japanese battleship, one heavy cruiser (the Kinugasa), one light cruiser (the Yura), three destroyers (the Asagiri, Murakumo, and Natsugumo), and twelve transports, possibly sank three destroyers and one heavy cruiser, and heavily damaged 18 other ships, including one heavy cruiser and five light cruisers. The largest vessel was the battleship Hiei, which was finished off by the CAF, along with aircraft from the Enterprise, and B-17s from Espiritu, after being crippled by American cruisers and destroyers during the Naval Battle of Guadalcanal.

The fifteen Marine combat squadrons on Guadalcanal during this time suffered 94 pilots killed or missing-in-action, with another 177 evacuated with wounds or with sickness (especially severe malaria). Losses for Japanese aircraft during the Guadalcanal campaign are unknown. Japanese records show that several Marine and Army pilots were captured on Guadalcanal after being shot down over enemy-occupied jungle areas, but none of the pilots survived their captivity.

== Medal of Honor recipients ==
Six aviators who served in the "Cactus Air Force" received the Medal of Honor for their actions during the Battle of Guadalcanal (August 1942 – February 1943):

- John L. Smith
- Robert E. Galer
- Joe Foss
- Harold W. Bauer
- Jefferson J. DeBlanc
- James E. Swett

== Order of battle ==
All aviation units on Guadalcanal were subordinate to Commander, Aircraft, Guadalcanal (ComAirGuadal).

USMC
- VMF-112
- VMF-121
- VMF-122
- VMF-123
- VMF-124
- VMF-212
- VMF-223
- VMF-224
- VMO-251
- VMSB-131
- VMSB-132
- VMSB-141

- VMSB-142
- VMSB-143
- VMSB-144
- VMSB-231
- VMSB-232
- VMSB-233
- VMSB-234
- VMJ-152
- VMJ-253
USAAF
- 67th Pursuit Squadron
- 11th Bomb Group
USN
- VS-3
- VF-5
- VS-5
- VF-71
- VT-8

Aboard the USS Enterprise

- VF-10
- VB-6
- VB-10
- VS-10
- VT-10
RNZAF

No. 3 Squadron

== Allied aircraft ==
- Grumman F4F Wildcat
- Douglas SBD Dauntless
- Grumman TBF Avenger
- Grumman J2F-5 Duck
- Bell P-39 Airacobra
- Consolidated PBY Catalina
- Lockheed Hudson (RNZAF)

== See also ==
- AirSols
- Admiral Aubrey Fitch
- Marine Corps Early Warning Detachment, Guadalcanal (1942-43)
- Military history of the United States during World War II
- List of active United States Marine Corps aircraft squadrons
- List of United States Navy aircraft squadrons
