= Louis Robertshaw =

American football player and United States Marine Corps general

Louis Bentham Robertshaw
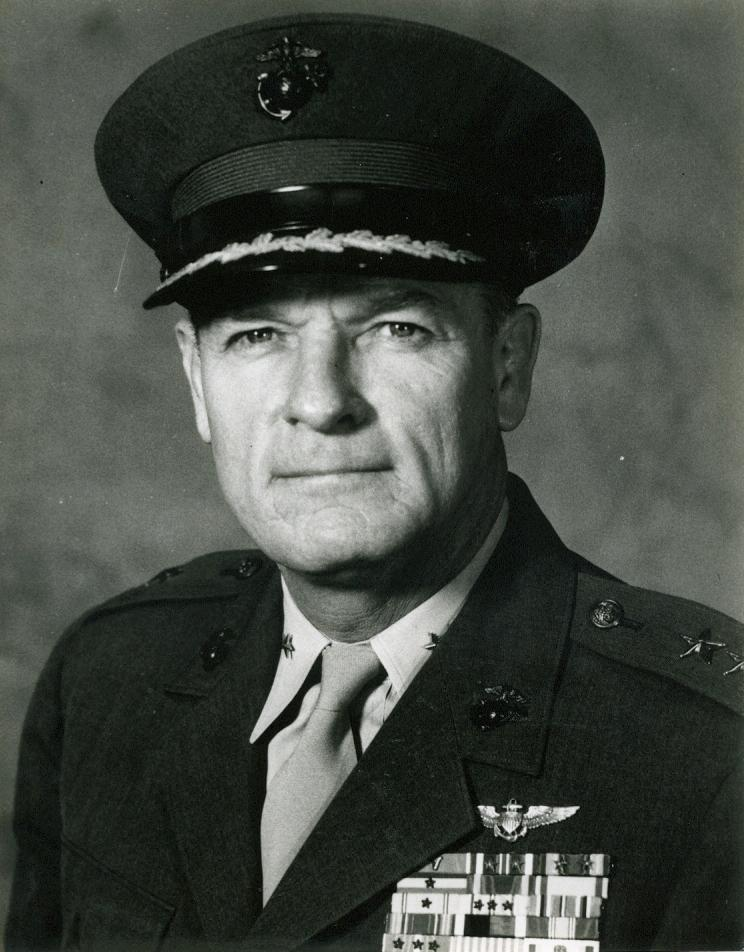
- Born: August 1, 1912; Philadelphia, Pennsylvania, U.S.
- Died: July 14, 2003 (aged 90); Chestertown, Maryland, U.S.
- Military career
- Allegiance: United States of America
- Branch: United States Marine Corps
- Service years: 1936–1971
- Rank: Lieutenant general
- Nickname: "Ben"
- Service number: 0-5294
- Commands: VMSB-132; 1st Marine Aircraft Wing
- Conflicts: World War II; Guadalcanal Campaign; Solomon Islands campaign; Korean War; Vietnam War
- Awards: Navy Distinguished Service Medal; Legion of Merit (3); Distinguished Flying Cross (3); Air Medal (12)

Louis Bentham Robertshaw (August 1, 1912 – July 14, 2003) was an American football player and lieutenant general in the United States Marine Corps. He flew combat missions in World War II and the Korean War and flew an F4B Phantom II fighter in the Vietnam War as commanding general of the 1st Marine Aircraft Wing. He received three Distinguished Flying Crosses, 12 Air Medals, the Navy Distinguished Service Medal, and three Legion of Merit with Combat "V."

== Biography ==
=== Early years and collegiate football ===
Robertshaw graduated from Haverford Township High School in Havertown, Pennsylvania, in 1930. He entered the United States Naval Academy at Annapolis, Maryland, in 1932, played center for Navy Midshipmen football team and was selected as a third-team All-American in 1935.

=== Early career ===
After graduating from the United States Naval Academy, Robertshaw was commissioned a second lieutenant in the United States Marine Corps in June 1936. He was assigned to the Philadelphia Navy Yard where he completed The Basic School for Marine Corps officers in June 1937. He served with the 6th Marine Regiment in Shanghai, China, and participated in the defense of the International Settlement in Shanghai from October 1937 to February 1938. In July 1939, he was promoted to the rank of first lieutenant while serving in China with the 2nd Battalion, 4th Marines.

In August 1940, Robertshaw was assigned to the Naval Academy in Annapolis, where he served as the executive officer of the Marine detachment and as a coach for the Navy Midshipmen in football and basketball.

In October 1941, while serving as an instructor at the Philadelphia Navy Yard, Robertshaw was promoted to the rank of captain.

=== World War II ===
In February 1942, two months after the attack on Pearl Harbor, Robertshaw entered flight school at the Pensacola Naval Air Station. He completed the course in August 1942 and became a Naval Aviator with the rank of major.

In October 1942, Robertshaw was assigned to serve at Noumea in New Caledonia. He assumed command of Marine Scout Bombing Squadron 132 (VMSB-132), an SBD Dauntless dive bomber squadron, in December 1942, after the prior commanding officer became a casualty. At the end of October 1942, VMSB-132 landed at Henderson Field, Guadalcanal. Upon arrival, they became part of the Cactus Air Force and fought during the Battle of Guadalcanal until December 1942 when they were relieved by VMSB-233. Robertshaw's unit moved to Espiritu Santo where they became part of the Strike Command of the 13th Air Force, responsible for attacking nearby enemy bases and shipping and giving what was then considered close support to front-line units. The squadron returned to Guadalcanal in June 1943. Robertshaw was awarded two Distinguished Flying Crosses and six Air Medals for his service in World War II, including an air attack on a group of Japanese transports in which Robertshaw scored a direct hit on one transport and severely damaged land installations in the area of the Solomon Islands in November and December 1942. Robertshaw was promoted to lieutenant colonel in December 1943.

In January 1944, Robertshaw returned to the United States, where he became the commanding officer of Marine Base Defense Group 41 at Marine Corps Air Station El Toro, California.

In June 1945, he was assigned to serve as Assistant G-3, Aircraft, Fleet Marine Force Pacific at Marine Corps Air Station Ewa, Hawaii. He was later assigned to serve as Marine Aviation Officer on the staff of the Commander of Naval Activities in Japan.

=== Post-war assignments ===
Robertshaw returned to the United States in July 1946 and served at the Marine Corps Air Stations in Miramar, California, El Toro, and Willow Grove, Pennsylvania. He later served in the Division of Aviation at Marine Corps Headquarters. He was promoted to the rank of colonel in February 1951.

=== Korean War through the early 1960s ===
In August 1952, Robertshaw was sent to Korea, where he became the commanding officer of Marine Aircraft Group 33 (MAG-33). He flew 77 missions in Korea from September 1952 to May 1953, flying an F9F Panther jet while stationed at Pusan Air Base. For his service in the Korean War, Robertshaw was awarded the Legion of Merit with Combat "V," a third Distinguished Flying Cross, and five Air Medals.

From July 1954 to August 1956, Robertshaw served on the staff of the Commander in Chief, Pacific (CINCPAC) at Pearl Harbor.

From 1956 to 1957, Robertshaw was a member of the Advanced Research Group, Marine Corps Educational Center, in Quantico. Beginning in 1957, he served as the assistant chief of staff, G-3, and later Chief of Staff of the 2nd Marine Aircraft Wing (2nd MAW), at the Marine Corps Air Station Cherry Point, North Carolina. During 1957, Robertshaw also served as the Marine Corps liaison officer during Operation Deep Water in Turkey.

In November 1959, Robertshaw became the assistant wing commander, 1st Marine Aircraft Wing at Marine Corps Air Station Iwakuni, Japan. Upon his return from Japan he became the Commander of Marine Air Reserve Training at Naval Air Station Glenview, Illinois.

=== Vietnam War ===
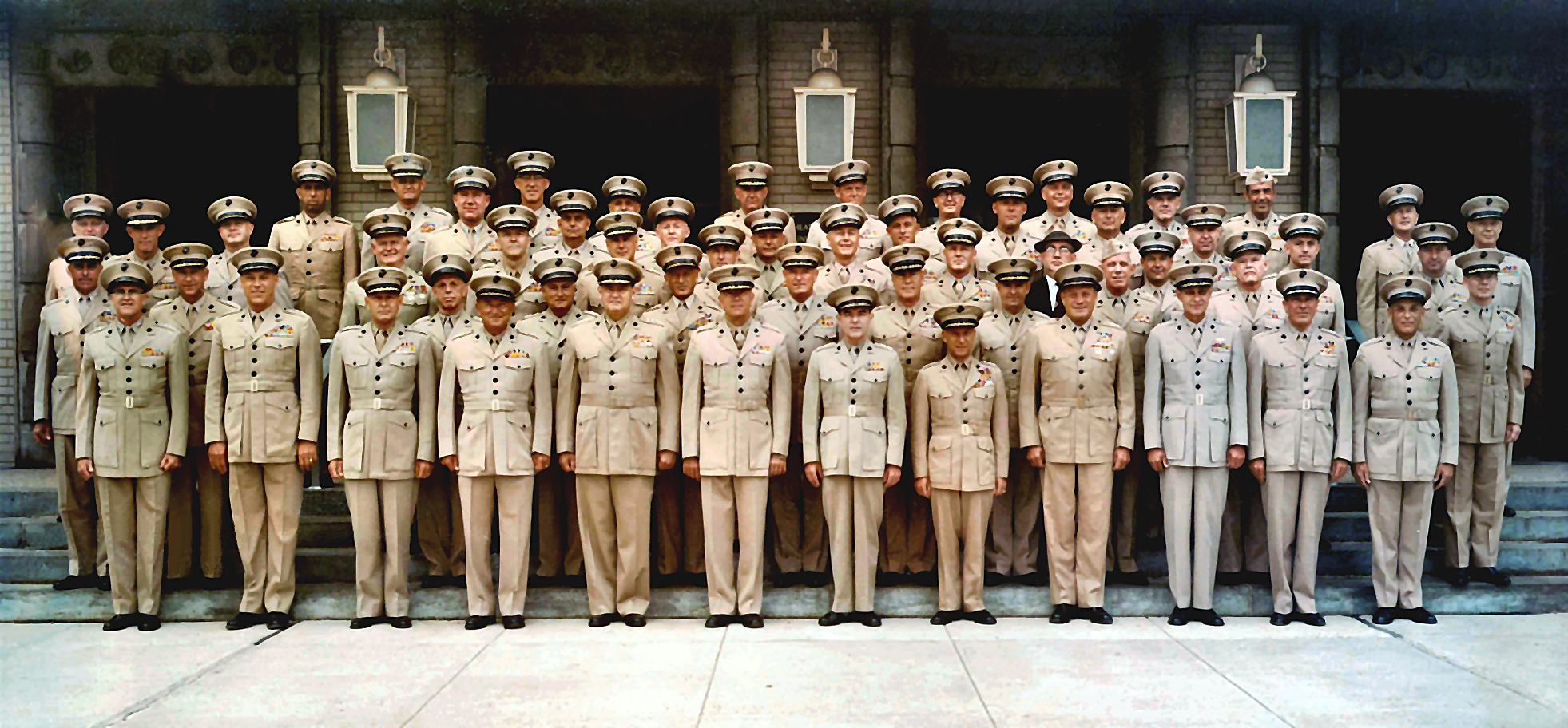
Robertshaw (6th from left, 2nd row from bottom) at the 1967 General Officers Symposium

During the Vietnam War, he flew an F-4B Phantom II fighter and served as commanding general of the 1st Marine Aircraft Wing in Da Nang, then as the Marine liaison for the Chief of Naval Operations. He rose to the rank of lieutenant general and was the Inspector General of the Marine Corps from July 1967 to March 1969. He was the deputy chief of staff for manpower at Headquarters Marine Corps when he retired in 1971.

=== Personal life ===
Robertshaw died of cancer in 2003 at age 90. He was survived by his wife, Marjo Robertshaw and four sons, Larry, Chad, David and Dan.

== Awards ==
Here is the ribbon bar of Lieutenant General Robertshaw:

Naval Aviator Badge
1st Row	Navy Distinguished Service Medal	Legion of Merit with two Gold Stars and Combat "V"	Distinguished Flying Cross with two Gold Stars	Air Medal with twelve Gold Stars
2nd Row	Navy Presidential Unit Citation with Star	Navy Unit Commendation	China Service Medal	American Defense Service Medal with Base Clasp
3rd Row	Asiatic-Pacific Campaign Medal with three service stars	American Campaign Medal	World War II Victory Medal	Navy Occupation Service Medal
4th Row	National Defense Service Medal with star	Korean Service Medal with three stars	Vietnam Service Medal with one star	Republic of Korea Presidential Unit Citation
5th Row	United Nations Korea Medal	National Order of Vietnam, 5th Class	Vietnam Gallantry Cross with Palm	Vietnam Campaign Medal

== See also ==
- 1935 College Football All-America Team
- List of 1st Marine Aircraft Wing Commanders
