= Robert E. Galer =

United States Marine Corps general

Robert Edward Galer
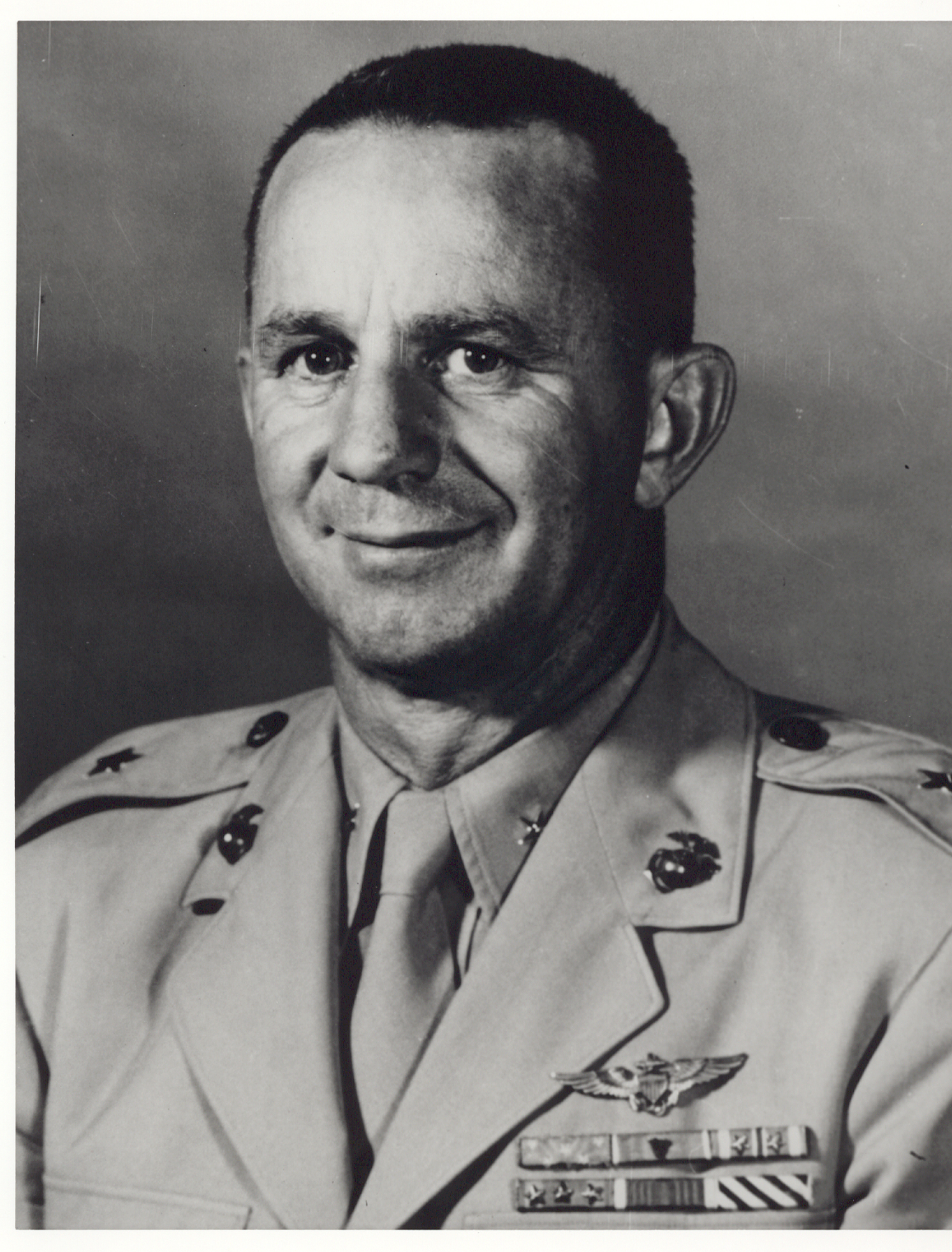
- Robert E. Galer, Medal of Honor recipient
- Born: 24 October 1913; Seattle, Washington
- Died: 27 June 2005 (aged 91); Dallas, Texas
- Burial place: Texas State Cemetery, Austin, Texas
- Military career
- Allegiance: United States of America
- Branch: United States Marine Corps
- Service years: 1935–1957
- Rank: Brigadier General
- Commands: VMF-224; Marine Aircraft Group 12
- Conflicts: World War II; Battle of Guadalcanal; Battle of Iwo Jima; Battle of Peleliu; Korean War
- Awards: Medal of Honor; Legion of Merit; Distinguished Flying Cross (2); Purple Heart; Air Medal (5)
- Other work: Vice President of Ling-Temco-Vought

Brigadier General Robert Edward Galer (24 October 1913 – 27 June 2005) was a naval aviator in the United States Marine Corps who received the Medal of Honor for heroism in aerial combat during the Battle of Guadalcanal in World War II. He went on to command Marine Aircraft Group 12 during the Korean War and retired a few years after in 1957.

== Early life ==
Robert Galer was born in Seattle, Washington, on 24 October 1913. He attended the University of Washington and was a brother of the Alpha Upsilon chapter of the Phi Kappa Sigma fraternity and an All-American in basketball. He graduated with a Bachelor of Science degree in commercial engineering in 1935, at which time he received an ROTC commission and began elimination flight training at the Naval Reserve Aviation Base, Seattle.

== Marine Corps career ==
In June 1936, he began his Aviation Cadet flight training at the Naval Air Station Pensacola, Florida, and was commissioned a second lieutenant in the United States Marine Corps on 1 July 1936. Following his designation as a Naval Aviator in April 1937, he was transferred to the 1st Marine Brigade in Quantico, Virginia, for duty with Aircraft One. In July of the same year, he was assigned to a course of instruction at the Basic School in Philadelphia, Pennsylvania. Following the completion of his studies in June 1938, he was ordered to the New York Navy Yard, but shortly thereafter was transferred to the Virgin Islands, where he served with Marine Scouting Squadron 3 (VMS-3) at Bourne Field, St. Thomas. He was promoted to first lieutenant in July 1939.

=== World War II and after ===
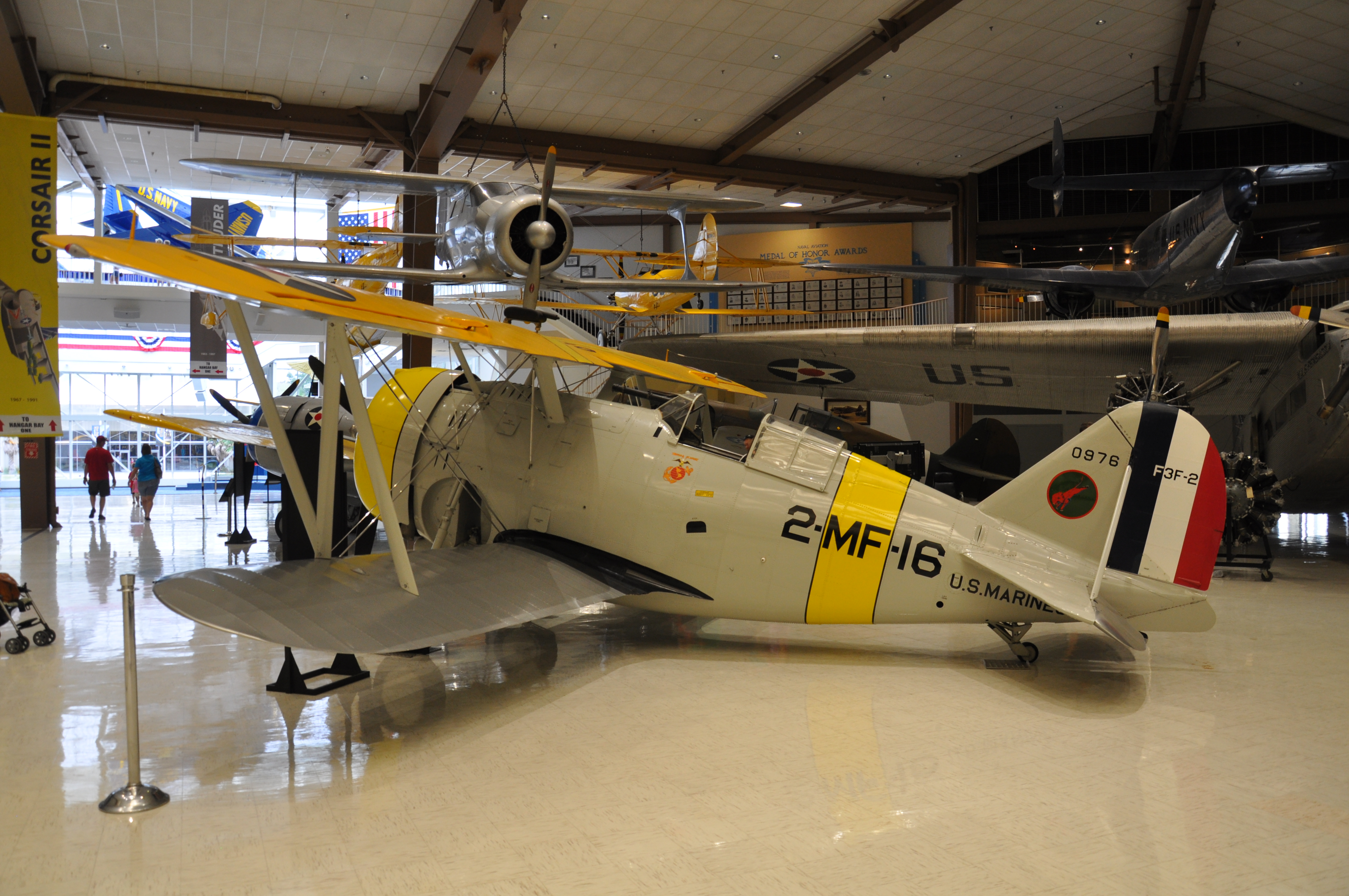
Grumman F3F-2, BuNo 0976, restored and displayed at the National Museum of Naval Aviation, NAS Pensacola, Florida, after 50 years in the Pacific Ocean off the California coast. It is marked as it was when ditched by 1st Lt. Galer.

First Lieutenant Galer returned to the continental United States in June 1940 and in July reported to the 2nd Marine Aircraft Wing in San Diego, California, and was assigned to Marine Fighting Squadron 2 (VMF-2). On 29 August 1940, Galer ditched a Grumman F3F-2, BuNo 0976, c/n 374, off the coast of San Diego while attempting a landing on the USS Saratoga (CV-3). The fighter was rediscovered by a navy submarine in June 1988 and recovered on 5 April 1991. It was restored at the San Diego Aerospace Museum. In January 1941, he was ordered to Hawaii and promoted to captain in March 1941. Galer was serving at the Marine Corps Air Station Ewa, Oahu, with Marine Fighting Squadron 211 (VMF-211) when the Japanese attacked Pearl Harbor on 7 December 1941.

In May 1942, Galer assumed command of Marine Fighting Squadron 224 (VMF-224) and on 30 August 1942 led the squadron to Guadalcanal, where they became part of the Cactus Air Force. It was while in command of VMF-224 that Galer would be credited with 11 confirmed victories and be awarded the Medal of Honor and a rare British Distinguished Flying Cross for the same acts of heroism.

Following the presentation of the Medal of Honor by President Franklin D. Roosevelt at the White House on 24 March 1943, Major Galer was ordered to Marine Corps Air Station Miramar, where he served as assistant operations officer. He was grounded because his superiors did not want to risk losing a Medal of Honor recipient; he had been shot down three times during the war. Shortly after being promoted to the rank of lieutenant colonel in November 1943, he was ordered to return to Hawaii, where he became chief of staff, Marine Air, Hawaiian Area.

In May 1944, Galer was named as operations officer, 3rd Marine Aircraft Wing. He served as an observer during the Palau Islands and Iwo Jima campaigns while on temporary duty from the 3rd Marine Aircraft Wing. His next assignment found him as training officer of Provisional Air Support Command, Fleet Marine Force, Pacific.

He again returned to the United States in June 1945 and reported to the Marine Barracks, Naval Air Training Base, Corpus Christi, Texas, in July as officer in charge of a cadet regiment. He remained in that capacity until August 1947, at which time he was assigned as a student at the Armed Forces Staff College in Norfolk, Virginia.

In June 1948, he reported to the 2nd Marine Aircraft Wing, at the Marine Corps Air Station Cherry Point, North Carolina, where he served as operations and training officer. He joined Headquarters Squadron-2 at that station in April 1949 and was transferred on 26 April 1950 to the Naval Air Station San Diego, California. He served there as Marine planning officer and, later, as assistant chief of staff for plans, on the staff of the commander, air force, U.S. Pacific Fleet. During his assignment, he was promoted to colonel in March 1951.

=== Korean War ===
Galer sailed in March 1952 for South Korea, where he saw duty as assistant chief of staff, G-4 (Supply), of the 1st Marine Aircraft Wing until the following May. He was then named commanding officer of Marine Aircraft Group 12 (MAG-12), and, for extraordinary achievement on 11 July 1952, was awarded a Gold Star in lieu of a second Distinguished Flying Cross. According to the citation accompanying this medal, he "led a maximum effort strike of Marine attack aircraft against a heavily defended industrial area in the North Korean capital city of Pyongyang."

Galer was also awarded the Legion of Merit with Combat "V" for his service in Korea. On 5 August 1952, he was shot down behind enemy lines by anti-aircraft fire while leading a flight of 31 warplanes against targets near the North Korean port city of Wonsan. He later admitted he "did a dumb thing": After completing the mission, "I went back to take a picture. And this anti-aircraft gun, he nailed me." He was later rescued by a HO3S-1 helicopter flown by 1st Lieutenant E. J. McCutcheon.

After a period of hospitalization, he returned to duty at Marine Corps Air Station El Toro, California, in October 1952, as assistant chief of staff, G-1 (Personnel), and later, G-3 (Operations), of Aircraft, Fleet Marine Force, Pacific. He was enrolled as a student in the Air War College, Maxwell Air Force Base, Montgomery, Alabama, in July 1953. Upon graduation from the college the following June, he was transferred to Headquarters Marine Corps, Washington, D.C., where he became assistant director, Guided Missiles Division, Bureau of Aeronautics, Department of the Navy. He served in that capacity until January 1956, when he became acting director. The following June he was awarded a master's degree in engineering administration from The George Washington University, Washington, D.C..

For exceptionally meritorious service in combat, he was advanced to brigadier general upon his retirement on 31 July 1957.

== Civilian life and death ==
He worked as vice president of the conglomerate Ling-Temco-Vought and later as an executive with Bright & Co.

Galer died of a stroke on 27 June 2005 in Dallas, Texas. He was survived by his second wife, Sharon Alexander Galer, four children and six grandchildren.

== Education ==
- University of Washington, B.S., Commercial Engineering, 1935
- Armed Forces Staff College, 1948
- Air War College, 1954
- George Washington University, M.S., Engineering Administration, 1956

== Medals and decorations ==
A complete list of Brig. Gen. Galer's medals and decorations include:

Naval Aviator Badge
Medal of Honor
Legion of Merit w/ Combat "V"	Distinguished Flying Cross w/ 5/16" Gold Star	Purple Heart
Air Medal w/ four 5/16" Gold Stars	Navy and Marine Corps Commendation Medal	Navy and Marine Corps Presidential Unit Citation w/ one 3/16" Bronze Star
Navy Unit Commendation	American Defense Service Medal w/ Fleet Clasp (3/16" Bronze Star)	American Campaign Medal
Asiatic-Pacific Campaign Medal w/ one 3/16" Silver Star	World War II Victory Medal	Navy Occupation Service Medal w/ 'Japan' clasp
National Defense Service Medal w/ one 3/16" Bronze Star	Korean Service Medal w/ four 3/16" Bronze Stars	Distinguished Flying Cross (United Kingdom)
Republic of Korea Presidential Unit Citation	United Nations Korea Medal	Republic of Korea War Service Medal

=== Medal of Honor citation ===
Citation

The President of the United States in the name of the Congress takes pleasure in presenting the MEDAL OF HONOR to
MAJOR ROBERT E. GALER
UNITED STATES MARINE CORPS
for service as set forth in the following CITATION:

Citation: For conspicuous heroism and courage above and beyond the call of duty as leader of a marine fighter squadron in aerial combat with enemy Japanese forces in the Solomon Islands area. Leading his squadron repeatedly in daring and aggressive raids against Japanese aerial forces, vastly superior in numbers, Maj. Galer availed himself of every favorable attack opportunity, individually shooting down 11 enemy bomber and fighter aircraft over a period of 29 days. Though suffering the extreme physical strain attendant upon protracted fighter operations at an altitude above 25,000 feet, the squadron under his zealous and inspiring leadership shot down a total of 27 Japanese planes. His superb airmanship, his outstanding skill and personal valor reflect great credit upon Maj. Galer's gallant fighting spirit and upon the U.S. Naval Service.

== University of Washington Medal of Honor Memorial ==
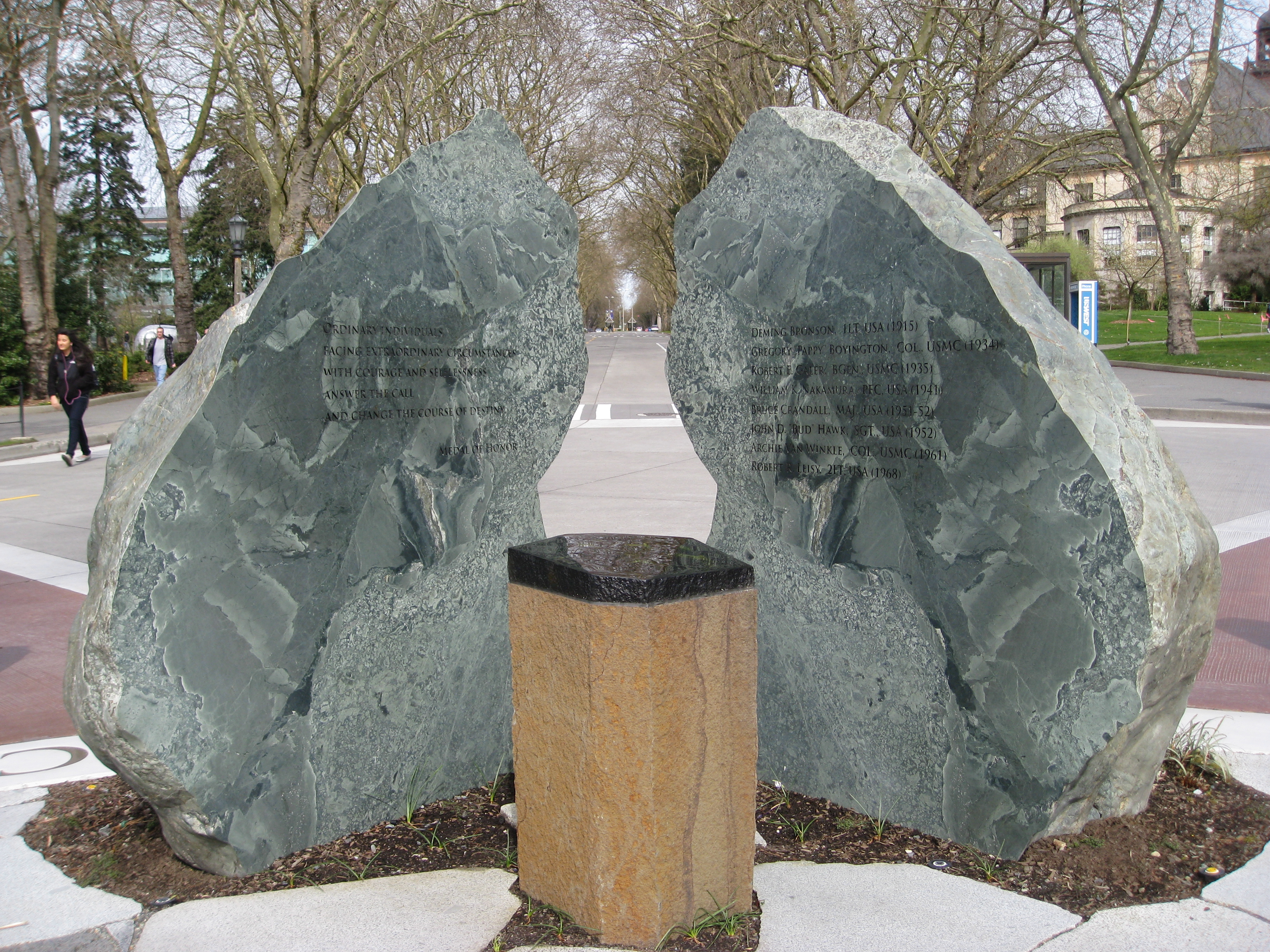
Medal of Honor memorial at the University of Washington

At the University of Washington in February 2006, a resolution recommending a memorial be erected to honor fighter ace and alumnus Pappy Boyington for his service during World War II was raised and defeated during a meeting of the student senate. Some people did not believe the resolution's sponsor had fully addressed the financial and logistical problems of installing a memorial, and some were questioning the widely held assumption that all warriors and acts of war are automatically worthy of memorialization. The story was picked up by some blogs and conservative news outlets, focusing on two statements made by student senators during the meeting. One student senator, Ashley Miller, said that the UW already had many monuments to "rich, white men" (Boyington claimed partial Sioux ancestry and was not rich); another, Jill Edwards, questioned whether the UW should memorialize a person who killed others, summarized in the minutes as saying "she didn't believe a member of the Marine Corps was an example of the sort of person UW wanted to produce." After its defeat, a new version of the original resolution was submitted that called for a memorial to all eight UW alumni who received the Medal of Honor after attending the UW. On April 4, 2006, the resolution passed by a vote of 64 to 14 with several abstentions, on a roll call vote. The University of Washington Medal of Honor memorial was constructed at the south end of Memorial Way (17th Ave NE), north of Red Square, in the interior of a traffic circle between Parrington and Kane Halls (47.6573°N 122.3097°W). Privately funded, it was completed in time for a Veterans Day dedication in November 2009. In addition to Greg Boyington, it honors Deming Bronson, Bruce Crandall, Robert Galer, John Hawk, Robert Leisy, William Nakamura, and Archie Van Winkle.

Ordinary individuals
facing extraordinary circumstances
with courage and selflessness
answer the call
and change the course of destiny.
Medal of Honor

== See also ==
- List of Medal of Honor recipients
- List of Medal of Honor recipients for World War II
