= R-Area Air Force =

Unit of the Imperial Japanese Navy Air Service (IJNAS) during the Pacific War

- Active: from 28 August 1942
- Country: Empire of Japan
- Branch: (Empire of Japan) Imperial Japanese Navy
- Type: Naval aviation unit
- Role: Seaplane
- Part of: 8th Fleet
- Garrison/HQ: Shortland Islands; Rekata Bay
- Aircraft flown: Mitsubishi F1M; Nakajima A6M2-N; Aichi E13A
- Engagements: World War II: Guadalcanal Campaign; Solomon Islands Campaign; Naval Battle of Guadalcanal; Operation KE

Commanders
- Notable commanders: Takatsugu Jōjima; Takeshi Horihashi; Kaneshige Watanabe

The R-Area Air Force (R方面航空部隊, R-Hōmen Kōkū Butai) was a unit of the Imperial Japanese Navy Air Service (IJNAS) during the Pacific War that was involved in the Guadalcanal Campaign and Solomon Islands Campaign. The unit operated seaplanes with a primary mission to protect resupply convoys headed for Guadalcanal and to conduct aerial reconnaissance.

== History ==
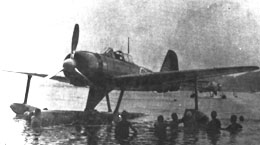
Nakajima A6M2-N (floatplane version of Mitsubishi A6M Zero) at Rekata Bay.

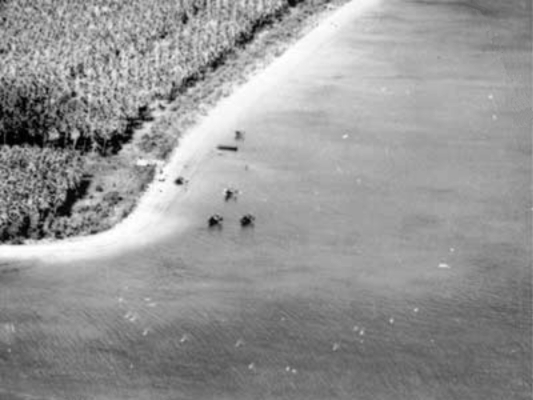
Mitsubishi F1M floatplanes at Rekata Bay.

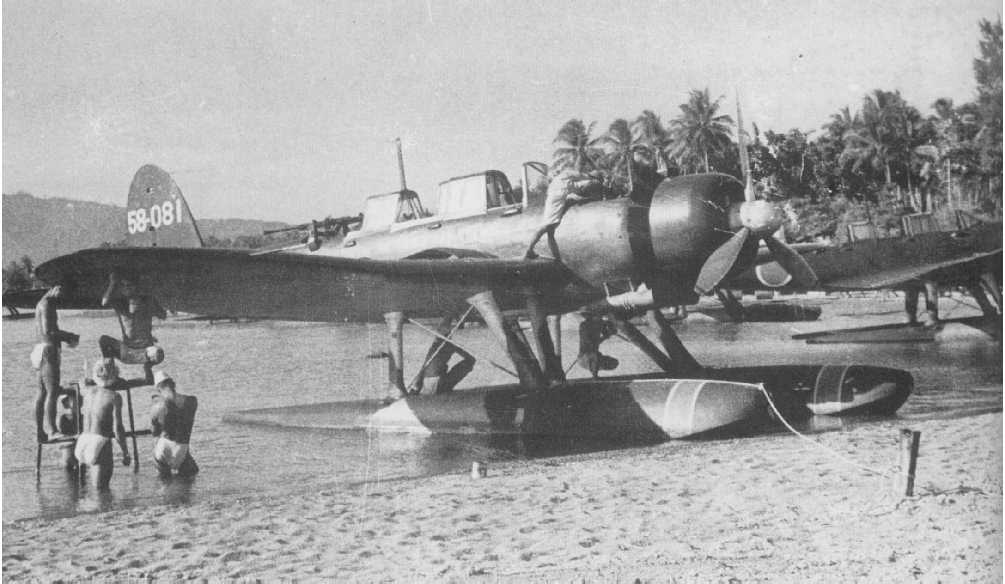
Aichi E13A was the main long-range reconnaissance aircraft of R-Area Air Force.

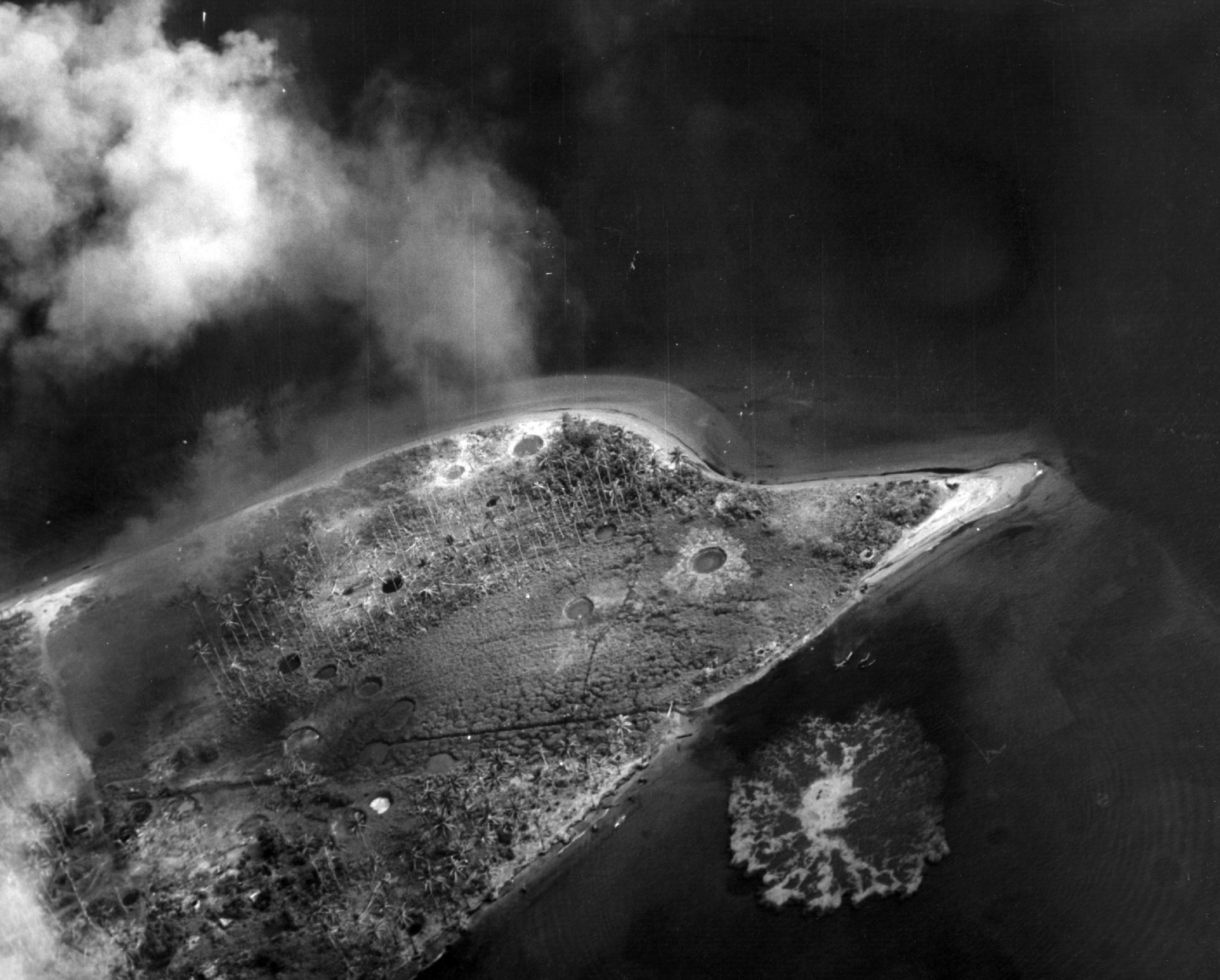
R-Area Air Force forward base at Rekata Bay under aerial attack.

The R-Area Air Force was created by the 8th Fleet on 28 August 1942 in response to the Allied landing at Guadalcanal a few weeks earlier. It exclusively operated seaplanes in order to compensate for the lack of land bases in the Solomon Islands area. The unit's primary strength was drawn from the 11th Seaplane Tender Division, whose commander Rear Admiral Takatsugu Jōjima also became the commander of the R-Area Air Force. The squadrons from the division's four seaplane tenders (Chitose, Kamikawa Maru, Sanyō Maru and Sanuki Maru) formed two air groups. Eventually, aircraft from other squadrons also joined the R-Area Air Force, such as from Kunikawa Maru. Their main base was at Shortland Islands, which was also the staging area for resupply convoys to Guadalcanal. The R-Area Air Force's primary mission was to provide air cover for the resupply ships during their runs heading for Guadalcanal through the New Georgia Sound. On 5 September, they built a forward base at Rekata Bay on Santa Isabel Island, which enabled the seaplanes to attack Lunga Point on Guadalcanal. Nevertheless, due to being in the range of Cactus Air Force, it was used only used as a staging point and the unit's seaplanes were not kept there for long at any given time.

On 12 September, Chitose squadron had 16 Mitsubishi F1M and seven Aichi E13A floatplanes under Lieutenant Takeshi Horihashi, while Kamikawa squadron had two F1M floatplanes and 11 Nakajima A6M2-N float Zeros under Lieutenant Jirō Ono, both forming No. 1 group. Sanyō squadron had six F1M and two E13A floatplanes under Lieutenant Tadashi Yoneda, while Sanuki had six F1M floatplanes under Lieutenant (jg) Kaneshige Watanabe, both forming No. 2 group. In the morning of 14 September, three float Zeros of Kamikawa under Lieutenant (jg) Masashi Kawashima flew from Rekata Bay to conduct a reconnaissance mission over Henderson Field and check whether the Imperial Japanese Army managed to capture the airfield in their assault. They were intercepted by seven US Navy Grumman F4F Wildcat fighters from Henderson Field and all of them were shot down for the loss of one Wildcat. That afternoon, Rear Admiral Jōjima committed most of the R-Area Air Force strength in a dusk attack on Henderson Field. Lieutenant Horihashi (Chitose Hikōtaichō) led 19 F1M floatplanes, each equipped with two 60-kg bombs, while two float Zeros provided the escort. They bombed the airfield after the sunset but were intercepted by a combination of eleven US Navy and Marine Wildcat fighters. The attack cost the R-Area Air Force two F1M floatplanes (including Sanyō Buntaichō Lieutenant Yoneda killed in action) and one float Zero.

The base at Rekata Bay was discovered by the Allies on 16 September and was subsequently targeted several times by Allied aircraft. In the morning of 5 October, aircraft from the aircraft carrier Hornet attacked Shortland Islands. No ships were hit but three Kawanishi H8K flying boats of Tōkō Air Group moored at Faisi were heavily damaged in strafing. Several F1M floatplanes under Lieutenant (jg) Watanabe (Sanuki Buntaichō) and two float Zeros of Kamikawa under Petty Officer Jirō Kawai intercepted the USN air strike and lost one F1M floatplane. Simultaneously, Cactus Air Force targeted Rekata Bay with several Douglas SBD Dauntless and Grumman TBF Avenger bombers, where they were intercepted by three float Zeros of Kunikawa under Warrant Officer Haruzō Ōta. In the engagement, Ōta managed to shoot down one SBD dive bomber.

Since regular resupply runs by destroyers only could not deliver heavy equipment on Guadalcanal, such as artillery, seaplane tenders Chitose and Nisshin were used as high-speed transports along the destroyers during October. Frequent missions to provide air cover over resupply convoys, combined with occasional base defences, took a heavy toll on the R-Area Air Force. By 8 October, the remaining strength was five A6M2-N float Zeros of Kamikawa, 12 F1M floatplanes of Chitose, Sanuki, Sanyō and Kunikawa, and nine E13A floatplanes of Chitose and Sanyō. On the evening of 8 October, Lieutenant (jg) Watanabe led eight F1M floatplanes to cover high-speed transport Nisshin and five destroyers headed for Guadalcanal. They intercepted a strike of SBD and TBF bombers escorted by 11 Wildcat fighters. While the ensuing air combat accounted for two F1M floatplanes and one Wildcat fighter shot down, the US bombers failed to score any hits on the ships.

On 12 October, the 14th Air Group with nine float Zeros joined the R-Area Air Force (delivered by Kiyokawa Maru) and the force continued to provide air cover for the regular resupply runs by destroyers. On 7 November, Lieutenant Hiderō Gotō led five float Zero of 802nd Air Group (redesignated 14th Air Group) to cover 11 destroyers on their resupply run to Guadalcanal, when they intercepted a large strike from Cactus Air Force. The resulting combat accounted for the loss of all floatplanes, however, in return, they shot down US Marine ace Joe Foss. Japanese made the final attempt to resupply Guadalcanal with 11 large transports and 11 destroyers under Rear Admiral Raizō Tanaka on 14 November. The R-Area Air Force provided eight F1M floatplanes under Lieutenant (jg) Shōichi Koyanagi of Kunikawa to cover the convoy. The air combat over the ships resulted in the loss of three F1M floatplanes. The next day they provided ten more F1M floatplanes under Lieutenant Horihashi and Lieutenant (jg) Watanabe and, lost two more, one of which carried Watanabe, who was killed in action. In addition, the resupply effort failed since only four transports eventually reached Guadalcanal but were all destroyed before they could unload their cargo.

The Imperial General Headquarters decided to abandon the effort to recapture Guadalcanal and they planned a withdrawal of land units for January and February 1943. The R-Area Air Force provided air cover for the evacuation during the Operation KE. They continued to operate throughout 1943, as the Allies moved up the Solomon Islands. Pending the loss of New Georgia, in late August the forward base at Rekata Bay was evacuated.

== See also ==
- Washing Machine Charlie
- Cactus Air Force
- Tokyo Express
