= Rekata Bay =

Coordinates: 7°34′S 158°43′E

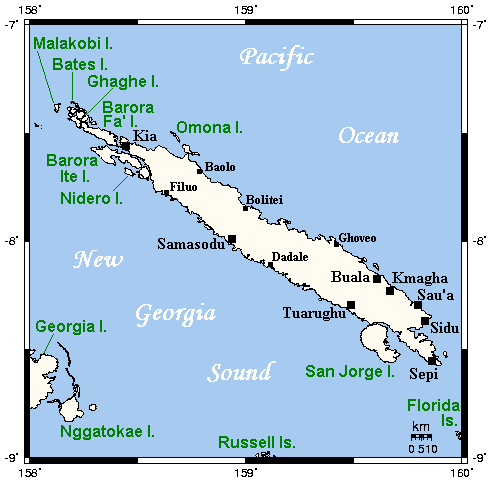
Map of Santa Isabel Island.

Rekata Bay, also known as Suavanau, is a bay located on the northeast coast of Santa Isabel Island in the Solomon Islands between Santa Isabel and Papatura Island.

== History ==
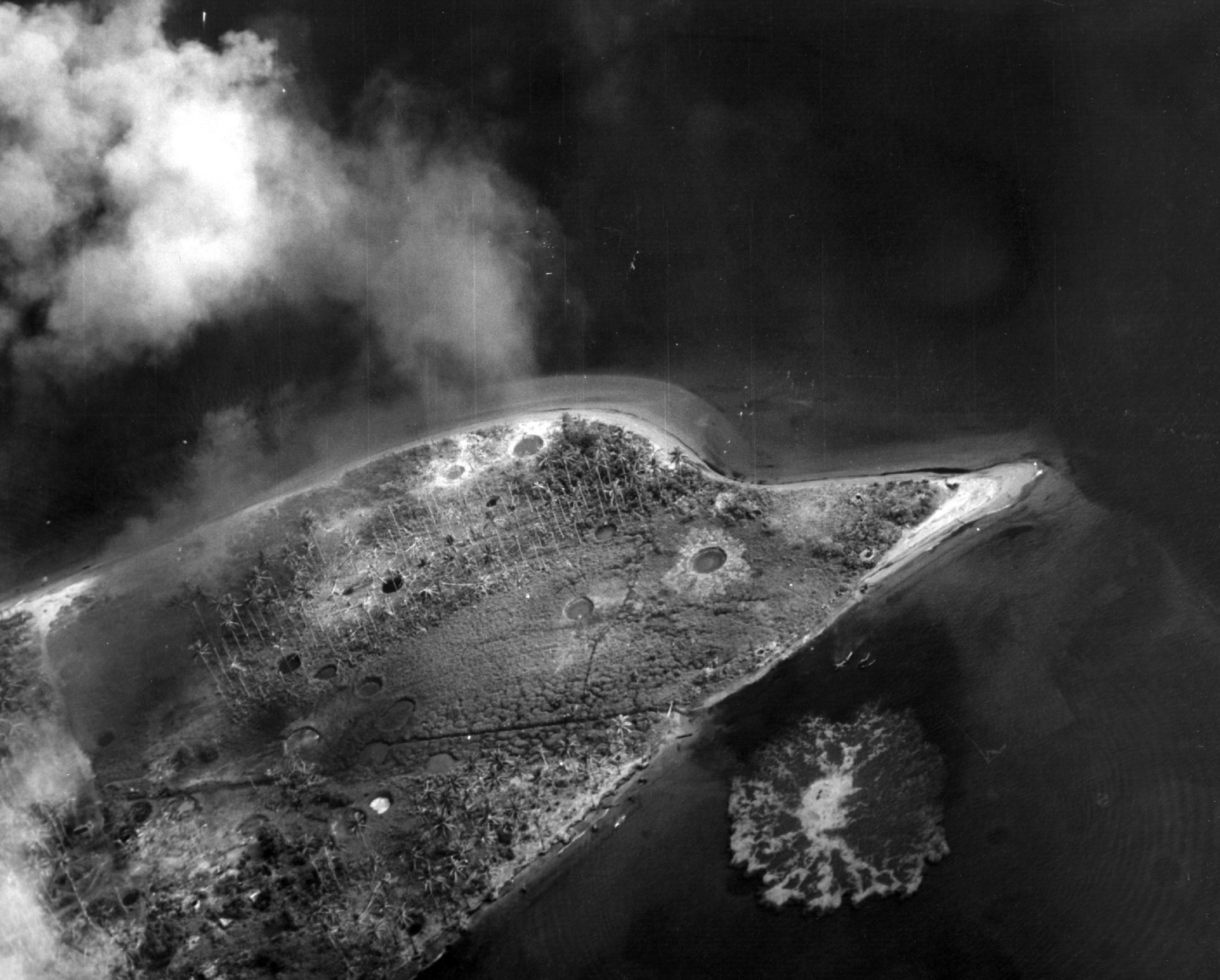
The Japanese seaplane base under attack, in August 1943.

Before the Second World War a copra plantation was built at Suavanau Point by Burns, Philp & Company Limited, known as the Suavanau Plantation.

During the war, the Japanese Imperial Navy constructed a seaplane base at Rekata Bay in the middle of 1942. It was used by R-Area Air Force as a forward base for offensive operations, mainly the nightly Washing Machine Charlie raids on Henderson Field, Guadalcanal. It was also used as an emergency landing and ditching area for aircraft damaged during the Battle of Guadalcanal. The base was defended by 3,100 troops of the 7th Combined Special Naval Landing Force and III Battalion, 23rd Infantry Regiment, 6th Division. The base was bombed by U.S. forces from August 1942 to August 1943. In the following month, the Japanese evacuated the base. Large bomb craters are still visible. A U.S. Navy team flew in during 1943 and examined 15 wrecked Japanese aircraft. A single PBY from No. 6 Squadron RNZAF finally visited the abandoned base on 28 August 1945, losing a man, who was possibly taken by a saltwater crocodile.

In the 1990s a small earth 2,900-foot airstrip was built at Suavanau Point.
