= VMF-132 =

U.S. Fighter Squadron prominent in WW2

Marine Fighting Squadron 132
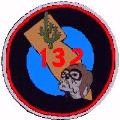
- VMTB-132 Insignia
- Active: 1932–1933; January 1935 - 9 November 1945; 1 July 1946 - Unknown
- Country: United States
- Branch: USMC
- Type: Dive Bomber squadron
- Role: Reconnaissance; Air Interdiction; Close air support
- Part of: inactive
- Nickname(s): Crying Red Asses
- Engagements: World War II * Battle of Guadalcanal

Commanders
- Notable commanders: Louis Robertshaw

Marine Fighting Squadron 132 (VMF-132) was a fighter squadron in the United States Marine Corps. The squadron, also known as "The Crying Red Asses", fought in World War II as a dive bomber unit during the Battle of Guadalcanal as part of the Cactus Air Force and later fought in the Central Solomon Islands. The squadron was decommissioned shortly after the end of the war but was reactivated in the Marine Air Reserve flying out of Floyd Bennett Field in Brooklyn, New York. They were again decommissioned sometime after 1958.

== History ==
Marine Bombing Squadron 6 (VB-6M) was formed in San Diego, California in 1932. They were deactivated shortly thereafter in 1933, only to reactivate again in January 1935. The squadron was redesignated as Marine Bombing Squadron 1 (VMB-1) on 1 July 1937. The squadron was again redesignated as Marine Scout Bombing Squadron 132 (VMSB-132) on 1 July 1941. At the outbreak of World War II, the squadron, under the command of Major A.D. Cooley, and its 19 Douglas SBD-1 Dauntless dive bombers were stationed at Marine Corps Air Station Quantico, Virginia as part of Marine Aircraft Group 11.

VMSB-132 left the United States on 13 October 1942 from San Diego aboard the Lurline. At the time of their departure the squadron consisted of 27 officers, 245 enlisted men and a few attached Navy personnel. They landed in Nouméa, New Caledonia on 28 October. On 30 October 1942, VMSB-132, under the command of Major Louis Robertshaw, landed at Henderson Field, Guadalcanal. Upon arrival, they became part of the Cactus Air Force and fought during the Battle of Guadalcanal until December 1942 when they were relieved by VMSB-233. The squadron’s pilots and gunners left the island on 24 December 1942 and arrived in Sydney, Australia for leave on New Year’s Eve. After resting, reorganizing, and retraining, they then moved to Espiritu Santo where they were met by their ground echelon in January 1943. During this time, they became part of the Strike Command of the 13th Air Force, responsible for attacking nearby enemy bases and shipping and giving what was then considered close support to front-line units. The squadron returned to Guadalcanal in June 1943 and flew missions from there until their return to the States on 26 October 1943.

Early in the summer of 1944, the squadron was reorganized and in training at Marine Corps Air Station El Toro as part of Marine Base Defense Air Group 41. On 14 October 1944, the squadron was once again redesignated, this time as Marine Torpedo Bombing Squadron 132 (VMTB-132). They received their first Grumman TBF Avengers in November of that year. The squadron training at Marine Corps Air Station Mojave, California from 15 December 1944 until 16 January 1945. They remained in training until they embarked on board the USS Cape Gloucester on 21 May 1945. They arrived in Leyte on 29 June 1945 and operated in the East China Sea during July and August 1945.

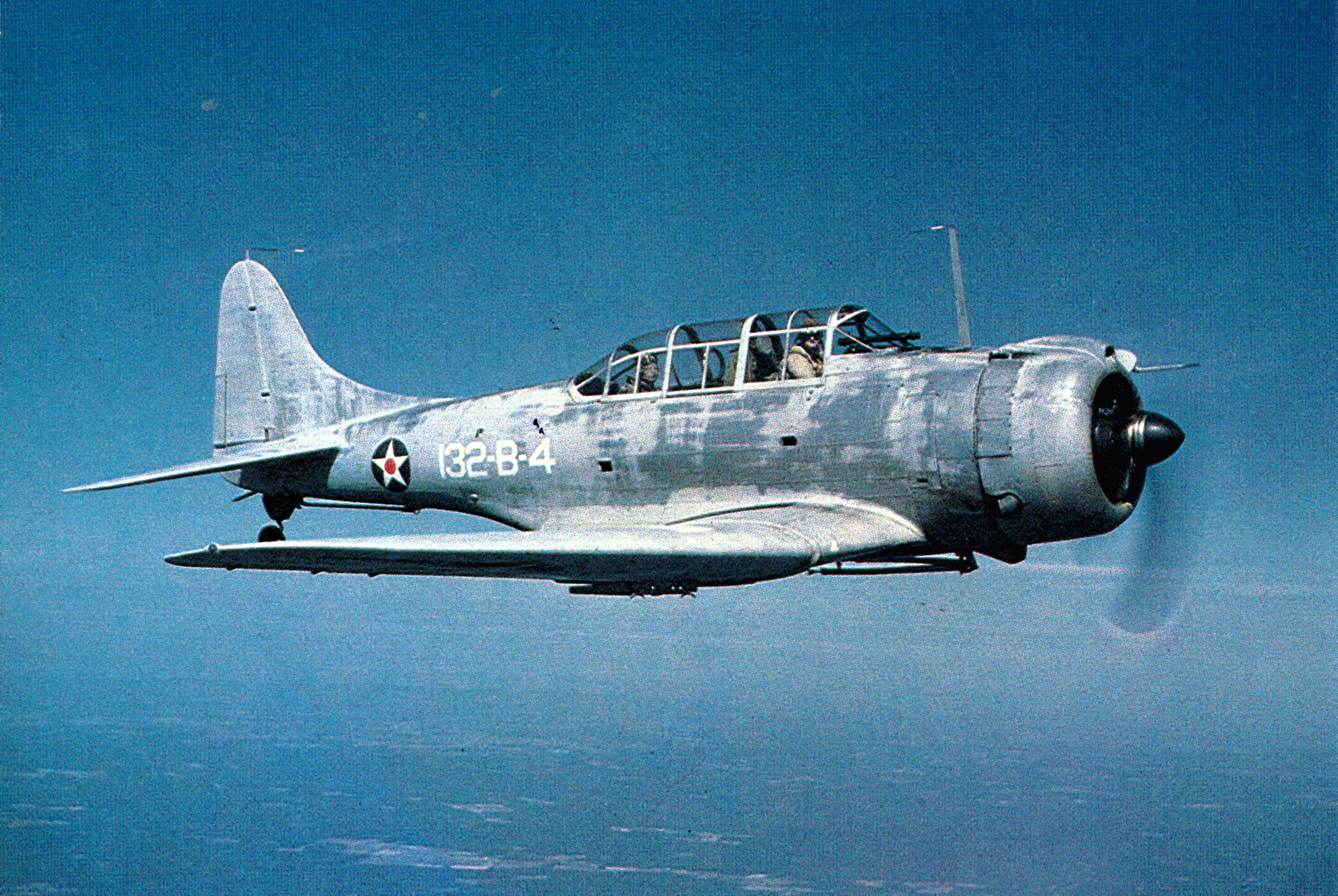
Douglas SBD-1 Dauntless of VMSB-132 in flight, in 1941.

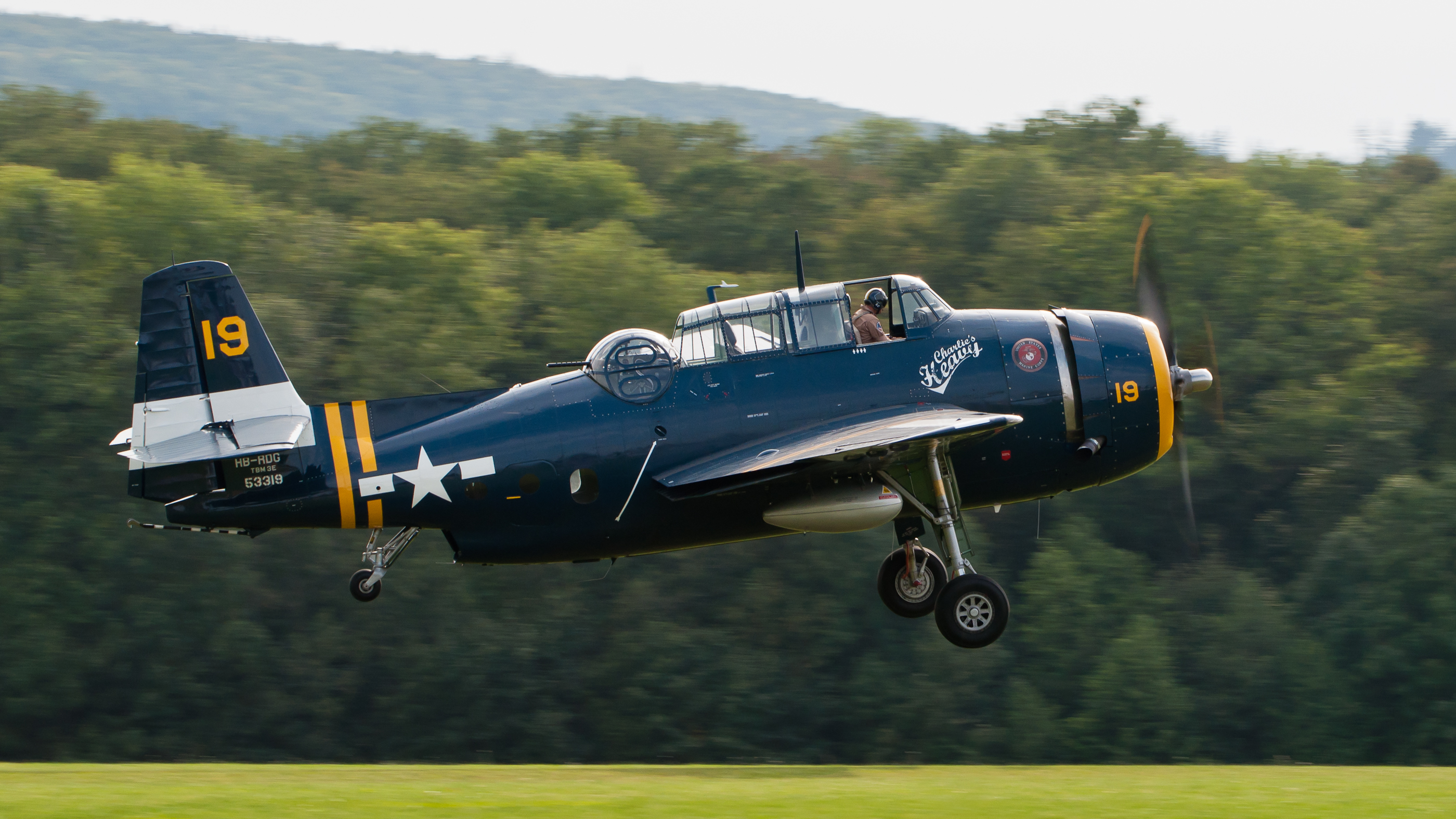
A preserved Avenger in 2013, painted as an VMTB-132 aircraft assigned to the USS Cape Gloucester.

Following the war, the squadron moved to Marine Corps Air Station Ewa, Hawaii where they were decommissioned on 9 November 1945.

== Awards ==
=== Unit ===
- Presidential Unit Citation — Guadalcanal/Tulagi (7 August – 9 December 1942)

== Notable Former Members ==
- Major Joseph Sailer Jr. - awarded the Navy Cross for his actions during the Battle of Guadalcanal from 10–15 November 1942
- Second Lieutenant Frank Christen - was a U.S. Marine dive bomber pilot who, on 16 December 1942, participated in a night strike against a Japanese destroyer off Munda, New Georgia in the Solomon Islands during the Battle of Guadalcanal. At approximately 2300 hours, Lt. Christen made the initial run on the destroyer and illuminated it with flares. Lt. Christen’s section leader, Lt. Jackson Simpson, then rolled in on the ship and scored a direct hit. A moment later, Lt. Christen made his own attack run and was last seen entering his dive. This was the last time Lt. Christen’s SBD was ever seen as it vanished into the night. Lt. Frank Christen and his tail gunner, PFC Glenn Shattuck, were reported missing in action (MIA) shortly thereafter. According to a translated Japanese report captured in Manchuria in May of 1943, Lt. Christen’s SBD had been shot down, and although his tail gunner had died upon impact, Christen had survived the crash and after almost 24 hours at sea, managed to navigate his life raft to a nearby island where he was captured by Japanese soldiers on 18 December 1942. Lt. Christen was then taken to Rabaul for interrogation and was reported to be a prisoner of war (POW). Frank died while in captivity and was declared dead by the War Department on 17 December 1943. Lt. Christen was posthumously awarded the Distinguished Flying Cross, the Purple Heart, and was promoted to Captain.

== See also ==
- United States Marine Corps Aviation
- List of decommissioned United States Marine Corps aircraft squadrons
- List of active United States Marine Corps aircraft squadrons
