= Takatsugu Jōjima =

Japanese admiral

- 城島 高次
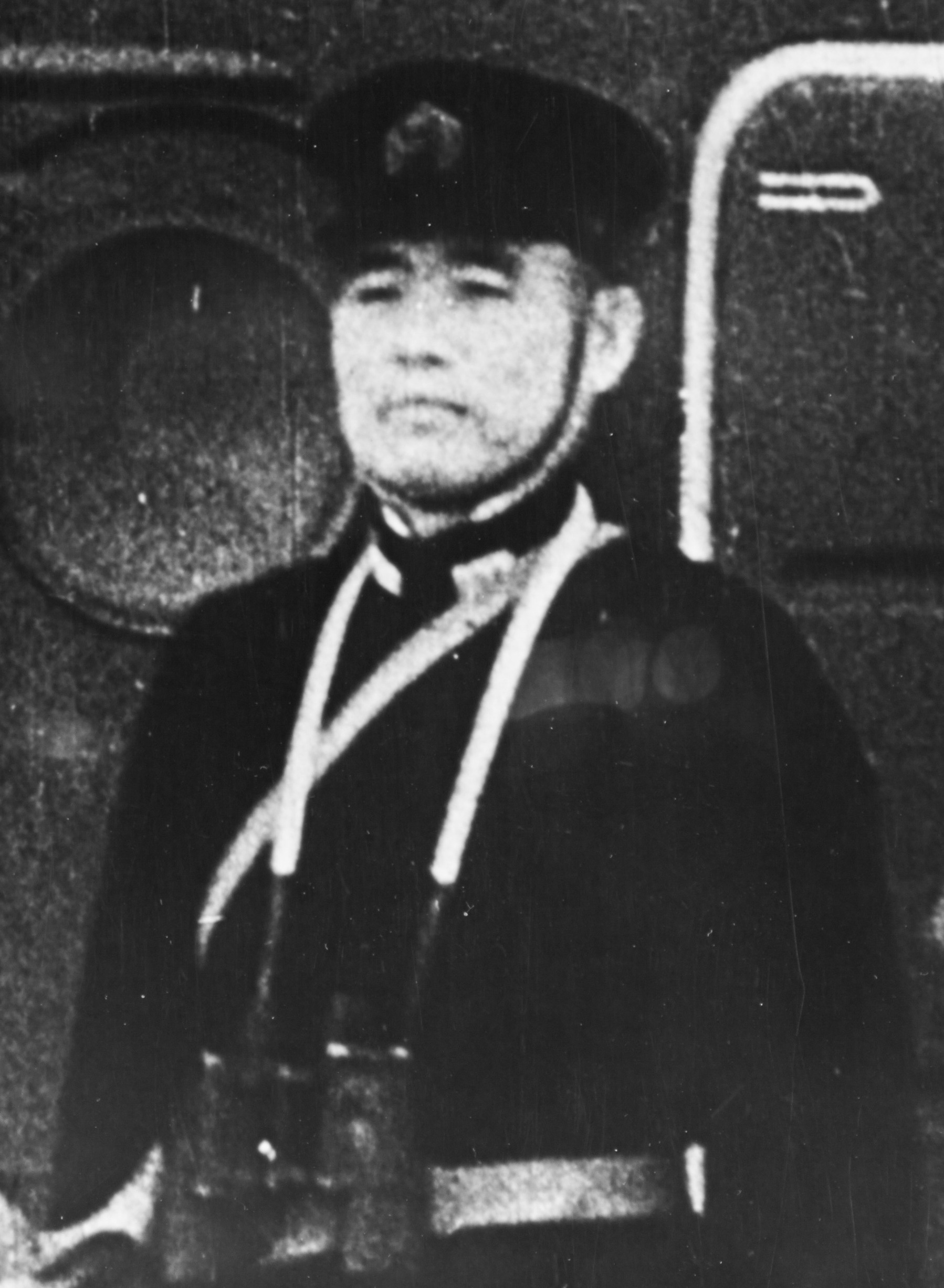
- Born: 20 June 1890; Saga, Japan
- Died: 25 September 1967 (aged 77)
- Education: Imperial Japanese Navy Academy
- Military career
- Allegiance: Empire of Japan
- Branch: Imperial Japanese Navy
- Service years: 1912–1945
- Rank: Rear Admiral
- Commands: Tsurumi, Hōshō, Hiryū, Shōkaku, 11th Carrier Division, 50th Carrier Division, 2nd Carrier Division, 652nd Naval Air Group, 21st Air Flotilla, 11th Combined Air Group, 12th Combined Air Group, Kasumigaura Naval Air Group, 12th Air Flotilla, R-Area Air Force
- Conflicts: World War II; Attack on Pearl Harbor; Battle of Rabaul; Indian Ocean Raid; Operation Mo; Battle of the Coral Sea; Guadalcanal campaign; Battle of Cape Esperance; Battle of the Philippine Sea; Battle of Okinawa

Takatsugu Jōjima (城島 高次, Jōjima Takatsugu; 20 June 1890 – 9 October 1967) was an admiral in the Imperial Japanese Navy during World War II.

== Biography ==
Jōjima was from Saga Prefecture. He was a graduate of the 40th class of the Imperial Japanese Naval Academy in 1912, where he placed 111th out of 144 cadets. He served as midshipman on the cruiser Azuma and battlecruiser Ikoma. After being commissioned as ensign, he was assigned to the battlecruiser Ibuki and then Akashi, and then back to Ikoma.

As a sub-lieutenant, he served on Nisshin, battleship Asahi, and the destroyer Hatsuharu. He was promoted to lieutenant in 1919 after attending advanced navigation courses, and became chief navigator on the patrol boat Manshu, transport Takasaki, minelayer Katsuriki, seaplane carrier Wakamiya, oiler Shiriya, cruisers Tatsuta, Natori, Abukuma, Haguro, and aircraft carrier Kaga.

Promoted to commander in 1931, Jōjima was assigned as executive officer on the aircraft carriers Hōshō and Hiryu. On 17 April 1941, he became captain of the aircraft carrier Shōkaku.

Jōjima was still captain of Shōkaku during the attack on Pearl Harbor, the Battle of Rabaul, the Indian Ocean Raid, Operation Mo, the Battle of the Coral Sea.

Jōjima was promoted to rear admiral on 1 May 1942. As commander of naval aviation units throughout the war, he also led the seaplane tenders of R-Area Air Force that participated in the defense of Guadalcanal during the Guadalcanal campaign including the Battle of Cape Esperance and Japanese efforts to recapture Henderson Field in 1942.

Surviving the war, Jōjima died in 1967.
