= Washing Machine Charlie =

Allied nickname for Japanese night-raider aircraft

Washing Machine Charlie was a name given by the Allies (primarily the United States) to Imperial Japanese aircraft that performed usually solitary, nocturnal operations over Henderson Field on Guadalcanal during the Guadalcanal campaign, as well as over other Allied bases during the Solomon Islands campaign, during the Pacific Theatre of World War II. The name came from the distinctive sound of the aircraft's engines.

The Japanese sent solitary aircraft on night-time missions over Guadalcanal and later other islands held by the Allies for various reasons, including scouting, dropping flares over Allied positions to assist Japanese naval or ground forces operating on or near the island, bombing airfields and installations, or simply harassing troops and disrupting their sleep.

Various aircraft were used, including ship- or shore-based single-engine seaplanes from the R-Area Air Force, and occasionally twin-engine Mitsubishi G4M bombers whose pilots made sure the engines were out of synchronization. The vibration created by the engines would wake most people; the readiness alert for potential bombs or combat would then keep the soldiers awake for the rest of the night. Later in the war, night fighters were used to stop these raiders.

Independent of Japanese operations, a similar term, Bedcheck Charlie, was used in the European theatre to describe lone Luftwaffe aircraft that would appear over Allied lines in the late afternoon and evenings.

== See also ==
- Night Witches, the dedicated all-female Soviet night harassment unit of the Eastern Front
- Naval Base Guadalcanal
