= Deaths in November 2007 =

The following is a list of notable deaths in November 2007.

Entries for each day are listed alphabetically by surname. A typical entry lists information in the following sequence:

- Name, age, country of citizenship at birth, subsequent country of citizenship (if applicable), reason for notability, cause of death (if known), and reference.

== November 2007 ==
=== 1 ===
- Irv Bemoras, 76, American basketball player (Illinois Fighting Illini, Milwaukee/St. Louis Hawks).
- Sonny Bupp, 79, American child actor (Our Gang, Citizen Kane), last surviving credited cast member of Citizen Kane.
- Troy Lee James, 83, American politician, member of the Ohio House of Representatives (1967–2000).
- Edith Motridge, 94, American Olympic backstroke swimmer.
- S. Ali Raza, 85, Indian Bollywood screenwriter, heart failure.
- Paul Tibbets, 92, American pilot of the Enola Gay which dropped the atomic bomb on Hiroshima, heart failure.
- Paul Woods, 57, British rugby union and rugby league player.

=== 2 ===
- Oreste Benzi, 82, Italian Roman Catholic priest.
- Henry Cele, 66, South African actor (Shaka Zulu) and soccer player.
- Charmaine Dragun, 29, Australian television news presenter, apparent suicide by jumping.
- The Fabulous Moolah, 84, American professional wrestler.
- Lord Michael Fitzalan-Howard, 91, British soldier and courtier, Marshal of the Diplomatic Corps (1972–1981).
- Don Freeland, 82, American racecar driver (Indianapolis 500).
- Witold "Vitek" Kiełtyka, 23, Polish drummer (Decapitated), injuries from bus crash.
- Igor Moiseyev, 101, Russian choreographer, heart failure.
- Jean Pierre Reguerraz, 68, Argentine actor.
- Reay Tannahill, 77, British food historian and novelist.
- S. P. Thamilselvan, 40, Sri Lankan leader of Tamil Tigers, air strike.

=== 3 ===
- Peter Andren, 61, Australian independent MP, pancreatic cancer.
- Maurice Couve de Murville, 78, French-born British Roman Catholic Archbishop of Birmingham (1982–1999).
- Aleksandr Dedyushko, 45, Russian actor, car crash.
- Malcolm Finlay, 88, British Olympic basketball player (1948).
- Marilyn Martinez, 52, American stand-up comedian, colon cancer.
- Donald Matthews, 82, American political scientist and author.
- Martin Meehan, 62, Northern Irish republican, later Sinn Féin activist, heart attack.
- Mary Walker Phillips, 83, American textile artist, Alzheimer's disease.
- George Ratterman, 80, American professional football player (Cleveland Browns), complications from Alzheimer's disease.
- Ryan Shay, 28, American long-distance runner, heart attack during Olympic marathon trials.

=== 4 ===
- Edward Bartels, 82, American basketball player (Denver Nuggets, New York Knicks, Washington Capitols).
- Emiliano Camargo, 90, Colombian Olympic fencer (1948, 1956).
- Cyprian Ekwensi, 86, Nigerian author.
- Gahanananda, 91, Bangladeshi religious leader, 14th President of the Ramakrishna Order.
- Hideo Hagiwara, 94, Japanese painter.
- Dorothy LaBostrie, 79, American songwriter ("Tutti Frutti").
- Karl Rebane, 81, Estonian scientist.
- Lennart Rönnback, 102, Finnish veteran of the Finnish Civil War, last of the White Guard.
- Peter Viertel, 86, German-born American author and screenwriter.

=== 5 ===
- Andrea Aureli, 84, Italian actor.
- Roberto Bortoluzzi, 86, Italian sports journalist and radio broadcaster.
- Christian Bove, 87, Argentine Olympic rower (1948).
- James Brabazon, 84, British author, lung cancer.
- Thelma Buchholdt, 73, Filipino-born American author and politician, pancreatic cancer.
- François van Kruisdijk, 55, Dutch Olympic swimmer (1972).
- Nils Liedholm, 85, Swedish football midfielder and coach.
- Paul Norris, 93, American comic book artist, co-creator of Aquaman.
- Paul Soloway, 66, American five-time world bridge champion, complications of infection.

=== 6 ===
- Enzo Biagi, 87, Italian journalist.
- Hilda Braid, 78, British actress (EastEnders, Citizen Smith).
- John Grenier, 77, American politician, former executive director of the Republican National Committee.
- George Grljusich, 68, Australian sports broadcaster, lung cancer.
- Sayed Mustafa Kazemi, 47–48, Afghan politician, former commerce minister, victim of Baghlan factory bombing.
- Fred W. McDarrah, 81, American photographer (Village Voice), documented the rise of the Beat Generation.
- George Osmond, 90, American patriarch of the Osmond singing family.
- Jimmy Staggs, 72, American radio disk jockey, esophageal cancer.
- Hank Thompson, 82, American country music singer, lung cancer.
- Hajji Muhammad Arif Zarif, 64–65, Afghan politician and businessman, victim of Baghlan factory bombing.

=== 7 ===
- Pekka-Eric Auvinen, 18, Finnish mass murderer, suicide by gunshot.
- Hobart Brown, 74, American sculptor, founder of the Kinetic Sculpture Race, pneumonia.
- Earl Dodge, 74, American presidential candidate (Prohibition Party), heart attack.
- Paul Dojack, 93, Canadian Football League referee.
- Rolf Vevle Eriksen, 84, Norwegian footballer.
- George W. George, 87, American Broadway and film producer (My Dinner With Andre), Parkinson's disease.
- Salome Gluecksohn-Waelsch, 100, German-American geneticist.
- Petr Haničinec, 77, Czech actor.
- Arthur Hezlet, 93, British Royal Navy Vice-Admiral, submariner and naval historian.
- Lidia Ivanova, 71, Russian TV journalist, announcer and writer, diabetes.
- Alejandra Meyer, 70, Mexican telenovela actress, heart failure.
- Kamineni Eswara Rao, 89, Indian weightlifter and Olympian (1952, 1956).

=== 8 ===
- John Arpin, 70, Canadian pianist and composer, cancer.
- Stephen Fumio Hamao, 77, Japanese Roman Catholic cardinal, former bishop of Yokohama, lung cancer.
- Bobby Harrop, 71, English footballer (Manchester United).
- Donald R. Herriott, 79, American physicist.
- Francine Parker, 81, American film director (FTA), heart failure.
- Dulce Saguisag, 64, Filipino politician, former Secretary of Department of Social Welfare and Development, car accident.
- Motosuke Takahashi, 66, Japanese film director and storyboard artist, lung cancer.
- David G. P. Taylor, 74, British businessman and public official, Governor of Montserrat (1990–1993).
- Bungo Tsuda, 89, Japanese politician, former governor of Kanagawa Prefecture, colorectal cancer.
- Chad Varah, 95, British Anglican priest, founder of the Samaritans.

=== 9 ===
- Helen H. Bacon, 88, American classical scholar.
- Florent Baloki, 36, Congolese footballer.
- Luis Herrera Campins, 82, Venezuelan President (1979–1984), after long illness.
- Lorraine Fisher, 79, American baseball player (AAGPBL).
- Bill Hosokawa, 92, Japanese American author and journalist.
- Ilya Zbarsky, 94, Russian head of Lenin's Mausoleum.

=== 10 ===
- Laraine Day, 87, American actress (Foreign Correspondent, The High and the Mighty).
- John Fee, 43, Northern Irish nationalist politician (SDLP), brain tumour.
- Augustus Hawkins, 100, American member of the U.S. House of Representatives from California (1963–1991).
- Norman Mailer, 84, American Pulitzer Prize–winning author (The Naked and the Dead, The Executioner's Song), renal failure.
- John H. Noble, 84, American prisoner in Russian gulag and author (I Was a Slave in Russia), heart attack.
- Sir John Stanier, 82, British Army field marshal, Chief of the General Staff (1982–1985).
- Donda West, 58, American Professor and Mother of Kanye West, coronary artery disease.

=== 11 ===
- Rob Frost, 57, English Christian Evangelist, skin cancer, liver failure.
- Anders Hald, 94, Danish statistician.
- Yukio Hayashida, 91, Japanese politician (House of Councillors), governor of Kyoto, Minister of Justice, heart failure.
- Kōjirō Kusanagi, 78, Japanese actor, interstitial lung disease.
- Berkeley Lent, 86, American judge on the Oregon Supreme Court, heart attack.
- Delbert Mann, 87, American film director (Marty, Separate Tables, The Bachelor Party), Oscar winner (1956), pneumonia.
- Dick Nolan, 75, American NFL player and coach (San Francisco 49ers, New Orleans Saints), father of 49ers coach Mike Nolan.
- Omwony Ojwok, 60, Ugandan politician, former minister, heart failure.
- Margarito Pomposo, 96–97, Mexican Olympic long-distance runner.
- Tadahiro Sekimoto, 80, Japanese electronics engineer and business executive, former president and chairman of NEC, stroke.
- Trish Williamson, 52, British TV-am weather presenter and producer, car crash.

=== 12 ===
- Ferdinando Baldi, 80, Italian screenwriter, film director and producer.
- Jack Bowman, 77, Australian rugby league footballer.
- Louis Galen, 82, American philanthropist and banker, heart failure.
- Ying Hope, 84, Chinese Canadian politician.
- K. C. Ibrahim, 88, Indian test cricketer.
- Vijay Kumar Khandelwal, 71, Indian parliamentarian.
- Piet Koornhof, 82, South African politician, former minister and ambassador.
- Ira Levin, 78, American author (Rosemary's Baby, The Stepford Wives) and playwright (Deathtrap), heart attack.
- Tinius Nagell-Erichsen, 73, Norwegian publisher (Aftenposten and Verdens Gang).
- Janlavyn Narantsatsralt, 50, Mongolian Prime Minister (1998–1999), car crash.
- A. Palanisamy, 74, Indian volleyball player.
- Peter Steiner, 90, Swiss musician and entertainer, fall.
- Lester Ziffren, 101, American reporter during Spanish Civil War, screenwriter and diplomat, heart failure.

=== 13 ===
- Wahab Akbar, 47, Filipino politician, representative for Basilan province, victim of 2007 Batasang Pambansa bombing.
- Harold J. Berman, 89, American Harvard Law School professor (1948–1985).
- Alec Cooke, Baron Cooke of Islandreagh, 87, British peer and former Northern Ireland Senator.
- John Doherty, 72, British football player for Manchester United (1952–1957) and Busby Babe.
- Hugh Gibbons, 91, Irish parliamentarian and Gaelic football player.
- Tony Harris, 36, American basketball player (Washington State Cougars), possible suicide by hanging.
- Kazuhisa Inao, 70, Japanese Hall of Fame baseball player for the Nishitetsu Lions (1956–1969), cancer.
- Erik Kurmangaliev, 48, Russian-Kazakh opera singer, liver disease.
- Sir John Loveridge, 82, British MP (1970–1983).
- Robert Taylor, 59, American 4 × 100 m relay gold medallist at the 1972 Summer Olympics, cardiac arrhythmia.
- Monty Westmore, 84, American makeup artist (Hook, Jurassic Park, Star Trek: First Contact).
- Peter Zinner, 88, American film editor (The Deer Hunter, The Godfather, An Officer and a Gentlemen), Oscar winner (1979).

=== 14 ===
- Emil Benko, 94, American basketball player.
- Michael Blodgett, 68, American actor and screenwriter (Beyond the Valley of the Dolls), heart attack.
- Ronnie Burns, 72, American actor, adopted son of George Burns and Gracie Allen, cancer.
- Hila Elmalich, 34, Israeli fashion model, anorexia nervosa.
- Hugh Gibbons, 91, Irish Gaelic footballer and politician.
- David Oppenheim, 85, American clarinetist, television producer and academic administrator (Tisch School of the Arts).
- Yadav Pant, 82, Nepalese economist and politician.
- Pablo Antonio Vega Mantilla, 88, Nicaraguan Roman Catholic Bishop of Juigalpa.

=== 15 ===
- John Cross Jr., 82, American pastor of the 16th Street Baptist Church, stroke.
- Sergio del Valle Jiménez, 80, Cuban general and politician, former Army Chief of Staff and minister.
- Domokos Kosáry, 94, Hungarian historian, president of the Hungarian Academy of Sciences (1990–1996).
- Audrey McCall, 92, American activist, First Lady of Oregon (1967–1975), widow of former Governor Tom McCall, complications from a fall.
- Lauren S. McCready, 92, American admiral, pioneer of the United States Merchant Marine Academy, heart failure.
- Joe Nuxhall, 79, American Major League Baseball pitcher and broadcaster for the Cincinnati Reds, cancer.
- George Van Meter, 75, American Olympic cyclist.

=== 16 ===
- Harold Alfond, 93, American businessman and philanthropist.
- Javier Escalza, 54, Spanish footballer.
- Gene H. Golub, 75, American mathematician and computer scientist, myeloid leukemia.
- Pierre Granier-Deferre, 80, French film director.
- Billy Hagan, 75, American racing driver.
- Grethe Kausland, 60, Norwegian actress and singer, lung cancer.
- Patrick F. Kelly, 78, American federal judge.
- Trond Kirkvaag, 61, Norwegian comedian, cancer.
- Don Metz, 91, Canadian ice hockey player (Toronto Maple Leafs).
- Jerry Meyers, 53, American professional football player (Chicago Bears, Kansas City Chiefs).
- James Daniel Niedergeses, 90, American Roman Catholic Bishop of Nashville (1975–1992), hemorrhage.
- Victor Rabinowitz, 96, American lawyer for left-wing clients and causes.
- Andrea Stretton, 55, Australian arts journalist and television presenter, lung cancer.
- Sir Arthur Watts, 76, British lawyer and diplomat.

=== 17 ===
- Irving Bluestone, 90, American negotiator for UAW, heart failure.
- Landis Everson, 81, American poet, apparent suicide by gunshot.
- Oleg Gazenko, 88, Russian space scientist.
- Hy Lit, 73, American radio disc jockey, Parkinson's disease.
- Robert Evander McNair, 83, American politician, Governor of South Carolina (1965–1971), brain cancer.
- Ambroise Noumazalaye, 74, Congolese politician, Prime Minister (1966–1968).
- Raghunandan Swarup Pathak, 82, Indian jurist, former Chief Justice of India, heart attack.
- Vernon Scannell, 85, British poet, long illness.
- Gail Sheridan, 92, American actress, stroke.

=== 18 ===
- Hollis Alpert, 91, American film critic, co-founded National Society of Film Critics, pneumonia.
- Peter Cadogan, 86, British writer and political activist (anti-nuclear campaigner).
- Antônio de Carvalho, 94, Brazilian Olympic sprinter (1936).
- Jim Ford, 66, American singer songwriter.
- John Hughey, 73, American steel guitar player for Vince Gill and Conway Twitty, heart failure.
- Ellen Preis, 95, Austrian fencer, gold medallist at the 1932 Summer Olympics, kidney failure.
- Joe Shaw, 79, British footballer, appearance record holder for Sheffield United.
- Chickie Williams, 88, American country music singer.
- Dick Wilson, 91, British-born American actor ("Mr. Whipple"), natural causes.

=== 19 ===
- André Bettencourt, 88, French Resistance fighter and politician.
- Paul Brodie, 73, Canadian saxophonist.
- Nyimpine Chissano, 37, Mozambican businessman, son of ex-president Joaquim Chissano, heart attack.
- Kevin DuBrow, 52, American rock singer (Quiet Riot), accidental cocaine overdose.
- Wiera Gran, 91, Polish singer and actress.
- Mike Gregory, 43, British Lions rugby league captain, motor neurone disease.
- Peter Haining, 67, British author, heart attack.
- Ken Leek, 72, British international footballer (Wales, Birmingham City).
- Laʻulu Fetauimalemau Mataʻafa, 79, Samoan educator, community worker, diplomat and former Member of Parliament.
- Channaiah Odeyar, 91, Indian Lok Sabha MP.
- Graham Paddon, 57, British footballer (Norwich City, West Ham United).
- Milo Radulovich, 81, American airman threatened by McCarthyism and championed by Edward R. Murrow, stroke.
- Jim Ringo, 75, American professional football player (Green Bay Packers) and member of the Pro Football Hall of Fame.
- John Straffen, 77, British murderer, Britain's longest serving prisoner (56 years), natural causes.
- Magda Szabó, 90, Hungarian writer.

=== 20 ===
- Nigel Bridge, Baron Bridge of Harwich, 90, British judge.
- James Lamond, 78, British Lord Provost of Aberdeen, MP (Oldham East, Oldham Central and Royton) (1970–1992), pneumonia.
- Ernest "Doc" Paulin, 100, American jazz musician.
- Ian Smith, 88, Rhodesian politician, Prime Minister (1964–1979).

=== 21 ===
- Valda Aveling, 87, Australian pianist, harpsichordist and clavichordist.
- Fernando Fernán Gómez, 86, Spanish actor.
- Andrew Földi, 81, Hungarian opera singer.
- Tom Johnson, 79, Canadian Hall of Fame hockey player (Montreal Canadiens, Boston Bruins), heart failure.
- Richard Leigh, 64, American author (The Holy Blood and the Holy Grail).
- Noel McGregor, 75, New Zealand Test cricketer.
- Herbert Saffir, 90, American engineer, co-creator of the Saffir-Simpson Hurricane Scale; complications from surgery.

=== 22 ===
- Maurice Béjart, 80, French choreographer.
- Jefferson J. DeBlanc, 86, American fighter pilot, Medal of Honor recipient, pneumonia.
- Esteve Dolsa, 71, Andorran Olympic sports shooter (1976).
- Takami Eto, 82, Japanese politician, former member of the House of Representatives, heart failure.
- Vladimir Kazantsev, 84, Russian Olympic athlete, silver medalist in 3000m steeplechase (1952).
- Verity Lambert, 71, British TV producer, BBC's first female producer (Doctor Who).
- Richard Nolte, 86, American expert on the Middle East, complications from a stroke.
- Reg Park, 79, British bodybuilder, Mr. Universe (1951), skin cancer.
- Dallas Schmidt, 85, Canadian fighter pilot and politician.

=== 23 ===
- Peter Burgstaller, 43, Austrian football goalkeeper (Austria Salzburg), shot.
- Patricia M. Byrne, 82, American diplomat, United States Ambassador to Burma (1979–1983), cerebral hemorrhage.
- Vladas Douksas, 74, Uruguayan footballer.
- Aloysius C. Galvin, 82, American Jesuit priest, President of the University of Scranton (1965–1970), cancer.
- Maximiliano Garafulic, 69, Chilean Olympic basketball player (1956).
- Frank Guarrera, 83, American baritone with the Metropolitan Opera.
- Chico Heron, 71, Panamanian baseball player, manager, and scout.
- Viktor Ivanov, 51, Soviet Ukrainian boxer (1976).
- Joe Kennedy, 28, American baseball player, hypertensive and valvular heart disease.
- Vladimir Kryuchkov, 83, Russian former KGB chief, led coup against Mikhail Gorbachev.
- Colin Park, 63, Canadian Olympic sailor
- Óscar Sánchez, 36, Bolivian footballer, cancer.
- William Tallon, 72, British servant to HM Queen Elizabeth, the Queen Mother.
- Francisco Candel Tortajada, 82, Spanish Catalan writer, cancer.
- Henrietta Valor, 72, American Broadway singer and actress, Alzheimer's disease.
- Robert Vesco, 73, American fugitive financier, lung cancer.
- Edmund Hoyle Vestey, 75, British businessman.
- Pat Walsh, 71, New Zealand rugby union player and selector, All Black (1955–1964).

=== 24 ===
- Angel of Death, 54, American professional wrestler.
- Farid Babayev, 48, Russian politician with the Yabloko party, homicide by gunshot.
- Imil Jarjoui, 72, Palestinian member of the Palestinian Legislative Council and the PLO executive committee, heart attack.
- Antonio Lamer, 74, Canadian lawyer and Chief Justice of Canada (1990–2000), heart disease.
- Joseph Minish, 91, American member of the US House of Representatives from New Jersey (1963–1985).
- William A. O'Neill, 77, American politician, Governor of Connecticut (1980–1991), complications of emphysema.
- Emily Sander, 18, American murder victim.
- David H. Shepard, 84, American inventor, bronchiectasis.

=== 25 ===
- Lola Almudevar, 29, British news reporter, car accident.
- Agnethe Davidsen, 60, Greenlandic politician, Mayor of Nuuk (1993–2007).
- Roberto Del Giudice, 67, Italian voice actor.
- Arthur Dimmock, 89, British campaigner for the deaf.
- John Drury, 80, American television journalist, amyotrophic lateral sclerosis.
- Norm Hacking, 57, Canadian musician and author, suspected heart attack.
- Buster Harvey, 57, Canadian ice hockey player.
- Neil Hope, 35, Canadian actor (Degrassi Junior High, Degrassi High), natural causes.
- Peter Houghton, 68, British recipient of the first artificial heart transplant, multiple organ failure.
- Peter Lipton, 53, American philosopher, heart attack.
- Karl Ohs, 61, American politician, Lieutenant Governor of Montana (2001–2005), brain cancer.
- David Francis Pocock, 79, British anthropologist.
- Matt Price, 46, Australian journalist (Nine Network, The Australian), brain tumour.

=== 26 ===
- Marit Allen, 66, British film costume designer (Mrs. Doubtfire, Eyes Wide Shut, Dirty Rotten Scoundrels), brain aneurysm.
- Buddy Burris, 84, American football player (Green Bay Packers).
- Birgir Guðlaugsson, 66, Icelandic Olympic cross-country skier (1964).
- George Harris, 84, Australian football administrator, former Carlton president.
- Bill Hartack, 74, American Hall of Fame jockey, five-time winner of the Kentucky Derby, heart attack.
- Silvestre S. Herrera, 90, Mexican-born American soldier, Medal of Honor recipient.
- Takafumi Isomura, 76, Japanese politician, mayor of Osaka (1995–2003), hepatocellular carcinoma.
- Elaine Lorillard, 93, American socialite, helped start Newport Jazz Festival, infection.
- Herb McKenley, 85, Jamaican 400 m relay gold medalist at 1952 Summer Olympics.
- Noel Miller, 94, Australian cricketer.
- Raleigh Rhodes, 89, American World War II pilot, early leader of the Blue Angels, lung cancer.
- Jaroslav Skála, 91, Czech psychiatrist, campaigner against alcoholism.
- Stan Thorne, 89, British politician, Labour MP for Preston South and Preston (1974–1987).
- Susan Williams-Ellis, 89, British founder of Portmeirion Pottery, bronchial pneumonia.
- Mel Tolkin, 94, American head writer for Your Show of Shows.

=== 27 ===
- Philip Allen, Baron Allen of Abbeydale, 95, British civil servant.
- Bernie Banton, 61, Australian asbestosis compensation campaigner, mesothelioma.
- Robert Cade, 80, American doctor, inventor of Gatorade, kidney failure.
- Jack Eliis, 95, British rugby union player.
- Nicodemus Kirima, 71, Kenyan Roman Catholic Archbishop of Nyeri, kidney failure.
- Kavungal Chathunni Panicker, 86, Indian classical dancer.
- Cecil Payne, 84, American saxophonist, prostate cancer.
- Jane Rule, 76, Canadian author of lesbian-themed works, liver cancer.
- Sean Taylor, 24, American football player (Washington Redskins), homicide by gunshot.
- Bill Willis, 86, American football player (Ohio State, Cleveland Browns) and member of the Pro Football Hall of Fame.

=== 28 ===
- Albert Asriyan, 56, Azerbaijani-born American violinist, composer, arranger and band leader, leukemia.
- Jeanne Bates, 89, American film actress (Eraserhead, Die Hard 2), breast cancer.
- Elly Beinhorn, 100, German pilot and author.
- Fred Chichin, 53, French musician, songwriter and leader of Les Rita Mitsouko, cancer.
- Donyo Donev, 81, Bulgarian cartoonist and animator (The Three Fools).
- Mali Finn, 69, American casting agent (Titanic, L.A. Confidential, The Matrix), cancer.
- Ove Hansen, 77, Danish footballer.
- Tony Holland, 67, British co-creator of EastEnders.
- Bob Simpson, 77, Canadian football player, prostate cancer.
- Petter C. G. Sundt, 62, Norwegian shipping magnate, cancer.
- Ashley Titus, 36, South African rapper and TV presenter ("Mr. Fat"), heart problems.
- James Myles Venne, 89, Canadian northern Saskatchewan First Nations leader.
- Gudrun Wagner, 63, German co-organizer of the Bayreuth Festival, wife of Wolfgang Wagner.

=== 29 ===
- Velikton Barannikov, 69, Soviet Russian boxer and Olympian (1960, 1964).
- James Barber, 84, British-born Canadian cooking show host (The Urban Peasant).
- Ralph Beard, 79, American college basketball player for the University of Kentucky involved in point-shaving scandal and Olympian (1948), heart failure.
- Jaleh Esfahani, 86, Iranian poet.
- Henry Hyde, 83, American member of the US House of Representatives from Illinois (1975–2007).
- Tommy Kron, 64, American basketball player (St. Louis Hawks, Seattle SuperSonics, Kentucky Colonels).
- Jane Lawton, 63, American Democratic Maryland politician, heart attack.
- Jim Nesbitt, 75, American country music singer.
- Michael Shaheen, 67, American government official and attorney.
- Roger Smith, 82, American chairman and CEO of General Motors (1981–1990).

=== 30 ===
- J. L. Ackrill, 86, British philosopher.
- Engin Arık, 59, Turkish physicist, plane crash.
- Seymour Benzer, 86, American genetic biologist, stroke.
- Ian Crawford, 73, Scottish footballer (Hearts).
- Jiří Drvota, 85, Czech Olympic basketball player (1948).
- Pauli Janhonen, 93, Finnish Olympic sports shooter (1948, 1952, 1960).
- Torben Alstrup Jensen, 77, Danish Olympic field hockey player (1960).
- Evel Knievel, 69, American stunt performer.
- Ian MacArthur, 82, British politician, MP for Perth and East Perthshire (1959–1974).
- François-Xavier Ortoli, 82, French President of the European Commission (1973–1977).
- John Strugnell, 77, American biblical scholar, complications from an infection.
