= Herbert J. Valentine =

US Marine Corps officer and flying ace

Herbert James Valentine
- Born: September 12, 1917; Seattle, Washington
- Died: May 3, 1996 (aged 78); King County, Washington
- Burial place: Calvary Cemetery
- Military career
- Allegiance: United States of America
- Branch: United States Marine Corps
- Service years: 1942–1965
- Rank: Major
- Units: VMF-312; VMO-6
- Conflicts: World War II; Battle of the Caribbean; Battle of Okinawa; Korean War; Battle of Pusan Perimeter; Battle of Chosin Reservoir
- Awards: Navy Cross; Distinguished Flying Cross (4)

Herbert James Valentine (September 12, 1917 – May 3, 1996) was a United States Marine Corps officer. He scored six aerial victories as a flying ace during World War II, and was the recipient of the Navy Cross for shooting five enemy planes down in one day.

== Early life ==
Herbert J. Valentine was born on September 12, 1917, in Seattle, Washington. While attending college, Valentine joined the Naval Aviation Cadet Program. In June 1942, he was commissioned as a second lieutenant in the Marine Corps.

== World War II ==
Valentine's first duty station was in St. Thomas in the Virgin Islands, where he spent one year flying anti-submarine patrols. In 1943, he joined Marine Fighting Squadron 312 (VMF-312) and was sent with his squadron to the Pacific Theater, where the squadron would take part in the battle of Okinawa.

On May 25, 1945, Captain Valentine led a division of four F4U Corsairs in a daring attack against 30 Japanese fighter and bomber aircraft which were approaching Okinawa from the north. Valentine is confirmed to have personally shot down five enemy aircraft. He probably shot down a sixth, and he shared a seventh victory with his wingman. For his skilled airmanship in breaking up the Japanese attack, Captain Valentine was awarded the Navy Cross.

A total of 42 enemy aircraft were downed on that day by Marine aviators, with VMF-312 claiming 16 of them. Captain Valentine became the last Marine to earn the title ace in a day during World War II and remains the most recent ace in a day for the Marine Corps.

Valentine was also awarded two Distinguished Flying Crosses during the battle of Okinawa. After the battle, he was given command of Marine Nighter Fighter Squadron VMF(N)-542. He was discharged from the Marines in 1946.

== Korean War ==
Despite being discharged as an officer, Valentine enlisted back into the Marine Corps as a private the same year. In 1950, during the first year of the Korean War, Master Sergeant Valentine flew over 120 missions with Marine Observation Squadron 6 (VMO-6).

On August 6, 1950, Master Sergeant Valentine became the first pilot of VMO-6 to be shot down. His OY-1 aircraft was shot down over the water and he was rescued by South Korean forces. Valentine's squadron launched an extensive search which failed to locate him, but he returned the day after he went missing. He was shot down a second time over enemy territory, but again he managed to evade capture and return to friendly lines. Valentine was awarded two more Distinguished Flying Crosses in Korea.

== Post-Korean War ==
Valentine was again commissioned in 1952, spending much of the remainder of his career flying helicopters. He retired as a major in 1965. Herbert J. Valentine died on May 3, 1996, in King County, Washington. He was buried in Calvary Cemetery in Seattle.

== See also ==
- George C. Axtell
- Jefferson J. DeBlanc
- Archie Donahue
- Jeremiah J. O'Keefe
- John L. Smith
- James E. Swett
