= Lidiya Ivanova =

Lidiya Ivanova may refer to:

- Lidiya Ivanova (gymnast) (b. 1937), Soviet Olympic Gymnast
- Lidiya Ivanova (journalist) (1936–2007), Soviet rower, print and television journalist, television announcer and writer
