= Premier Radio =

Premier Radio may refer to:

- Premier Christian Radio, a radio network in the United Kingdom which broadcasts Christian programming
- Premiere Radio Networks, a radio network in the United States which syndicates talk and other programming to radio stations
