= Bortolazzi =

Bortolazzi is an Italian surname. Notable people with the surname include:

- Bartolomeo Bortolazzi (1773–1820), Italian classical musician, composer, and author
- Etta Bortolazzi (1926–2000), Croatian and Yugoslav theater, radio, TV and film actress
- Mario Bortolazzi (born 1965), Italian footballer and manager

== See also ==
- Bortoluzzi
