= VMA-141 =

Marine Attack Squadron 141
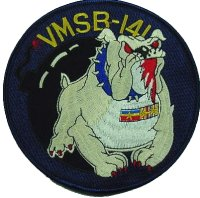
- VMSB-141 Insignia
- Active: 1 March 1942 – 10 September 1945; 5 July 1946 - 1 September 1969
- Country: United States
- Allegiance: United States of America
- Branch: United States Marine Corps
- Type: Fighter squadron
- Role: Air interdiction
- Part of: Inactive
- Engagements: World War II * Battle of Guadalcanal; Korean War

Aircraft flown
- Bomber: SBD Dauntless
- Fighter: F4U Corsair

Marine Attack Squadron 141 (VMA-141) was a reserve fighter squadron in the United States Marine Corps. The squadron fought as part of the Cactus Air Force during the Battle of Guadalcanal in World War II and they also saw service during the Korean War. While with the reserves, they operated out of the San Francisco Bay Area until their deactivation on 1 September 1969.

== History ==
=== World War II ===
Marine Scout Bombing Squadron (VMSB-141) was commissioned on March 1, 1942, at Camp Kearny, San Diego, California. The Squadron was originally formed from personnel from VMSB-132 coming from Marine Corps Air Facility Quantico, Virginia. On August 30, 1942, the squadron departed San Diego for the South Pacific with the first echelon of aircraft arriving at Henderson Airfield, Guadalcanal on September 23, 1942 becoming part of the Cactus Air Force (CAF). On the night of October 13-14, the Japanese battleships Kongō and Haruna shelled the area of Henderson Field from a distance of about 16,000 yards (15,000 m), firing 973 14-inch high-explosive shells. During this bombardment the squadron lost 26 of its 29 aircraft and five officers, including the commanding officer and executive officer. The squadron fought on the island until November 19, 1942, when its flight echelon was transferred to Samoa. The squadron's ground echelon departed on January 19, 1943, bound for Efate in the New Hebrides. During its time with the CAF the squadron lost 18 of its 41 officers killed in action. VMSB-141 remained on Efate until May 1943 when it moved to Auckland, New Zealand. In late September 1943, the squadron returned to the United States arriving at Marine Corps Air Station El Toro, California. In January 1944, the squadron was ordered to Marine Corps Auxiliary Airfield Gillespie in San Diego, CA where it undertook a rigorous syllabus in low-level bombing and strafing utilizing the Vought F4U Corsair.

On 14 October 1944 the squadron was redesignated Marine Fighter Bombing Squadron 141 (VMBF-141). In May 1945 the squadron again changed names. This time they became Marine Torpedo Bombing Squadron 141 (VMTB-141) and served as a training replacement squadron until the end of the war. The squadron was deactivated on 10 September 1945.

=== Post-World War II reserve service ===
Following the war the squadron was reactivated on 5 July 1946, at Naval Air Station Livermore as part of the Marine Air Reserve. On 15 September 1946, it relocated to Naval Air Station Oakland. In 1949 they were commanded by Medal of Honor recipient Colonel James Swett. The squadron moved to Naval Air Station Alameda on 1 July 1962. On that same date it was also redesignated as Marine Attack Squadron 141. The squadron was deactivated on 1 September 1969.

== Notable members ==
- Louis Robertshaw
- Bill Bixby

== See also ==
- United States Marine Corps Aviation
- List of decommissioned United States Marine Corps aircraft squadrons
