= Norwood Russell Hanson =

American philosopher

- Born: August 17, 1924; West New York, New Jersey
- Died: April 18, 1967 (aged 42); Ripley Hill, Cortland County, New York

Education
- Education: University of Chicago, Columbia University, University of Oxford, Cambridge University
- Doctoral advisors: Gilbert Ryle
- Other advisor: H. H. Price

Philosophical work
- Era: 20th-century philosophy
- Region: Western philosophy
- School: Analytic philosophy
- Main interests: Philosophy of science, aeronautics
- Notable works: Patterns of Discovery (1958), The Concept of the Positron (1963)
- Notable ideas: Patterns of discovery, distinction between 'seeing as' and 'seeing that'

Norwood Russell Hanson (August 17, 1924 – April 18, 1967) was an American philosopher of science. Hanson was a pioneer in advancing the argument that observation is theory-laden — that observation language and theory language are deeply interwoven — and that historical and contemporary comprehension are similarly deeply interwoven. His single most central intellectual concern was the comprehension and development of a logic of discovery.

== Life ==
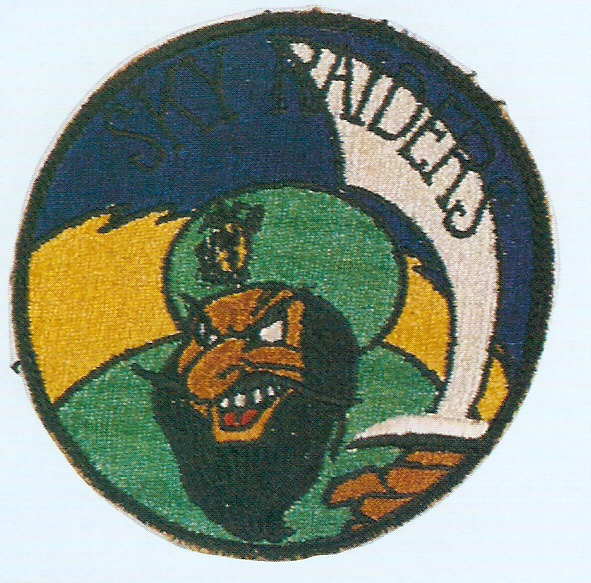
Hanson designed the VMF-452 logo

Hanson was born in 1924 in West New York, New Jersey. He studied trumpet with the legendary William Vacchiano and played at Carnegie Hall, but his musical career was interrupted by World War II. He enlisted in the United States Coast Guard, later transferring to the United States Marine Corps, where he trained as a fighter pilot, developing a reputation as a 'hot pilot' (famously looping the Golden Gate Bridge). He served on the ill-fated USS Franklin in the VMF-452 "Skyraiders" Squadron, for which he designed the unit's logo. When the Franklin was bombed and nearly destroyed on 19 March 1945, his Corsair was described as 'the last plane off Big Ben.'

After flying over 2,000 hours, he returned to civilian life, seeking an education via the G.I. Bill rather than continuing a life in music. He took degrees from the University of Chicago and Columbia University, then proceeded with his new wife Fay to the UK in 1949, under a Fulbright Scholarship. He completed multiple degrees at both Oxford and Cambridge, and stayed in Britain to continue teaching and writing.

Hanson left the life of a Cambridge don to return to the U.S. in 1957, founding the Indiana University Department of History and Philosophy of Science, the first of its kind, and receiving a Fellowship at the Institute for Advanced Study in Princeton, New Jersey. In 1963, Hanson moved to Yale University. He also continued to fly – an AT-6 Texan trainer, and later a Grumman F8F-2 Bearcat. His unusual style and personal history, including his aerobatics over the Yale Bowl and at airshows as 'The Flying Professor,' were noted by a generation of students – including John Kerry. His time at Yale was strained by campus politics, where he was caught in the midst of an infamous 1964-65 fight over Yale's tenure policies (the "Bernstein Affair").

Hanson died in 1967, when his Bearcat crashed in dense fog en route to Ithaca, New York. He was survived by wife Fay and children Trevor (b. 1955) and Leslie (b. 1958). His rich, complex life – ranging from Golden Gloves boxing to drawing illustrations for Homer's Iliad; from camping on a Harley-Davidson to testifying before the U.S. Senate; from tough city youth to distinguished scholarship – was cut short at the age of 42, with ten books in progress, including a history of aerodynamic theory.

== Work ==
Hanson's best-known work is Patterns of Discovery (1958), in which he argues that what we see and perceive is not what our senses receive, but is instead filtered sensory information, where the filter is our existing preconceptions – a concept later called a 'thematic framework.' He cited optical illusions such as the famous old Parisienne woman (Patterns of Discovery, p. 11), which can be seen in different ways. Following Wittgenstein, Hanson drew a distinction between 'seeing as' and 'seeing that' which became a key idea in evolving theories of perception and meaning. He wanted to formulate a logic explaining how scientific discoveries take place. He used Charles Sanders Peirce's notion of abduction for this.

Hanson's other books include The Concept of the Positron (1963). Hanson was a staunch defender of the Copenhagen interpretation of quantum mechanics, which regards questions such as "Where was the particle before I measured its position?" as meaningless. The philosophical issues involved were important elements in Hanson's views of perception and epistemology. He was intrigued by paradoxes, and with the related concepts of uncertainty, undecidability/unprovability, and incompleteness; he sought models of cognition that could embrace these elements, rather than simply explain them away.

Hanson's posthumous works include What I Do Not Believe and Other Essays (1971) and Constellations and Conjectures (1973). He is also known for the essays What I Do Not Believe and The Agnostic's Dilemma, among other writings on belief systems.

From Michael Scriven's preface to Hanson's posthumous Perception and Discovery:

In a general sense Hanson continues the application of the Wittgensteinian approach to the philosophy of science, as Waisman and Toulmin have also done. But he goes much further than they, exploring questions about perception and discovery in more detail, and ... tying in the history of science for exemplification and for its own benefit. Hanson was one of the rare thinkers in the tradition of Whewell – a man he much admired – who could really benefit from and yield benefits for both the history and philosophy of science.

== Influence ==
Hanson's 1958 work Patterns of Discovery was followed by Thomas Kuhn in Kuhn's 1962 landmark, The Structure of Scientific Revolutions, that challenged prevailing conceptions of science's development, conceptions that ranged from the strictures of logical empiricism to scientific realism. Hanson led the move to carry history of science into philosophy of science—two rather divergent fields at the time—as Hanson insisted that proper study of one demanded deep understanding of the other. With Kuhn's contribution, Hanson's interdisciplinary view became generally accepted. However, Hanson's views on science differed from Kuhn's, and Hanson criticized Kuhn's account of paradigm shift because it was conceptually circular and thus impossible to falsify. Similarly, Robert Nozick's 1974 work on political philosophy, Anarchy, State, and Utopia, quotes Norwood to support Nozick's aim to understand the "whole political realm" by "understanding the political realm in terms of the nonpolitical".

== Works ==
Books

- Patterns of Discovery: An Inquiry into the Conceptual Foundations of Science. Cambridge University Press, 1958. ISBN 0-521-05197-5.
- The Concept of the Positron. Cambridge University Press, 1963. ISBN 0-521-05198-3.
- Perception and Discovery: An Introduction to Scientific Inquiry. Freeman, Cooper & Co., 1969 [Wadsworth, 1970]. ISBN 0-87735-509-6.
- Observation and Explanation: A Guide to Philosophy of Science. (Harper Essays in Philosophy) Harper & Row, 1971. ISBN 0-06-131575-3.
- What I Do Not Believe and Other Essays, (Toulmin/Woolf, eds). Synthese Library, D. Reidel, 1971. ISBN 90-277-0191-1.
- Constellations and Conjectures, (Humphreys, ed). D. Reidel, 1973. ISBN 90-277-0192-X.

Other media

- "Philosophy of Science: Observation and Interpretation", Voice of America broadcast from 1964 (recorded 1963), ARC Identifier 106673, Local Identifier 306-FORUM-EN-L-T-6456-I, Record Group 306: Records of the U.S. Information Agency, 1900 - 1992 (cited at https://research.archives.gov/search, retrieved by searching for "philosophy science observation interpretation")

== See also ==
- Theory-ladenness
- American philosophy
- List of American philosophers
