= Bortoluzzi =

Bortoluzzi is an Italian surname. Notable people with the surname include:

- Diego Bortoluzzi (born 1966), Italian footballer and manager
- Ferruccio Bortoluzzi (1920–2007), Italian painter and sculptor
- Jérôme Bortoluzzi (born 1982), French hammer thrower
- Marinella Bortoluzzi (1939–2024), Italian high jumper
- Roberto Bortoluzzi (1921–2007), Italian sports journalist and radio broadcaster
