= VMF-452 =

Marine Fighting Squadron 452
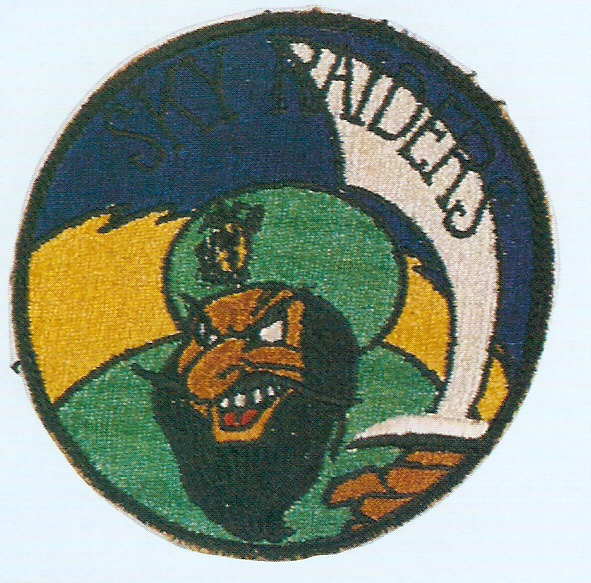
- VMF-452 Insignia
- Active: 31 December 1949
- Country: United States
- Allegiance: United States of America
- Branch: United States Marine Corps
- Type: Fighter squadron
- Role: Air interdiction Close air support
- Part of: Inactive
- Nickname: "Sky Raiders"
- Engagements: World War II * Battle of Okinawa

Commanders
- Notable commanders: George C. Axtell

Aircraft flown
- Fighter: F4U-4 Corsair

Marine Fighting Squadron 452 (VMF-452) was a fighter squadron of the United States Marine Corps that was commissioned and fought during World War II. Known as the "Sky Raiders", they flew the F4U Corsair, and the Grumman TBF Avenger, fell under the command of Marine Carrier Group 5 (MCVG-5) and fought in the Battle of Okinawa. The squadron is best known for being aboard the USS Franklin (CV-13) when she was severely damaged by Japanese kamikaze planes of the coast of Okinawa on 19 March 1945. VMF-452 was deactivated on 31 December 1949 and has remained in an inactive status since.

== History ==
VMF-452 was commissioned at Marine Corps Air Station Mojave, California.

On 7 February 1945, the squadron departed San Francisco on board the aircraft carrier USS Franklin (CV-13). From there they sailed to Pearl Harbor and then moved west to join up with Task Force 58 which was heading to support the invasion of Okinawa. On 18 March they flew their first combat missions against airfields on Kyūshū Island. The following day, the Franklin was attacked by a Japanese Yokosuka D4Y Judy dive bomber. Both of its two 500-pound bombs stuck the Franklin. 33 members of VMF-452 were killed in the ensuing devastation and the squadron was no longer combat effective. They transferred to the USS Bunker Hill and set sail for the United States.

Upon returning to the California, the squadron was sent to Marine Corps Air Station El Centro to refit and rearm in April 1945. They remained there until the end of the war.

== Notable former members ==
- Norwood Russell Hanson

== Unit awards ==
A unit citation or commendation is an award bestowed upon an organization for the action cited. Members of the unit who participated in said actions are allowed to wear on their uniforms the awarded unit citation. VMF-452 was presented with the following awards:

| Ribbon | Unit Award |
|---|---|
| | Asiatic-Pacific Campaign Medal |
| | World War II Victory Medal |
| | National Defense Service Medal |

== See also ==
- United States Marine Corps Aviation
- List of active United States Marine Corps aircraft squadrons
- List of decommissioned United States Marine Corps aircraft squadrons
