= George C. Axtell =

United States Marine Corps general

George Clifton Axtell
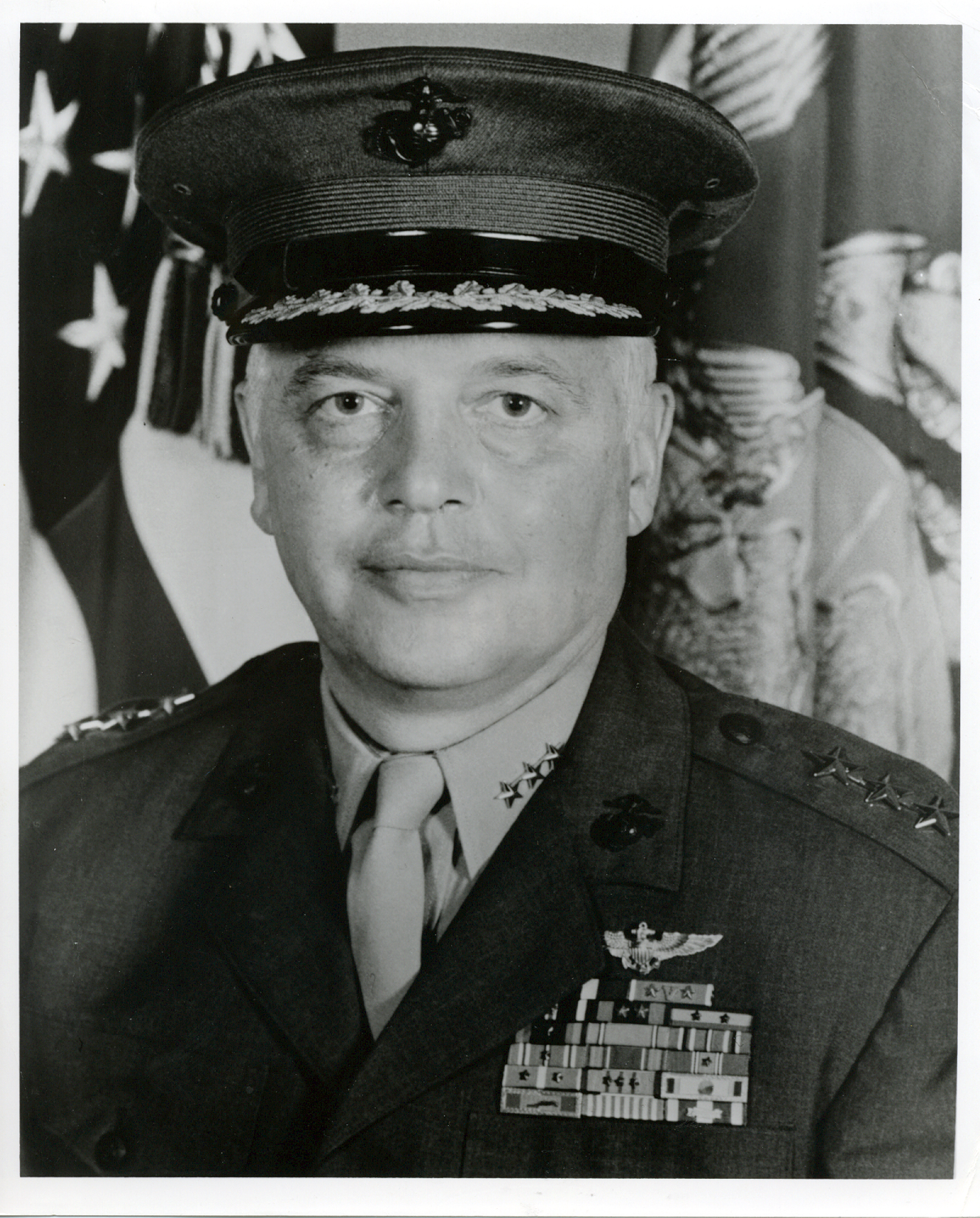
- Lieutenant General George C. Axtell
- Born: November 29, 1920; Ambridge, Pennsylvania, US
- Died: August 20, 2011 (aged 90); Landrum, South Carolina, US
- Military career
- Allegiance: United States
- Branch: United States Marine Corps
- Service years: 1940–1974
- Rank: Lieutenant General
- Nickname: Big Axe
- Commands: VMF-323; Marine Carrier Air Group 16; VMF-452; VMA-312; Marine Air Control Group 1; MAG-12; Force Logistics Command; 2nd Marine Aircraft Wing; Fleet Marine Force–Atlantic
- Conflicts: World War II: Battle of Okinawa; Korean War; Vietnam War
- Awards: Navy Cross; Navy Distinguished Service Medal; Legion of Merit (3) with Combat "V"; Distinguished Flying Cross (2); Air Medal (7)

Lieutenant General George C. Axtell (November 29, 1920 – August 20, 2011) was a United States Marine Corps general officer, a World War II flying ace, and a Navy Cross recipient. During World War II, he was the youngest commanding officer of a Marine fighter squadron. He also served in the Korean War and Vietnam War.

== Early life ==
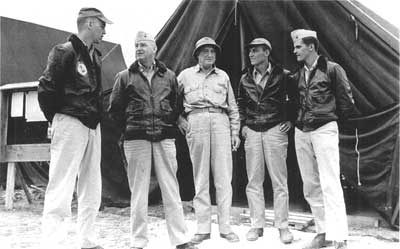
April 1945, the three USMC pilots of the VMF-323 "Death Rattlers" squadron who each scored "ace in a day" on April 22 in the Battle of Okinawa, meeting with two of the USMC's overall commanders (left to right): Maj Axtell (ace), 1st Marine Division CMC Vandegrift, TAF CMC Mulcahy, Maj Dorroh (ace), and Lt O'Keefe (ace)

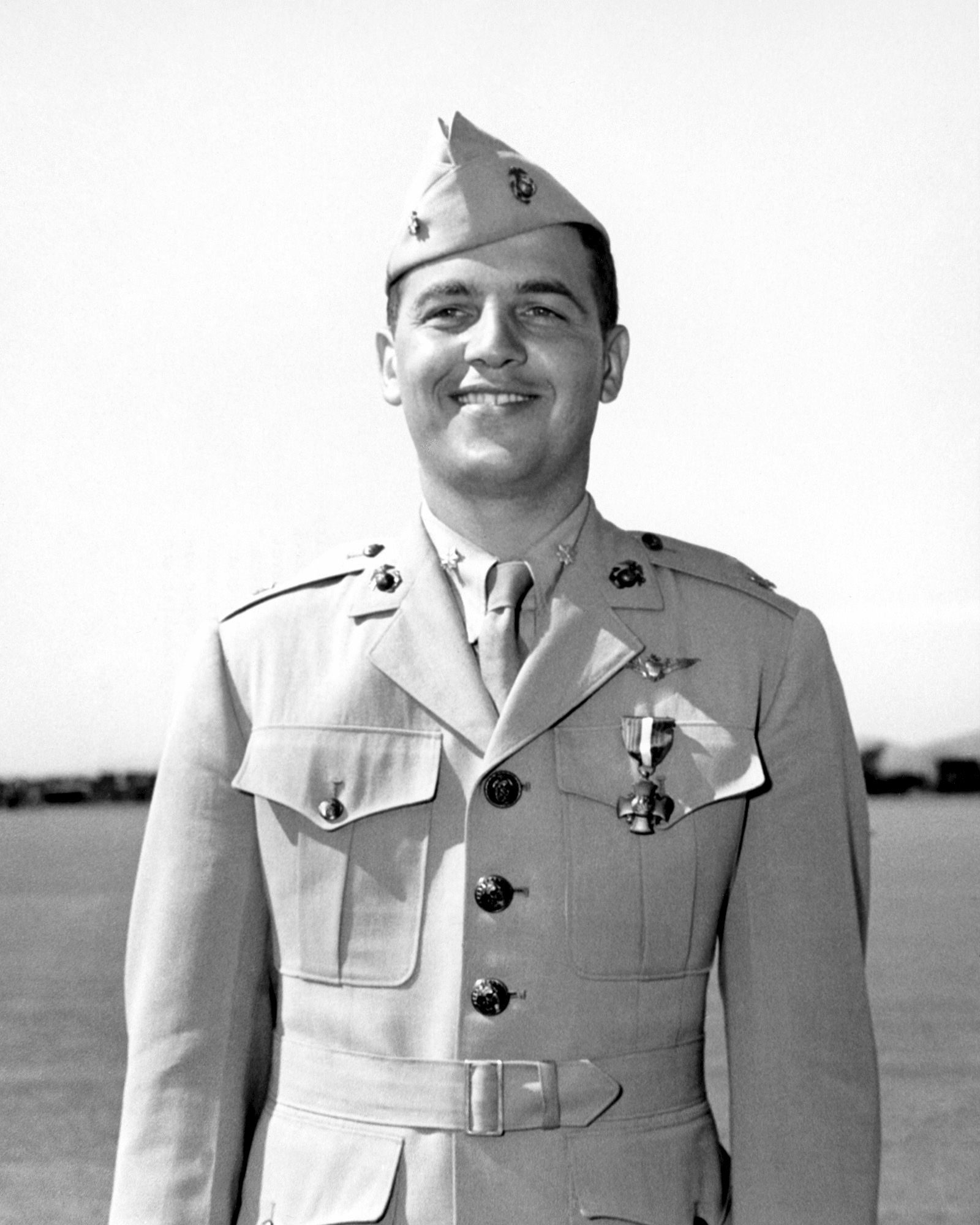
Major Axtell after being awarded Navy Cross

Axtell was born in the Pittsburgh suburb of Ambridge, Pennsylvania, on 29 November 1920 and graduated from high school there in 1938. He attended the University of Alabama before enlisting in the Marine Corps in July 1940 as a Marine Aviation cadet. He held a Bachelor of Laws degree and a Master of Arts degree (comptroller) from George Washington University.

== Military career ==
Axtell was assigned to flight school and was commissioned as a second lieutenant and designated a Naval Aviator in May 1941. From May until December 1941, he was an instructor at Naval Air Station Pensacola, and then was transferred to the U.S. Naval Academy's Postgraduate School where he studied meteorological engineering, graduating in March 1943. He was promoted to first lieutenant in June 1942, and to captain in August 1942.

Promoted to major in May 1943, Axtell saw duty from that July until June 1945, as commanding officer of Marine Fighter Squadron 323 (VMF-323), from the date of its formation at Cherry Point, North Carolina, and then throughout the Okinawa campaign from March to June. During the Okinawa campaign, VMF-323 scored 124 enemy planes led by Axtell who was credited with destroying 6 enemy planes on April 22 with his F4U Corsair and was awarded the Navy Cross for extraordinary heroism. Following the Okinawa campaign, he was assigned as the commanding officer of Marine Carrier Air Group-16, operating from the USS Badoeng Strait. Following the deactivation of MCVG-16 in March 1946, he served as commanding officer of VMF-452 until the following January.

Axtell completed the Junior Course at Marine Corps Schools, Quantico, Virginia, early in 1947, and began his first tour of duty at Headquarters Marine Corps as Naval Aviator Detail Officer, followed by a two-year tour with the Judge Advocate General's Office. He was promoted to lieutenant colonel in January 1951.

In 1952, Axtell was ordered to Korea, where he again saw combat in an F4U Corsair with the 1st Marine Aircraft Wing as tactical officer of Marine Aircraft Group 12, and later, as commanding officer of Marine Attack Squadron 312. He served next with the 2nd Marine Aircraft Wing at Cherry Point, North Carolina, as assistant to the assistant chief of staff, G-3, for a year, then as commanding officer of Marine Air Control Group 1. In 1955, Axtell reported to Headquarters Marine Corps for four years' duty as assistant head of Aviation Training and Distribution Branch, and head of program planning, Division of Aviation. He was promoted to colonel in July 1959.

From 1959 until 1960, Axtell served in Japan as 1st Marine Aircraft Wing legal officer and, later, as commanding officer of MAG-12. Returning to MCAS, Cherry Point, for a three-year period, he was initially assigned as 2nd Wing legal officer and then reassigned as assistant chief of staff, G-3.

After completing the National War College, Washington, D.C., in June 1964, Axtell was assigned in July as chief of staff of Fleet Marine Force, Pacific until September 1965. Ordered to the Far East in September 1965, he served as chief of staff of III Marine Amphibious Force until March 1966 and was awarded the Legion of Merit with Combat "V".

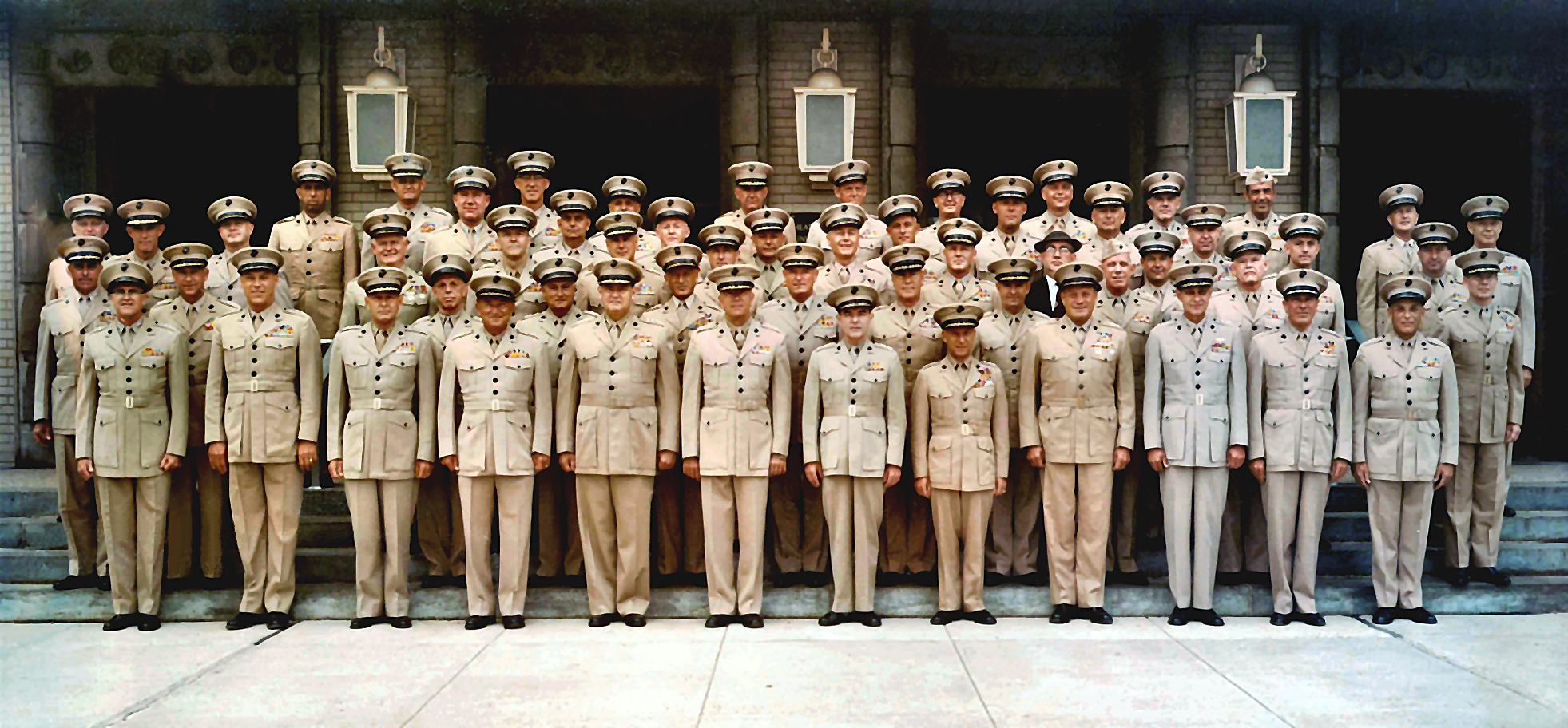
Axtell (4th from right, top row) at the 1967 General Officers Symposium

During March 1966, he organized and commanded the Force Logistics Command, Fleet Marine Force, Pacific, located in South Vietnam, until October 1966. He was awarded a second Legion of Merit with Combat "V" for exceptionally meritorious conduct during this assignment.

Upon his return to the United States in December 1966, he was promoted to the rank of brigadier general, and assigned to Headquarters Marine Corps. For his service as assistant chief of staff, G-4, from December 1966 until June 1970, he was awarded a third Legion of Merit medal. He was promoted to major general on 7 August 1969.

From late June 1970 to March 1972, he served as commanding general of 2nd Marine Aircraft Wing, Cherry Point, North Carolina.

On 10 March 1972, it was announced that President Nixon had nominated Axtell for appointment to the grade of lieutenant general and assignment as the commanding general of Fleet Marine Force, Atlantic, in Norfolk, Virginia. He was advanced to three-star rank on 1 April 1972. He received the Navy Distinguished Service Medal upon his retirement on 1 September 1974.he died in 2011

== Military awards and decorations ==
Axtell's awards and decorations include:

Naval Aviator insignia
1st Row	Navy Cross		Navy Distinguished Service Medal	
2nd Row	Legion of Merit w/ Combat "V" and two gold 5/16 inch stars	Distinguished Flying Cross w/ one gold 5/16 inch star	Air Medal w/ one silver and one gold 5/16 inch star	Presidential Unit Citation w/ two bronze service stars
3rd Row	Navy Unit Commendation w/ one bronze service star	American Defense Service Medal	American Campaign Medal	Asiatic-Pacific Campaign Medal w/ one bronze campaign star
4th Row	World War II Victory Medal	National Defense Service Medal w/ one bronze service star	Korean Service Medal w/ two bronze service stars	Vietnam Service Medal w/ three bronze service stars
5th Row	Republic of Korea Presidential Unit Citation	Vietnam Gallantry Cross Unit Citation w/ palm	United Nations Service Medal	Vietnam Campaign Medal

=== Navy Cross citation ===
Citation:

The President of the United States of America takes pleasure in presenting the Navy Cross to Major George Clifton Axtell, Jr. (MCSN: 0-6857), United States Marine Corps, for extraordinary heroism and distinguished service in the line of his profession as Commanding Officer and Pilot in Marine Fighting Squadron THREE HUNDRED TWENTY-THREE (VMF-323), Marine Air Group THIRTY-THREE (MAG-33), FOURTH Marine Aircraft Wing, in aerial combat against enemy Japanese forces in the Okinawa Area, on 22 April 1945. Intercepting an overwhelming force of hostile planes, Major Axtell led his squadron in a daring and skillful attack against the enemy who were threatening our Fleet units, shooting down five hostile planes, probably destroying three others and damaging three additional aircraft. By his gallant fighting spirit and expert airmanship, Major Axtell enabled our fighters to deliver a crushing blow to the Japanese without loss of aircraft or injury to our personnel, and his devotion to duty reflects the highest credit upon himself and the United States Naval Service.

== See also ==
- United States Marine Corps Aviation
- Jefferson J. DeBlanc
- Archie G. Donahue
- Jeremiah J. O'Keefe
- James E. Swett
- John L. Smith
- Herbert J. Valentine
