= Muyiwa Olarewaju =

British Gospel singer and songwriter

Muyiwa Olarewaju OBE (born 26 November) is a British gospel singer and songwriter who mixes traditional gospel music with elements of world music (from Africa, the Caribbean and Asia), soul, R&B and pop. He is also a performer, broadcaster and presenter. In 2009 he became the first international act to perform on America's entertainment channel, BET, for the annual Celebration of Gospel show. He has presented the Turning Point programme to an estimated global audience of 70 million. With his group Riversongz, he sold out Indigo2 at the O2 in London, the first gospel act to do so, and he has played at the largest gospel music event in the world, The Experience, attracting a 500,000 strong audience.

== Broadcast/presenter career ==
As a broadcaster Muyiwa has presented on Premier Radio's flagship programmes Gospel Tonight and Worship Tonight. Muyiwa has also held the position of station director of Premier Gospel, the number-one Gospel music station in the UK, boasting a listenership of 180,000 a month.

Muyiwa is the Host of the Turning Point television show, a programme with a global audience reach of 70 million.

Muyiwa has appeared as a celebrity judge for five seasons on the BBC Songs of Praise, Gospel Choir of the Year Competition.

== Personal life ==
Born in London, he lived for the first few years of his life in Nigeria with his headmaster father and his radio broadcaster mother. When he was nine, he and his brothers and sisters were sent to live with a series of friends and family in London, so that they could receive a better education. The first place he lived was Stamford Hill, with an uncle.

Living a more settled life with his older sister in a council flat in Forest Gate, he taught himself piano. He left Brixton's Archbishop Tennyson School in 1988, then took a BTEC National Diploma in Business and Finance. He proceeded to take an HND in Business Studies at East London University and a Music Degree at Westminster University.

== Career ==
Muyiwa is the Leader of Riversongz. As a collective they have toured with Stevie Wonder and individually have worked with Emelie Sandy, Pixie Lot and Amy Winehouse. Muyiwa & Riversongz were the first international artists to appear on the American BET channel at the annual "Celebration of Gospel" in 2009.

Muyiwa & Riversongz have released five albums — Restoration (2003); Declaring His Power (2005), recorded at the Liverpool Lighthouse Liverpool Lighthouse, the UK's first dedicated Urban Gospel arts centre; Declaring His Love (2008), recorded at the Ocean music venue in Hackney (now picture house), the album staying at number 1 on HMV's Jazz & Blues chart for five months; Live at the O2 (2010) as the first UK gospel group to sell out the Indigo 2 venue; and Declaring His Name All Around The World (2012).

The Eko Ile Album released in 2015 was produced by the Ghanaian musician, guitarist, keyboardist, producer, recording- engineer and multi-instrumentalist. Kwame Yeboah. Recorded mostly at the Mixstation studios in Accra Ghana and the rest in Riversongz Studios in London.

In 2017 Muyiwa released the No One Like you album a compilation of already released songs with a special composition featuring philanthropist and pastor Reverend Mother Esther Abimbola Ajayi.

Olarewaju was appointed Officer of the Order of the British Empire (OBE) in the 2020 Birthday Honours for services to music.

== Discography ==
Albums:

- Muyiwa & Riversongz: Live at the Apollo (2012): a CD and DVD project recorded live before a sold-out audience at London's prestigious Eventim Apollo.
- Declaring His Name All Around the World (2011): the first studio album from Muyiwa & Riversongz, produced by the Grammy Award-winning Kevin Bond, hit No. 5 on Amazon's World Music Charts.
- Declaring His Love (2008): recorded Live in London in 2007 at the Ocean Hackney to a sold-out audience, Declaring His Love reached No. 1 on the HMV Jazz & Blues Charts and remained there for five months. The release of the project was followed by a 10-city sold-out UK tour.
- Declaring His Power (2005): Recorded live in Andfield at the Liverpool Football Grounds, this album release licensed to Kingsway Music was followed by a SOLD OUT ten city UK tour.
- Restoration (2002): Muyiwa & Riversongz's debut album restoration, recorded in 2002 before a live audience in London, England. It featured an all-star band including Steve Turner, (Kylie Minogue), Andrew Smith MD (West Life), Chris Brown (Kylie Minogue) and Julian Brown (Jason Donovan).
- Eko Ile (2015)
- No One Like You (2017)

Live DVDs

- Muyiwa & Riversongz: Live at the Apollo (2012)
- Declaring His Love (2008)
- Declaring His Power (2005)
- Restoration (2002)

Awards

YEAR	AWARD GIVING BODY	AWARD
2006	Oasis Awards	Best Radio Presenter
2009	GMA	Best Gospel Radio Show
2009	GMA	Most Contribution To UK Gospel
2010	Oraclez World Music Awards	Best UK
2010	Star Gospel Music Awards	International Artist of the Year
2010	GMA	Best Male
2011	AGMA	Special Contribution to Gospel Music
2011	KGA	Best International Act
2013	AGMA	Contribution to Promotion of Gospel

== See also ==
- British Black Gospel
