= Archie Donahue =

Archie Glenn Donahue
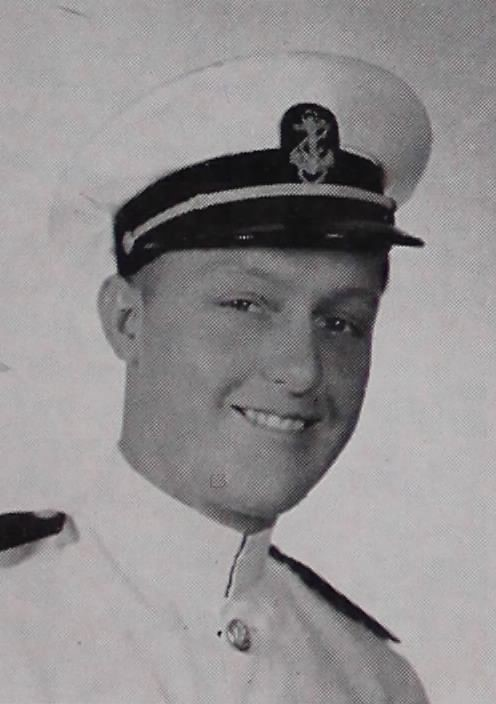
- Donahue as US Navy Midshipman (1941)
- Born: October 24, 1917; Casper, Wyoming, U.S.
- Died: July 30, 2007 (aged 89); Rio Hondo, Texas, U.S.
- Military career
- Allegiance: United States of America
- Branch: United States Navy; United States Marine Corps
- Service years: 1941–1958
- Rank: Colonel
- Units: VMF-112; VMF-451
- Conflicts: World War II: Guadalcanal Campaign; Battle of Okinawa
- Awards: Navy Cross; Distinguished Flying Cross (3); Air Medal (5)

Archie Glenn Donahue (October 24, 1917 – July 30, 2007) was a decorated American combat pilot and a United States Marine Corps fighter ace during World War II. He shot down a total of 14 Japanese planes during the war, including five in a single day.

== Early life and career ==
Archie G. Donahue was born in Casper, Wyoming, on October 24, 1917. He studied engineering at the University of Texas before joining the United States Navy in March 1941. Ensign Donahue earned his wings three days before the attack on Pearl Harbor. Shortly after, he transferred to the Marine Corps.

Second Lieutenant Donahue was assigned to Marine Fighting Squadron 112 (VMF-112). While training other pilots in aerial gunnery, Donahue was nearly killed when the tail of his F4F Wildcat was sheared off in a midair collision over Marine Corps Air Station El Toro. Donahue bailed out almost immediately, but was underneath his plane and was afraid to deploy his parachute. He deployed his parachute 150 feet above the ground and sustained no injuries.

== Solomon Islands campaign ==
On November 2, 1942, Donahue's squadron joined the Cactus Air Force at Henderson Field on Guadalcanal. Donahue scored his first aerial victory, a Zero, on November 14. Donahue quickly contracted malaria and was sent to Sydney, Australia to recover. As soon as he was well again, Donahue returned to Guadalcanal.

On May 13, 1943, Donahue's flight engaged in a one hour long dogfight west of Florida Island. Donahue possibly became an ace in a day, as he was confirmed to have shot down four Zeros, and probably shot down a fifth. A fellow Marine verified the fifth kill, but Donahue was never credited for it. Tragically, Donahue's wingman, Otto Seifert, was killed in the dogfight.

Two days later, Donahue claimed two more victories, but was forced to make an emergency landing in the Russell Islands when his plane was hit by enemy fire. After landing, Donahue was forced to take cover when Japanese fighters started strafing him. Promoted to captain, Donahue scored nine aerial victories during the Solomon Islands campaign.

== Battle of Okinawa ==
In February 1944, Donahue was assigned to the newly formed Marine Fighting Squadron 451 (VMF-451) at Marine Corps Air Station Mojave. The squadron was attached to the USS Bunker Hill, taking part in raids over mainland Japan and supporting the Marine landings at Iwo Jima. The squadron then participated in bombing missions on Okinawa, just prior to the invasion. Several Marines with the squadron were shot down and killed, and Donahue was made the executive officer.

On April 12, 1945, Major Donahue finally earned the title of ace in a day, personally shooting down three Vals and two Zekes with his F4U Corsair off the coast of Okinawa. This feat made Donahue the first carrier-based Marine ace in a day. Donahue was awarded the Navy Cross for his actions that day, and the award was personally presented to him by Vice Admiral Marc Mitscher.

On the morning of May 11, Donahue had just returned from a flying mission when the USS Bunker Hill was struck by two kamikazes and over 390 sailors and Marines were killed, including one pilot from VMF-451. Donahue survived the kamikaze attack unscathed, but the attack ended the war for his squadron. He finished the war with 14 aerial victories to his credit. Besides his Navy Cross, Major Donahue was awarded three Distinguished Flying Crosses and five Air Medals.

== Post-war ==
Donahue continued serving in the Marine Corps after the war, retiring as a colonel in 1958. From 1981 to 1991, he worked for the Confederate Air Force, an organization devoted to restoring World War II aircraft.

Archie G. Donahue died on July 30, 2007, in Rio Hondo, Texas. He was subsequently cremated.

== See also ==
- George C. Axtell
- Jefferson J. DeBlanc
- Jeremiah J. O'Keefe
- John L. Smith
- James E. Swett
- Herbert J. Valentine
