= James E. Swett =

United States Marine Corps Medal of Honor recipient

James Elms Swett
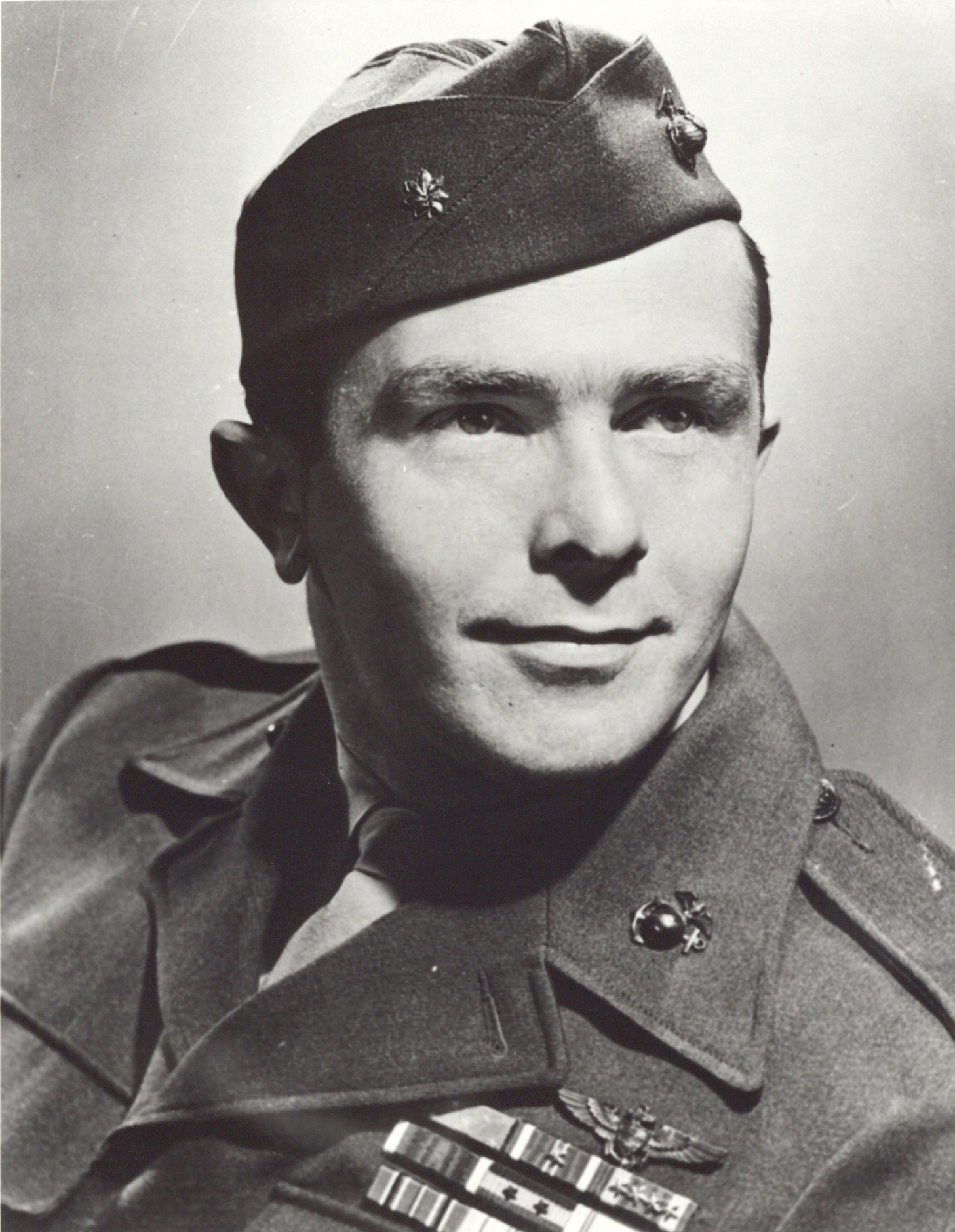
- Swett in March 1949
- Born: June 15, 1920; Seattle, Washington, U.S.
- Died: January 18, 2009 (aged 88); Redding, California, U.S.
- Burial place: Northern California Veterans Cemetery, Igo, California
- Military career
- Allegiance: United States of America
- Branch: United States Navy (1941–42); United States Marine Corps (1942–70)
- Service years: 1941–1970
- Rank: Colonel
- Unit: VMF-221
- Commands: VMF-141
- Conflicts: World War II: Battle of Guadalcanal; Battle of Iwo Jima; Battle of Okinawa
- Awards: Medal of Honor; Distinguished Flying Cross (2); Purple Heart; Air Medal (5)

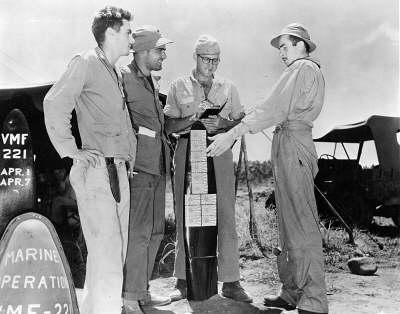
Lieutenant James E. Swett and other members of VMF-221

James Elms Swett (June 15, 1920 – January 18, 2009) was a United States Marine Corps fighter pilot and flying ace during World War II. He was awarded the United States' highest military decoration, the Medal of Honor, for actions while a division flight leader in VMF-221 over Guadalcanal on April 7, 1943. Over the course of the war he flew 103 combat missions, downed a total of 15.5 enemy aircraft and survived being shot down near New Georgia, earning two Distinguished Flying Crosses and five Air Medals.

== Early life ==
Born on June 15, 1920, in Seattle, Washington, James E. Swett graduated from San Mateo High School, San Mateo, California, and enrolled at the College of San Mateo in 1939, where he earned a private pilot's license. He enlisted in the U.S. Naval Reserve as a seaman second class on August 26, 1941, and started flight training in September.

== Military career ==
=== Service in World War II ===
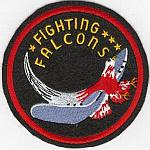
VMF-221

Swett completed flight training in early 1942, placing in the top ten percent of his class. He was given the option to choose between a commission in the Marine Corps or the Navy, and he chose the Marine Corps. He was commissioned as a second lieutenant at NAS Corpus Christi, Texas, on April 1, 1942. He continued his advanced flight training, first at Quantico, Virginia, then at Lake Michigan, became carrier qualified aboard the USS Wolverine, and finally received his wings at San Diego, California. In December 1942, he shipped out to the Southwest Pacific, and when he arrived at Guadalcanal he was assigned to VMF-221, which was part of Marine Air Group 12.

=== Medal of Honor action ===
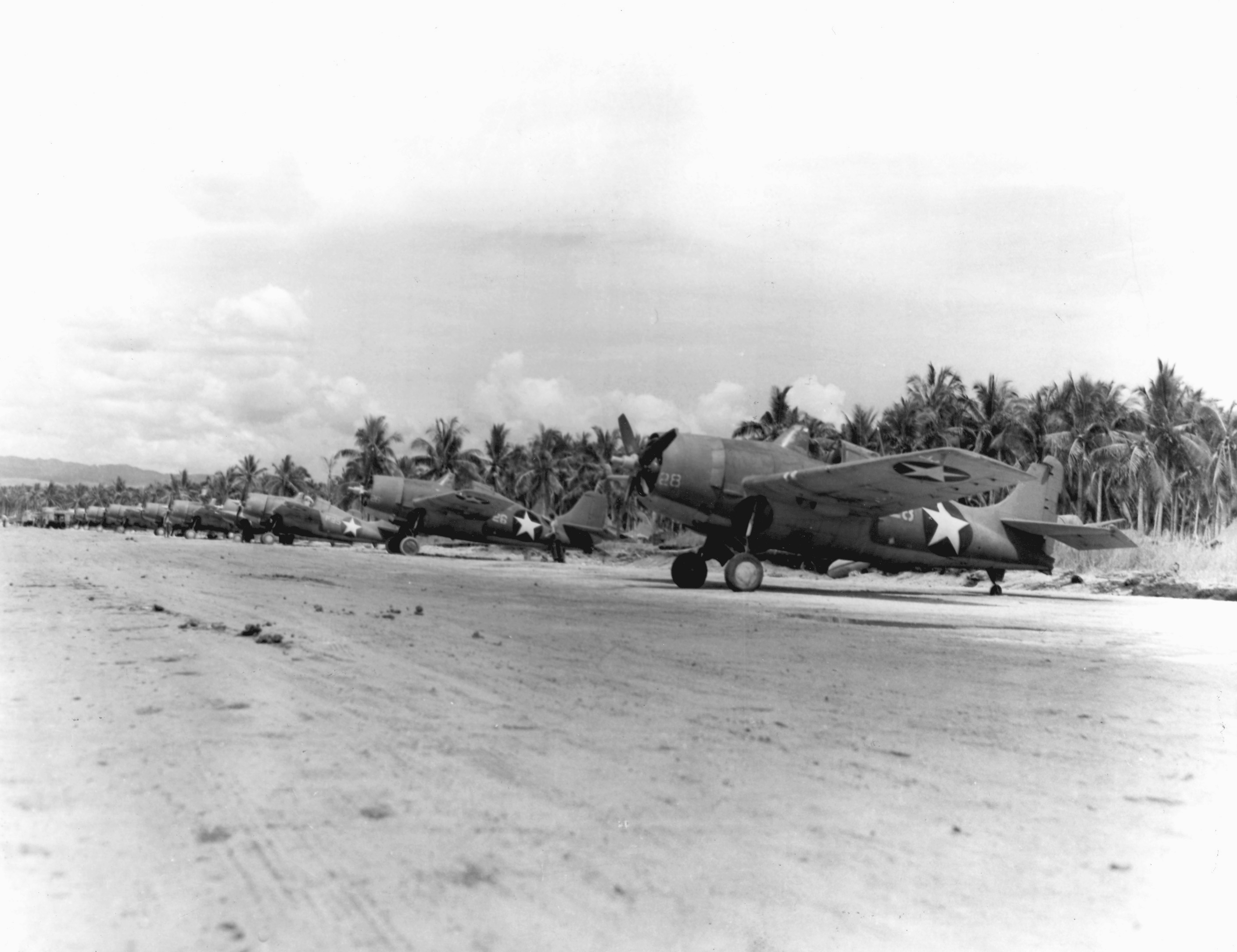
F4F Wildcats in Henderson Field at Guadalcanal

On April 7, 1943, on his first combat mission, Swett both became an ace and acted with such "conspicuous gallantry and intrepidity at the risk of his life above and beyond the call of duty" that he was awarded the Medal of Honor.

His first mission was as a division leader on a combat air patrol over the Russell Islands early on the morning of April 7 in expectation of a large Japanese air attack. Landing to refuel, the four-plane division of Grumman F4F Wildcats he was leading was scrambled after other aircraft reported 150 planes approaching Ironbottom Sound, and intercepted a large formation of Japanese Aichi D3A dive bombers (Allied code name: "Val") attacking Tulagi harbor.

When the fight became a general melee, Swett pursued three Aichi D3A Vals diving on the harbor. After he had downed two, and while he was evading fire from the rear gunner of the third, the left wing of his F4F Wildcat was holed by U.S. antiaircraft fire. Despite this, he downed the third Val and turned toward a second formation of six Vals leaving the area.

Swett repeatedly attacked the line of dive bombers, downing each in turn with short bursts. He brought down four and was attacking a fifth when his ammunition was depleted and his cockpit was shot up by return fire. Wounded, he decided to ditch his damaged fighter off the coast of Florida Island, after it became clear that his oil cooler had been hit and he would not make it back to base. After a few seconds his engine seized, and despite initially being trapped in his cockpit underwater, Swett extricated himself and was rescued in Tulagi harbor after ditching his plane. This feat made the 22-year-old Marine aviator an ace in a day on his first combat mission.

=== Further combat service ===
Swett returned to Guadalcanal after a short stay in a Naval hospital and learned that Admiral Marc Mitscher had nominated him for the Medal of Honor. After a short rest in Australia, Swett checked out in the Vought F4U Corsair to which VMF-221 was converting and moved to a new base in the Russells. Promoted to captain, Swett covered the Rendova landings on June 30, 1943, adding two Mitsubishi G4M "Betty" medium bombers to his score and sharing the downing of a Mitsubishi A6M Zero.

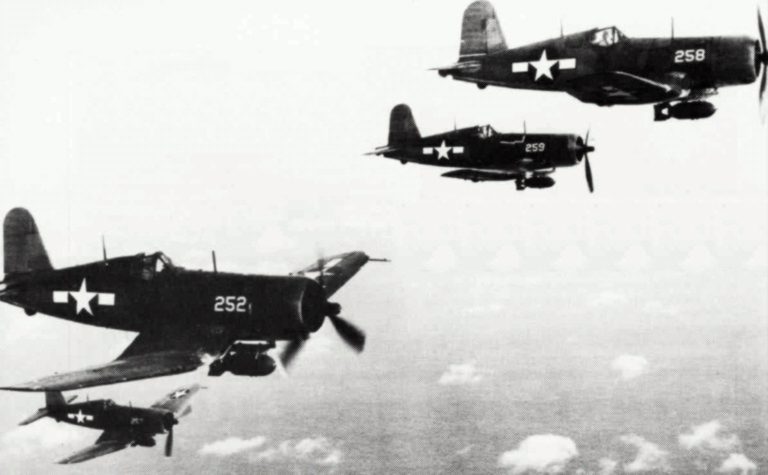
USMC F4U-1s in-flight

Eleven days later, near the island of New Georgia, Swett downed two more Bettys. Seeing his wingman's Corsair under attack, he also shot down a Zero. However, he failed to see a second Zero and was himself shot down. He was rescued by indigenous tribal members in a canoe and traveled by ten-man canoe for several hours to an Australian coast watcher's location. A PBY flying boat returned Swett to the Russells. In October 1943, over the major Japanese airbase at Kahili, Bougainville, Swett added one confirmed Zero and one probable, but lost his wingman. In November, he added to his list of kills two more Vals and a possible Kawasaki Ki-61 Tony, a new Japanese fighter.

On December 11, Swett returned to the United States on a Dutch motor ship, arriving in San Francisco on New Year's Eve. After less than 24 hours, he shipped out to San Diego, where he was granted a 30-day leave and married Lois Anderson, his longtime sweetheart. Swett was then transferred to NAS Santa Barbara, California, where he worked up a newly manned VMF 221 in the Corsair.

Now carrier-qualified and assigned to the USS Bunker Hill, Swett flew two strikes over Japan and then supported the landings at Iwo Jima and the operations on Okinawa. On May 11, 1945, he shot down a Yokosuka D4Y Judy kamikaze, which he described as a "sitting duck". Swett watched from the air as the Bunker Hill was struck by two kamikazes, causing such damage that he was forced to land on another carrier.

Swett later returned to the States and was assigned to MCAS El Toro, California, where he began to train for Operation Olympic, the invasion of Japan. At war's end, VMF 221 was second in aerial victories among Marine Corps squadrons with 185 enemy planes downed. Swett's combat record includes 103 combat missions, 15.5 confirmed victories and four probables. He earned the Purple Heart, two Distinguished Flying Crosses, and the Medal of Honor.

=== Post-war service ===
After returning to the U.S. he served with VMF-221 at MCAS El Toro, California.

Swett commanded VMF-141 flying Corsairs at NAS Alameda, California, following the end of World War II. After the onset of the Korean War his squadron was deployed to Korea, but he was left behind because the Navy thought putting a Medal of Honor recipient in combat was too risky. Swett left active duty and continued service in the Marine Corps Reserve, retiring in 1970 at the rank of colonel.

== Post-military life ==
Swett was married to Lois Anderson from January 20, 1944, until her death on December 5, 1999. They had two sons, James Jr. and John, both of whom went on to become Marine Corps officers. Swett later married Verna Gale McPherson Miller in 2007.

Swett worked in his father's company in San Francisco, making marine pumps and turbines. In 1960, after his father's death, Swett took over the company and ran it for 23 years, before passing it on to his son. Swett moved to Trinity Center, California, in his retirement and became a frequent speaker at schools, where he shared his strong feelings about the values of respect and responsibility.

In 2006, Swett's Medal of Honor action was recreated using computer graphics for The History Channel series Dogfights in episode Guadalcanal and Swett himself provided commentary. The episode first aired on November 24, 2006.

Swett moved to Redding, California, in 2007 and died there on January 18, 2009, in a Redding hospital from heart failure after a lengthy illness. He was buried with full military honors at Northern California Veterans Cemetery in Igo, California.

The airport in Trinity Center, California was named in his honor.

== Awards and decorations ==
His awards and decorations include:

Naval Aviator Badge
Medal of Honor	Distinguished Flying Cross w/ one 5/16" Gold Star	Purple Heart
Air Medal w/ four 5/16" Gold Stars	Combat Action Ribbon	Navy and Marine Corps Presidential Unit Citation w/ two 3/16" Bronze Stars
Navy Unit Commendation	American Defense Service Medal	American Campaign Medal
Asiatic-Pacific Campaign Medal w/ one 3/16" silver star and one 3/16" bronze star	World War II Victory Medal	Armed Forces Reserve Medal w/ silver hourglass device

=== Medal of Honor citation ===
The President of the United States takes pleasure in presenting the MEDAL OF HONOR to

FIRST LIEUTENANT JAMES E. SWETT
UNITED STATES MARINE CORPS RESERVE for service as set forth in the following CITATION:

For conspicuous gallantry and intrepidity at the risk of his life above and beyond the call of duty, as a division leader in Marine Fighting Squadron TWO TWENTY-ONE in action against enemy Japanese aerial forces in the Solomon Islands Area, April 7, 1943. In a daring flight to intercept a wave of 150 Japanese planes, First Lieutenant Swett unhesitatingly hurled his four-plane division into action against a formation of fifteen enemy bombers and during his dive personally exploded three hostile planes in mid-air with accurate and deadly fire. Although separated from his division while clearing the heavy concentration of anti-aircraft fire, he boldly attacked six enemy bombers, engaged the first four in turn, and unaided, shot them down in flames. Exhausting his ammunition as he closed the fifth Japanese bomber, he relentlessly drove his attack against terrific opposition which partially disabled his engine, shattered the windscreen and slashed his face. In spite of this, he brought his battered plane down with skillful precision in the water off Tulagi without further injury. The superb airmanship and tenacious fighting spirit which enabled First Lieutenant Swett to destroy eight enemy bombers in a single flight were in keeping with the highest traditions of the United States Naval Service.

/S/ FRANKLIN D. ROOSEVELT

== See also ==
- List of Medal of Honor recipients
- Other "ace in a day" Marine Corps pilots:
  - George C. Axtell
  - Jefferson J. DeBlanc
  - Archie Donahue
  - Jeremiah Joseph O'Keefe
