= François van Kruisdijk =

Dutch swimmer

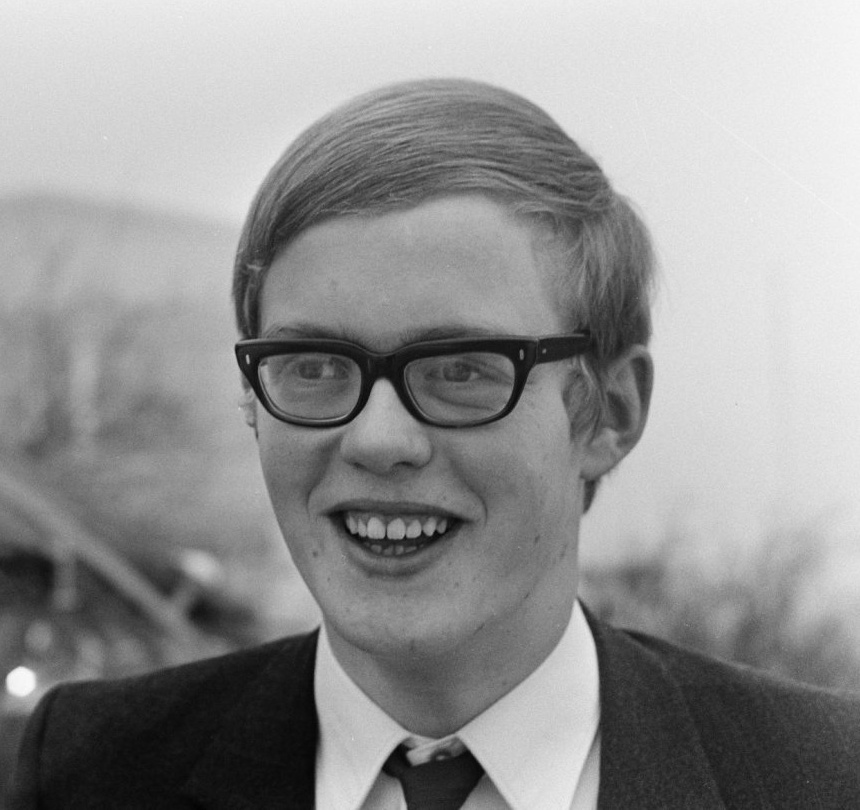
- François van Kruisdijk in 1970

Personal information
- Born: 25 May 1952 Eindhoven, the Netherlands
- Died: 5 November 2007 (aged 55) Eindhoven, the Netherlands
- Height: 1.79 m (5 ft 10 in)
- Weight: 73 kg (161 lb)

Sport
- Sport: Swimming
- Club: PSV, Eindhoven

François Henricus van Kruisdijk (25 May 1952 – 5 November 2007) was a Dutch swimmer. He competed in the 200 m individual medley event at the 1972 Summer Olympics, but failed to reach the final.
