= Ove Hansen (footballer, born 1929) =

Danish footballer

Personal information
- Date of birth: 29 November 1929
- Date of death: 28 November 2007 (aged 77)

International career
Years	Team	Apps	(Gls)
1956–1957	Denmark	9	(0)

Ove Hansen (29 November 1929 – 28 November 2007) was a Danish footballer. He played in nine matches for the Denmark national football team from 1956 to 1957.
