= Premier Christian Radio =

British Christian radio station

- London; United Kingdom
- Frequencies: DAB: 11A; MW: 1305 kHz; MW: 1413 kHz; MW: 1566 kHz; Freeview: 725; Sky (UK only): 0123

Programming
- Format: Christian radio, Contemporary Christian music

Ownership
- Owner: Premier Christian Media Trust

History
- First air date: 10 June 1995; 30 years ago
- Former frequencies: MW: 1332 kHz

Links
- Webcast: Listen live
- Website: premierchristianradio.com

Premier Christian Radio is a British Christian radio station, part of Premier (a Christian communications organisation), owned by the charity Premier Christian Media Trust.

Premier Christian Radio broadcasts Christian programming, including news, debate, teachings and Christian music across the United Kingdom.

== History ==
Premier Christian Radio was founded in 1994, broadcasting exclusively on medium wave to a Greater London audience when it also began its telephone counselling service, Premier Lifeline. It took the air at a launch party in Battersea Park, London on 10 June 1995.

A series of magazine titles then joined. The charity produces Premier Christianity, Premier Youth and Children's work, and Premier Woman Alive.

In 2001, Premier Christian Radio received an official warning from the Radio Authority for broadcasting "items that were offensive to people of other, non-Christian beliefs". A "yellow card" warning was issued, recognising that Premier had acknowledged its errors and put in place significant new compliance measures to ensure such breaches would not be repeated.

In the months of April to July 2014 Premier Christian Radio reached its biggest-ever audience in its near twenty years history. RAJAR figures showed a weekly reach for the period of 240,700 people in London and the South East of England, and also showed that each listener tuned in for an average of 10.1 hours each week. This boost followed on from a rebranding exercise in the beginning of 2014, and a new website which included listen-again features and breaking news. As of March 2021, reach and listening had fallen back to 121,000 people and 3.5 hours per week.

== Availability ==
=== Medium wave AM ===
It operates on three frequencies on medium wave across five transmitters:

- 1305 (Stevenage, Bishop's Stortford, Harlow, Hertford, Crawley, Guildford, Reigate and Woking)
- 1413 (Maidenhead, Camberley, Staines, Harrow, Watford, Chelmsford, Brentwood, Dartford, Maidstone and Sevenoaks)
- 1566 (Guildford)

The station was also broadcast on 1332 kHz in London, until July 2019.

=== Digital DAB, Freeview and internet ===
Premier Christian Radio was at first only available on medium wave in London. It later added broadcasts on the internet via its website, via its mobile app, Freeview channel 725 (UK and Ireland), Sky Digital (channel 0123, terminated 14 December 2012), Virgin Media (channel 968, terminated 6 May 2009) and London DAB - a national DAB broadcast was added later. In 2006, the media group launched Premier.tv, one of the first Christian IPTV channels in the UK.

Its 2007 application for a national DAB licence, as part of the National Grid Wireless consortium, was refused; Premier Radio said "almost 72,000 Premier listeners stepped up and made their voices heard in supporting the bid". In August 2009, Premier achieved its target of meeting the £650,000 yearly fee to broadcast on the national Digital One DAB multiplex and launched on the multiplex on 21 September 2009. In 2016, it moved its DAB transmission to the SDL national multiplex which is lower cost but has less complete national coverage.

=== Premier Gospel ===
Premier Gospel was launched as a DAB spin-off station in 2010, taking the London DAB slot vacated by the parent service's move to D1. Premier Gospel launched the Premier Gospel Awards in 2016.

=== Premier Praise ===
A second sister station, Premier Praise!, playing contemporary Christian pop and rock, launched on 27 March 2016 as part of the Sound Digital national DAB multiplex. It will be available on SDL alongside the core Premier service, which completes its migration over from Digital 1 to SDL in April.

== Listenership ==
Premier Christian Radio's supporters come from many different Christian denominations, including those from the Anglican, Baptist, Catholic, Evangelical, Methodist and Pentecostal churches.

In 2004, The Sunday Times placed Premier Christian Radio at number one in a chart of the "most upmarket stations" based upon the percentage of its audience (81%) that was ABC1. In the quarter ending June 2010 the station was receivable by 10,983,000 people; 143,000 listened, for an average of 12 hours each, 0.80% of all listening hours.

As of September 2023, the station has a weekly audience of 101,000 listeners according to RAJAR.

== Presenters ==
- Rob Frost, English Christian evangelist and author
- Cindy Kent, former singer with the 1960s folk group The Settlers.
- Muyiwa Olarewaju
- John Pantry, 1970s singer and music producer.
- Pam Rhodes
- Noël Tredinnick, Principal Conductor of the All Souls Orchestra.
