= The Urban Peasant =

Canadian cooking show

The Urban Peasant is a Canadian cooking show starring James Barber. The show was broadcast on CBC Television and was filmed at the CBC Regional Broadcast Centre at CBUT in Vancouver, British Columbia. The show also aired in the United States on (TLC).

== Broadcasters ==
=== Past ===
- CBC - original broadcast
- Food Network Canada - syndicated reruns
- One: the Body, Mind & Spirit channel - syndicated reruns
- Ion Life Channel - syndicated reruns

== Books ==
For a complete listing of books by James Barber see his list of books

Barber has written a number of books, including several companion books to this series:

- The Urban Peasant: Recipes from the Popular Television Cooking Series (1995, ISBN 0-8038-9370-1)
- Peasant's Choice: More of the Best from the Urban Peasant
- Peasant's Choice (1994, ISBN 0-9698398-2-0)
- The Urban Peasant: More than a Cookbook (1993, ISBN 0-9694144-0-4)
- The Urban Peasant Quick & Simple (1991)
