= James Barber (author) =

Canadian writer (1923–2007)

- Born: March 23, 1923; Dover, Kent, England
- Died: November 29, 2007 (aged 84); Duncan, British Columbia, Canada
- Occupations: Author; television host
- Years active: 1971–2006
- Known for: The Urban Peasant
- Spouse: Christina Burridge
- Website: www.theurbanhub.com

James Barber (March 23, 1923 – November 29, 2007) was a Canadian cookbook author and host of The Urban Peasant, a CBC cooking show.

== Biography ==
Barber was born in Dover, England, in 1923. After serving in the Royal Air Force in World War II, he immigrated to Canada in 1952, working as an engineering consultant before becoming a theatre critic in Vancouver. His first book was Ginger Tea Makes Friends (1971), which combined cartoon drawings with recipes. Flash in the Pan (1981) was the first of his nineteen full fledged cookbooks, upon which his television show was based.

From 1992 to 2000, Barber hosted The Urban Peasant, a cooking show that aired on CBC and was syndicated in more than 120 countries. Barber was known as an "effusive" host who injected "saucy banter" into his program, which featured simple dishes prepared unpretentiously. Following his retirement, Barber lived on a farm in the Cowichan Valley of Vancouver Island, and married his longtime companion Christina Burridge after a twenty year courtship. The couple had met when Burridge appraised Barber's collection of some 1,300 cookbooks.

Barber died of natural causes at his farm in Duncan, British Columbia, on November 29, 2007, age 84. At the time of his death, he was reading a cookbook with a pot of chicken soup simmering on the stove.

== Bibliography ==
- Ginger Tea Makes Friends (Illustrated) (1971 McClelland and Stewart ISBN 0-7710-1007-9)
- Fear of Frying (1978 Douglas & McIntyre ISBN 0-88894-281-8)
- Ginger Tea Makes Friends (1982 Madrona Publishing ISBN 0-88894-148-X)
- Flash in the Pan (1982 Douglas & McIntyre Ltd ISBN 0-88894-331-8)
- James Barber Mushrooms Are Marvellous (1984 Douglas & McIntyre Ltd.; First edition ISBN 0-88894-444-6)
- James Barber's Personal Guide to the Best Eating in Vancouver (1985 North Country Book Express ISBN 0-932722-10-5)
- James Barber's Immodest but Honest Good Eating Cookbook (1986 Solstice Press ISBN 0-932722-12-1)
- Urban Peasant (1991 Raincoast Book Dist Ltd ISBN 0-9694144-0-4)
- Urban Peasant Quick & Simple Cookbook (1993 Urban Peasant Productions ISBN 0-9697123-0-8)
- The Urban Peasant: Recipes from the Popular Television Cooking Series (1994 Hasting House Publishing ISBN 0-8038-9370-1)
- Peasant's Choice (1994 Urban Peasant Productions ISBN 0-9698398-2-0)
- Peasant's Choice: More of the Best from the Urban Peasant Recipes from the Popular Television Cooking Series (1995 Hasting House Publishing ISBN 0-8038-9370-1)
- Peasant's Alphabet: More of the best from the Urban Peasant (1997 Urban Peasant Productions ISBN 0-9698398-4-7)
- Cooking for Two: The Urban Peasant (1999 Macmillan Press ISBN 0-7715-7634-X)
- Ginger Tea Makes Friends (2000 Raincoast Book Dist Ltd ISBN 1-55192-284-3)
- Flash in the Pan (2000 Raincoast Book Dist Ltd ISBN 1-55192-312-2)
- Fear of Frying (2000 Raincoast Book Dist Ltd ISBN 1-55192-310-6)
- Chef's Salad: Greens, Vegetables, Pasta, Bean, Seafood, Potato (2003 ISBN 1-55285-419-1) James Barber (foreword)
- One-Pot Wonders: James Barber Recipes for Land and Sea (2006 Harbor ISBN 1-55017-378-2)
