= Lauren S. McCready =

- Born: July 26, 1915; Pelham Manor, New York
- Died: November 15, 2007 (aged 92); Redding, Connecticut
- Military career
- Allegiance: USMS
- Service years: 34 years
- Rank: Admiral
- Awards: Department of Commerce Gold Medal

Rear Admiral Lauren S. McCready (July 26, 1915 – November 15, 2007) was one of the builders and founders of the United States Merchant Marine Academy, "Kings Point."

He graduated from New York University in 1937 with a degree in mechanical engineering, soon after he received his marine engineers license. He continued to work as a ship's third engineer until 1940 when he entered the Maritime Officers Training School at Fort Trumbull. Shortly after graduation he joined the Washington, D.C. staff of the United States Maritime Commission as a Cadet Training Instructor.

In February 1942 he was assigned to partake in the acquisition and conversion of the Walter P. Chrysler estate on Long Island into the newly commissioned Kings Point Merchant Marine Academy. He was the first head of the Engineering Department, and created the Engineering Department virtually from scratch while overseeing the design and construction of Fulton Hall. Over a 29 year period he brought the Engineering Department its first accreditation, founded a nuclear engineering curriculum, led the officer training for the first nuclear-powered cargo ship, the NS Savannah, and earned his own Senior Nuclear Reactor Operator's License. He retired from full-time teaching in 1970, but continued to teach as an adjunct until 1975.

In 1971, McCready was appointed the first director of the National Maritime Research Center at Kings Point, a department he helped establish. He served there for three years before retiring from federal service in 1975.

McCready is the recipient of the Department of Commerce Gold Medal and the Engineers of Distinction Award. In 1981 he was designated an honorary alumnus of the Academy, and in 1983 he was named professor emeritus. A major laboratory area in Fulton Hall bears McCready's name.

Admiral McCready was an honorary alumnus of the United States Merchant Marine Academy, and recipient of an honorary doctorate. Admiral McCready was exceptionally proud of the accomplishments of Kings Point graduates, and attended Homecoming every year, where his presentation "Kings Point: The Early Years" was a popular sell-out. One of his most remarkable records was that he watched over 21,000 Kings Pointers receive their diplomas, participating in every commencement ceremony from the first class to cross a King Point campus stage in 1942 through 2005.

In 1973, after several travels to France, he wrote a thesis for the degree of Master of Science (History of Sciences) entitled "the Invention and Development of the Gnome Rotary aero engine - the work of Louis and Laurent Seguin". He was given by the Seguin family the first model of the Gnome engine, and gave it to the Smithsonian Institution (Washington) where it is exhibited.

== Career accomplishments ==
- Admiral McCready taught engineering at the Academy from 1941 to 1975.
  - B.S.M.E., M.M.E., New York University
  - M.S., Polytechnic University
- Licenses:
  - Chief Engineer of Steam Vessels, Unlimited Horsepower
  - First Assistant Engineer, Diesel Vessels, Unlimited Horsepower
