= Rob Frost =

English Christian evangelist

Revd Dr. Rob Frost (27 April 1950 – 11 November 2007) was an English Christian evangelist, broadcaster and author who founded the Share Jesus International missionary agency. He was national evangelist for the Methodist Church of Great Britain from 1986 to 2007.

== Early life ==
Robert William Frost was born in Yorkshire. His father, Ronald Frost, was a Methodist minister, who inspired him to become an evangelist. He trained as a Methodist minister himself at Hartley Victoria College in Manchester in the early 1970s.

His first ministerial posting was for three churches in the Pontefract area in 1975 before moving to Tooting, London, in 1979, from where he went on to continue his Methodist ministry around south London. He founded the huge Methodist celebration, Easter People in 1988, and was its executive Director for almost 20 years. He and some close friends had used their life-savings to fund the deposit on Camber Sands holiday camp where the first event was held. With 900 attending, it was a success, and the savings were repaid. Tens of thousands of people took part in the following years, with speakers and performers who included Dr Donald English, Adrian Plass, Simeon Wood, Rev Dr Howard Mellor, Dr Elaine Storkey, Revd Professor David Wilkinson, Paul Field, Springs Dance Company and the Methodist Youth Brass Band. After gaining his PhD from King's College London in 1995, Dr Frost lectured in mission and evangelism at London School of Theology and several other theological institutions throughout the UK.

== Broadcasting and media ==
Dr Frost wrote more than twenty theological and devotional books, including a handful of Christian novels and presented Frost on Sunday on Premier Radio for many years.

He used his media presence to advance the cause of Release International, a charity which campaigns on behalf of persecuted Christians and of which he was Honorary President from 2004.

== Death and legacy ==
Frost was diagnosed with skin cancer in June 2007 and began treatment. He was taken into hospital on 7 November 2007, as his condition worsened and shortly later died from liver failure as a result of a secondary melanoma, aged 57. He is survived by his wife Jacqui, and his sons Chris and Andy.

Over 2,000 people attended his memorial service at Methodist Central Hall, Westminster, on 12 January 2008.

== Published Works ==
Books

- Visions, with music by Paul Field, Moorley's Print & Publishing, 1986. ISBN 978-0-86071-263-3
- Break Me, Shape Me: Working Out Commitment in the Real World, Marshall Pickering, 1986. ISBN 978-0-551-01326-1
- Breaking Bread, Eastbourne: Kingsway Publications, 1988. ISBN 978-0-86065-591-6
- Pilgrims, Eastbourne: Kingsway Publications, 1990. ISBN 978-0-86065-814-6
- Gospel End, Minstrel, 1991. ISBN 978-0854763228
- Broken Cross, Eastbourne: Kingsway Publications, 1992. ISBN 978-1-85424-190-0
- Burning Questions, Monarch Books, 1994. ISBN 978-1-85424-259-4
- When I Can't Pray, Eastbourne: Kingsway, 1995.
- Thinking Clearly About God and Science, with David A Wilkinson, Crowborough: Monarch Publications, 1996. ISBN 978-1-85424-333-1
- Which Way for the Church?, Eastbourne: Kingsway, 1997. ISBN 978-0-85476-717-5
- A New Start?: Hopes and Dreams for the New Millennium, with David Wilkinson, London: Hodder & Stoughton, 1999. ISBN 978-0-340-71389-1
- Hopes and Dreams: a novel, London: Monarch, 1999. ISBN 978-1-85424-426-0
- Sharing Jesus in a New Millennium: a Practical Introduction to Evangelism for Christians Everywhere, Bletchley: Scripture Union, 2000. ISBN 978-1-85999-305-7
- Here & Now: Living the Beatitudes in Today's World, Crusade for World Revival, 2001. ISBN 978-1-85345-236-9
- A Closer Look at New Age Spirituality, Eastbourne: Kingsway, 2001. ISBN 978-1-84291-006-1
- Five Things I Wish they'd Told Me When I Became a Christian, Milton Keynes: Authentic, 2006. ISBN 978-1-85078-670-2
- Doing the Right Thing, Oxford: Monarch, 2008. ISBN 978-1-85424-838-1
- Pentecost: the Church has Left the Building, with Andy Frost & M. H. Williamson, Milton Keynes: Authentic Media, 2008. ISBN 978-1-85078-781-5
- Sharing Jesus: the Church's Most Urgent Task, with Scripture Union, Bletchley: Scripture Union, 2008. ISBN 978-1-84427-356-0
- The Call and the Commission : the Challenge of How the Church Equips a New Generation of Leaders for a Different World, with Joanne Cox & David Wilkinson, Milton Keynes: Paternoster, 2009. ISBN 978-1-84227-608-2

Bible Study Guides

- Conversation Starters (Beginnings), Bible Society, 1983. ISBN 978-0-564-07033-6
- Big Questions (Beginnings), Bible Society, 1983. ISBN 978-0-564-07043-5
- Go for Growth (Beginnings), Bible Society, 1987. ISBN 978-0-564-07993-3
- People at Work: students handbook, Exeter: Pergamon, 1988. ISBN 978-0090363462
- People at Work: leaders handbook, Exeter: Pergamon, 1988. ISBN 978-0-08-036347-9
- Jesus in the Third Millennium : Advent Reflections on the Son of God, Oxford: Bible Reading Fellowship, 2000. ISBN 978-1-84101-080-9
- Essence: Exploring Spirituality, Eastbourne: Kingsway, 2002. ISBN 978-1-84291-111-2
- A Journey through Advent, Farnham: Crusade for World Revival, 2004. ISBN 978-1-85345-312-0
- The Way of the Cross, Farnham: Crusade for World Revival, 2005. ISBN 978-1-85345-353-3
- The Prodigal Son: Amazing Grace, Farnham: Crusade for World Revival, 2006. ISBN 978-1-85345-412-7
