= James Myles Venne =

James Myles Venne (died November 28, 2007) was a northern Saskatchewan First Nations leader. He served as chief of the Lac La Ronge First Nation from 1971 to 1983 and then again from 1985 to 1987. He also served 18 years as a senator of the Federation of Saskatchewan Indian Nations. He died at his home at the age of 89.
