= Roberto Bortoluzzi =

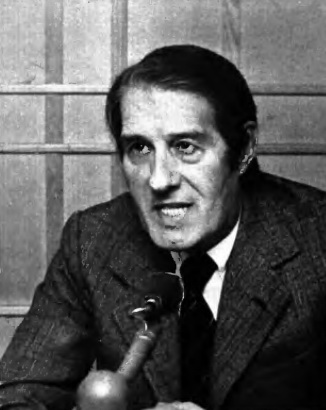
Roberto Bortoluzzi, 1974.

Roberto Bortoluzzi (28 January 1921 – 5 November 2007) was an Italian sports journalist and radio broadcaster. He was best known as the host of Tutto il calcio minuto per minuto, a live radio show covering Italian football (soccer).

== Biography ==
Bortoluzzi was born on 28 January 1921 in Portici, Italy. His parents were employed as an architect and an engineer. He attempted an initial career in the Italian army with a goal of becoming an officer in the Italian navy. However, he switched careers when he decided to become a journalist and began working for the RAI in 1944. The 1954 FIFA World Cup in Switzerland gave him his first opportunity in sports broadcasting.

He began to collaborate with Italian sports commentators, Nando Martellini and Niccolò Carosio on stories about Italian domestic football. He helped found Tutto il calcio minuto per minuto together with Sergio Zavoli and Guglielmo Moretti. Bortoluzzi hosted the show from 3 February 1959 until 1987, a total of 28 years, which set a hosting record in Italian broadcasting, which has yet to be surpassed as of 2007.

Bortoluzzi officially retired from the show in 1987 and was succeeded by Massimo De Luca. De Luca was replaced by Alfredo Provenzali in 1992.

Bortoluzzi died on 5 November 2007 in the Nervi region of Genoa.
