= Jefferson J. DeBlanc =

United States Marine Corps Medal of Honor recipient

Jefferson Joseph DeBlanc
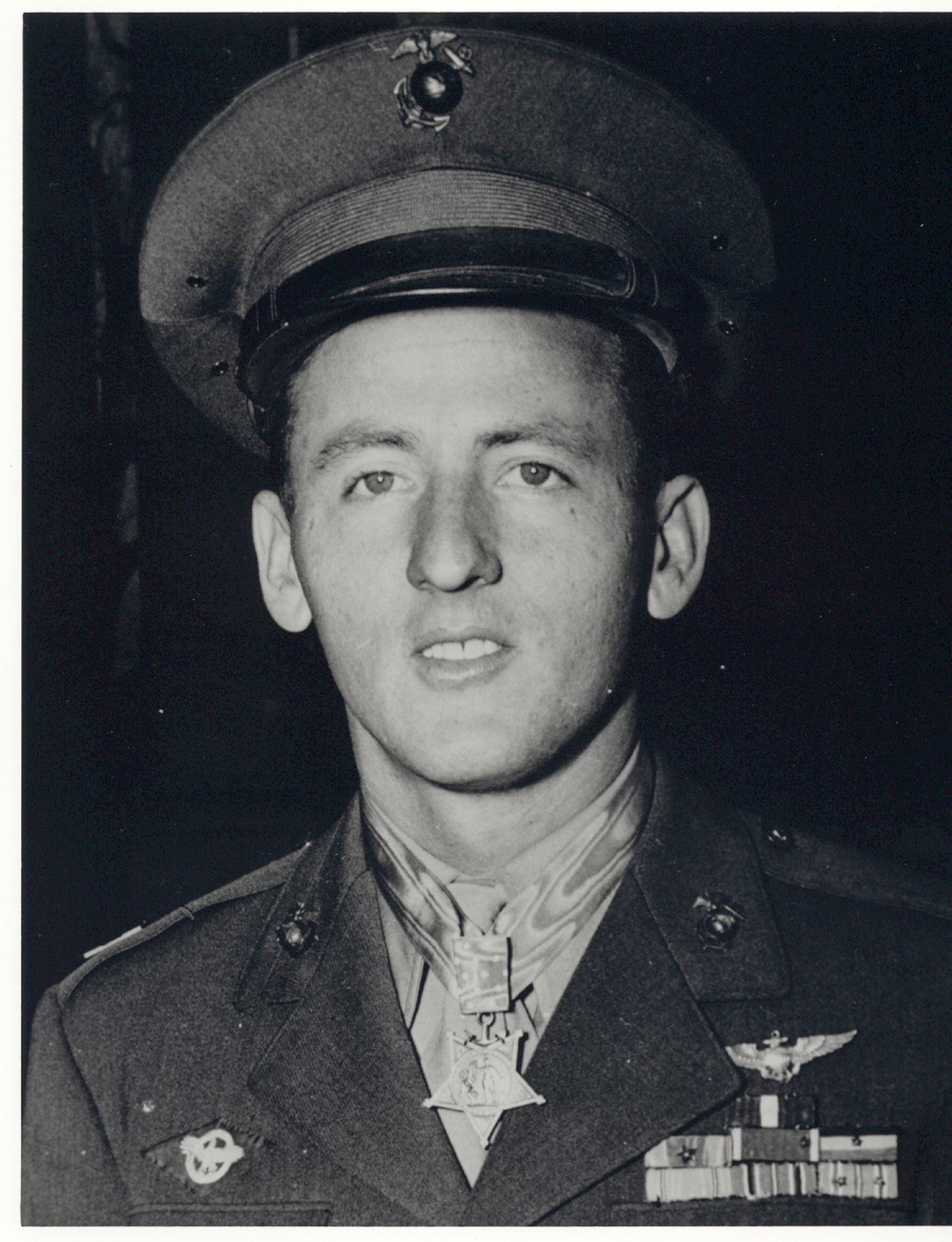
- Born: February 15, 1921; Lockport, Louisiana, U.S.
- Died: November 22, 2007 (aged 86); Lafayette, Louisiana, U.S.
- Burial place: Saint Michael's Cemetery, Saint Martinville, Louisiana
- Military career
- Allegiance: United States of America
- Branch: United States Navy (1941–42); United States Marine Corps (1942–45); United States Marine Corps Reserve (1945–72)
- Service years: 1941–1972
- Rank: Colonel
- Unit: VMA-112
- Conflicts: World War II
- Awards: Medal of Honor; Distinguished Flying Cross; Purple Heart; Air Medal (5)
- Other work: Teacher – math and physics

Jefferson Joseph DeBlanc (February 15, 1921 – November 22, 2007) was an American World War II Marine Corps fighter pilot and flying ace, credited with shooting down nine Japanese aircraft during two tours of duty in the Pacific at Guadalcanal and Okinawa. On January 31, 1943, despite mechanical problems with his aircraft, he pressed forward with a mission and shot down five Japanese aircraft in minutes before being shot down himself. DeBlanc parachuted to safety and was rescued by native islanders, traded for a sack of rice, and picked up by a Navy seaplane. He received the Medal of Honor for his actions that day. He served in the Marine Corps Reserve until 1972. In that time, he also taught school and completed graduate and master degrees in math, physics, and a doctoral degree in education.

== U.S. Naval service ==
DeBlanc enlisted in the United States Navy Reserve (USNR) as a seaman second class on 29 July 1941, and received flight training at the Naval Reserve Aviation Base in New Orleans, for two weeks, before going to the Naval Air Station in Corpus Christi, Texas, to continue his training. His Naval enlistment was terminated under honorable conditions on 15 October, and he was appointed an Aviation Cadet, USNR, on the following day. DeBlanc was one of approximately 24,500 Cajun G.I.s to serve during World War II.

== Marine Corps service ==
Commissioned as a second lieutenant in the Marine Corps Reserve on 4 May 1942, DeBlanc moved to San Diego to join Headquarters Squadron, 2nd Marine Aircraft Wing. In July, he was assigned to the Advance Carrier Training Group, where he remained under instruction until 6 August.

He was placed in the new pilot's pool until, with less than 10 hours of flight time in the F4F Wildcat, he joined VMF-112, Marine Aircraft Group 11, 1st Marine Aircraft Wing in October. Two weeks later, he left for overseas and arrived at Guadalcanal on 2 November. On 13 November, Japanese Mitsubishi G4M "Betty" bombers attempted to torpedo Allied ships and were intercepted by VMF-112, and in that action DeBlanc shot down three. He was promoted to first lieutenant on 19 December. On 29 January 1943, DeBlanc was forced to ditch his Wildcat and luckily landed in the wake of an American destroyer that was fleeing across Ironbottom Sound due to a Japanese air raid. He was rescued by the destroyer and returned to flight status immediately after.

=== Medal of Honor action ===
On 31 January, First Lieutenant DeBlanc was flying a Wildcat over Japanese-held Kolombangara island in the Solomons Islands leading eight F4F Wildcats from VMF-112 on an escort mission for a strike force of 12 Douglas SBD Dauntless dive bombers sent to attack Japanese shipping. En route to the target area, DeBlanc discovered and reported to Guadalcanal that his fighter had developed a serious fuel leak which made return to base unlikely and he requested that rescue forces be alerted.

Leading the escorts directly to the target area, DeBlanc and the other Wildcats observed a pair of Mitsubishi F1M "Pete" float planes attacking the Dauntlesses from above and behind, and he dove to disrupt their attack. DeBlanc's aircraft was fired at by the rear gunners on the "Petes", but he maneuvered evasively and pressed home an attack on the first, exploding it, then maneuvered and took the second under fire, hitting it in the fuel tanks and setting it afire. Although the SBDs hit their targets successfully, and the escort mission was completed, DeBlanc remained in the target area to cover the withdrawal of the Dauntlesses, despite a critically low fuel supply, and began a climb back to altitude.

By this time, night was falling, but DeBlanc observed a formation of Nakajima Ki-43 "Oscar" Imperial Japanese Army fighters headed for the dive bombers. Surprising them from beneath, he damaged one and shot down its wingman when the latter left the formation. The others broke off their attack of the dive bombers and turned on the Wildcats. DeBlanc and his wingman attempted to defend themselves using the Thach Weave, but his wingman swung too wide during the maneuver and was shot down. DeBlanc himself was saved when a third Wildcat flown by Lt. James Lavell Secrest, approaching from head-on, overflew his aircraft and forced a pursuing "Oscar" to dive away.

DeBlanc attempted to disengage but was attacked by two more "Oscars". He turned towards them in a climbing head-on attack, and the first exploded in the exchange of fire. The second maneuvered behind him, however, but DeBlanc managed to slow his Wildcat abruptly and force his remaining opponent to overshoot him, and he also shot it down for his fifth victory of the day. DeBlanc was then surprised by a fighter he had not detected. Rounds struck his aircraft, ripped his wrist watch from his arm, smashed the instrument panel, and set afire the Wildcat's engine. DeBlanc was forced to bail out at low altitude over Vella Gulf near Japanese-held Kolombangara. The total time of the action from arrival in the target area to his own bailout was approximately five minutes.

Landing in the sea, DeBlanc discovered that he was badly wounded in the back, arms and legs. Supported only by his life jacket, he swam for the beach. After six hours in the water, he reached shore, and for three days subsisted on coconuts he found in an abandoned hut while his wounds went unattended. He was taken by a group of indigenous people who bartered him for a sack of rice to another tribe that hid him and cared for his wounds. When one of the natives grabbed his belt buckle, he responded by grabbing one of their spears, which he kept until his passing. The spear is now displayed at The National WWII Museum in New Orleans. The tribal members carried DeBlanc by outrigger canoe to the home of an Anglican missionary, who forwarded him to two Coastwatchers, who immediately attempted contact with the Allied authorities by clandestine radio. On 12 February, three days before his 22nd birthday, a Navy PBY Catalina patrol bomber landed in the sea off the island and tribal members paddled DeBlanc out to it in a canoe. He was flown back to his base and to the hospital.

(Note: the chronology and aircraft types are those provided by DeBlanc for the recreation of this action and vary slightly from the citation, which is reproduced below. The Japanese Ki-43 was often mistaken for the A6M Zero fighter in the heat of combat.)

=== Further wartime service ===
Promoted to captain on 1 June, he was transferred to VMF-122, Marine Aircraft Group 11, in July, and returned to the United States about six weeks later. Assigned to Headquarters Squadron 41, Marine Base Defense Air Group 41, Marine Corps Air Station El Toro, Santa Ana, California, DeBlanc remained with that unit until December 1943, when he was transferred to Headquarters Squadron, Marine Aircraft Group 32. Two months later he rejoined Marine Base Defense Air Group 41. After one month with them, DeBlanc was assigned to VMF-461, Marine Base Defense Air Group 43 at El Centro, California.

In November 1944, Captain DeBlanc returned to the Central Pacific for a second tour of overseas duty. He flew with VMF-422 in the Marshall Islands until May 1945, when he was transferred to VMF-212, engaged in the Okinawa campaign. He continued flying in the Ryukyus until the end of the war, shooting down one more Japanese plane to bring his total to nine. He returned to the U.S. in October 1945 and was detached to Naval Air Station in Seattle, Washington.

== Aerial victory credits ==
Chronicle of aerial victories
Date	#	Type	Location	Aircraft flown	Unit Assigned
November 12, 1942	2	Mitsubishi G4M	Guadalcanal, Solomon Islands	F4F Wildcat	VMF-112
December 18, 1942	1	Mitsubishi F1M	Guadalcanal, Solomon Islands	F4F Wildcat	VMF-112
January 31, 1943	2; 3	Mitsubishi F1M; Nakajima Ki-43	Vella Gulf, Solomon Islands	F4F Wildcat	VMF-112
May 28, 1945	1	Aichi D3A	Yokoate-jima, Japan	F4U Corsair	VMF-212

== Awards and decorations ==
On December 6, 1946, DeBlanc was presented the Medal of Honor by President Harry S. Truman in the White House "for conspicuous gallantry and intrepidity at the risk of his life above and beyond the call of duty" for his actions in the Solomon Islands on January 31, 1943.

In addition to the Medal of Honor, DeBlanc holds the Distinguished Flying Cross; the Purple Heart; the Air Medal with four gold stars in lieu of second through fifth award; Presidential Unit Citation with one bronze star; Asiatic-Pacific Campaign Medal with three bronze stars; American Campaign Medal and the World War II Victory Medal.

United States Naval Aviator Badge
Medal of Honor
Distinguished Flying Cross	Purple Heart	Air Medal w/ four 5/16" gold stars
Navy Presidential Unit Citation w/ 3/16" bronze star	American Defense Service Medal	American Campaign Medal
Asiatic-Pacific Campaign Medal w/ three 3/16" bronze stars	World War II Victory Medal	Navy Occupation Service Medal w/ 'Japan' clasp
National Defense Service Medal	Armed Forces Reserve Medal w/ silver hourglass	Marine Corps Reserve Ribbon

=== Medal of Honor citation ===
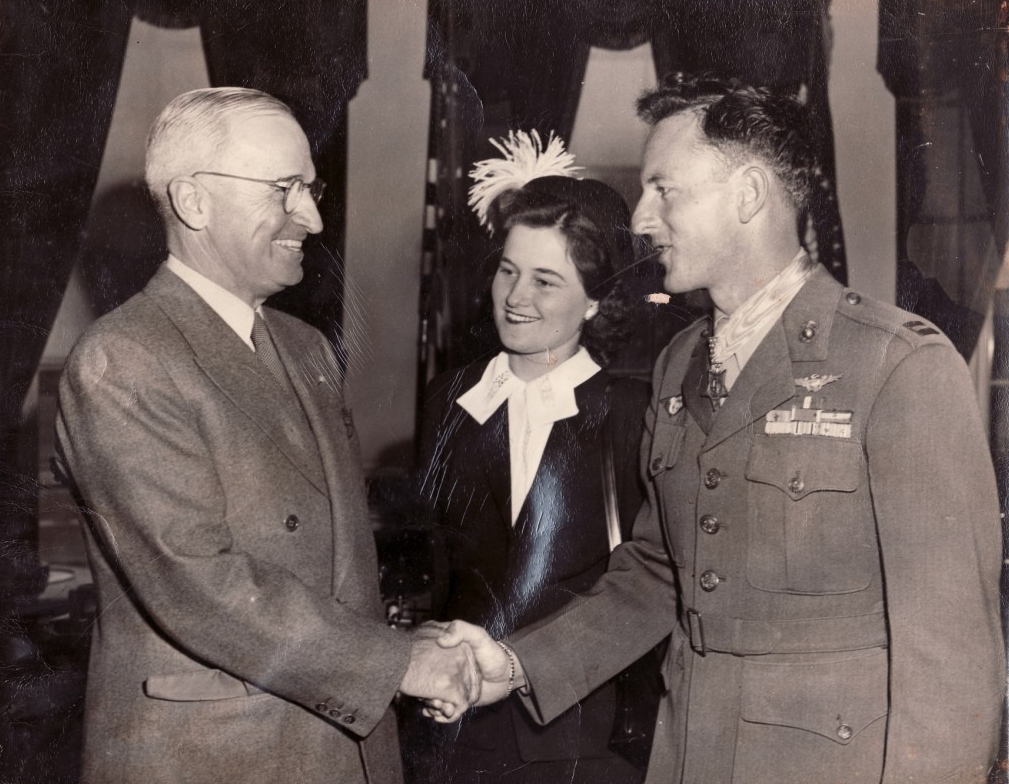
DeBlanc awarded the Medal of Honor by President Harry Truman (1946).

The President of the United States takes pride in presenting the MEDAL OF HONOR to

FIRST LIEUTENANT JEFFERSON J. DEBLANC
UNITED STATES MARINE CORPS RESERVE

for service as set forth in the following CITATION:

For conspicuous gallantry and intrepidity at the risk of his life above and beyond the call of duty as Leader of a Section of Six Fighter Planes in Marine Fighting Squadron ONE HUNDRED TWELVE, during aerial operations against enemy Japanese forces off Kolombangara Island in the Solomons Group, 31 January 1943. Taking off with his section as escort for a strike force of dive bombers and torpedo planes ordered to attack Japanese surface vessels, First Lieutenant DeBlanc led his flight directly to the target area where, at 14,000 feet, our strike force encountered a large number Japanese Zeros protecting the enemy's surface craft. In company with the other fighters, First Lieutenant DeBlanc instantly engaged the hostile planes and aggressively countered their repeated attempts to drive off our bombers, persevering in his efforts to protect the diving planes and waging fierce combat until, picking up a call for assistance from the dive bombers under attack by enemy float planes at 1,000 feet, he broke off his engagement with the Zeros, plunged into the formation of float planes and disrupted the savage attack, enabling our dive bombers and torpedo planes to complete their runs on the Japanese surface disposition and to withdraw without further incident. Although his escort mission was fulfilled upon the safe retirement of the bombers, First Lieutenant DeBlanc courageously remained on the scene despite a rapidly diminishing fuel supply and, boldly challenging the enemy's superior number of float planes, fought a valiant battle against terrific odds, seizing the tactical advantage and striking repeatedly to destroy three of the hostile aircraft and to disperse the remainder. Prepared to maneuver his damaged plane back to base, he had climbed aloft and set his course when he discovered two Zeros closing in behind. Undaunted, he opened fire and blasted both Zeros from the sky in short, bitterly fought action which resulted in such hopeless damage to his plane that he was forced to bail out at a perilously low altitude atop the trees on enemy-held Kolombangara. A gallant officer, a superb airman and an indomitable fighter, First Lieutenant DeBlanc had rendered decisive assistance during a critical stage of operations, and his unwavering fortitude in the face of overwhelming opposition reflects the highest credit upon himself and adds new luster to the traditions of the United States Naval Service.

/S/ HARRY S. TRUMAN

== Post-war career ==
DeBlanc and his wife Louise had four sons and one daughter, and several grand and great-grandchildren.

After returning to the U.S., DeBlanc continued his education—earning a B.S. degree in physics and math from Southwestern Louisiana Institute in 1947; an M.A. Education (physics) from Louisiana State University in 1951 and a second master's degree in Education (mathematics) in 1963; and earning a doctorate (Ed.D) in Education from McNeese State University in 1973.

DeBlanc was discharged from active duty on December 31, 1945. He returned to his home in St. Martinville, Louisiana, and was assigned to the 8th Marine Corps Reserve District, later serving as commander of Marine Air Reserve Group 18. DeBlanc retired from the Marine Corps Reserve as a colonel on July 1, 1972.

In the mid 1970s and 1980s, DeBlanc taught middle and high school Math and Physics at AFCENT International School (currently Allied Joint Force Command Brunssum), Brunssum, The Netherlands.

In 2006, DeBlanc appeared on an episode of the History Channel series Dogfights. In the episode, titled 'Guadalcanal', DeBlanc's "ace in a day" action is depicted. The episode was the fourth episode of the first season of the series, which recreated historical air combat campaigns using modern computer graphics. Also in the episode, DeBlanc humorously declared that on the day he was rescued and traded back to the Navy by natives, he "knew exactly what I was worth that day – one bag of rice!".

On the morning of Thanksgiving Day, November 22, 2007, Jefferson DeBlanc died in Lafayette, Louisiana, age 86, from complications due to pneumonia. He was the last surviving World War II recipient of the Medal of Honor from Louisiana. He was predeceased by his wife Louise who died in 2005.

He is buried with full military honors at Saint Michael's Cemetery, Saint Martinville, St. Martin Parish, Louisiana.

== See also ==
- List of Medal of Honor recipients
- List of Medal of Honor recipients for World War II
- George C. Axtell
- Archie G. Donahue
- Jeremiah J. O'Keefe
- James E. Swett
- John L. Smith
