= Lidiya Ivanova (journalist) =

Russian journalist, writer and announcer

Lidiya Ivanova

Lidiya Mikhailovna Ivanova (née Samsonova, Russian: Лидия Михайловна Иванова; 7 April 1936, Moscow – 7 November 2007, Moscow) was a Russian print and television journalist, television announcer and writer. She died of complications from diabetes on 7 November 2007.

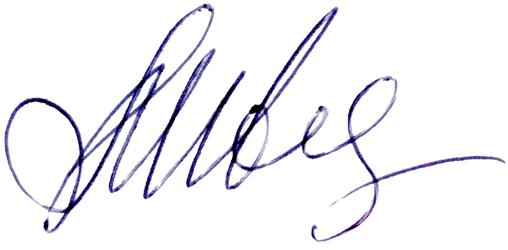
Signature

Master of Sports in rowing, a member of the USSR national team.
