= Richard C. Mangrum =

United States Marine Corps general (1906–1985)

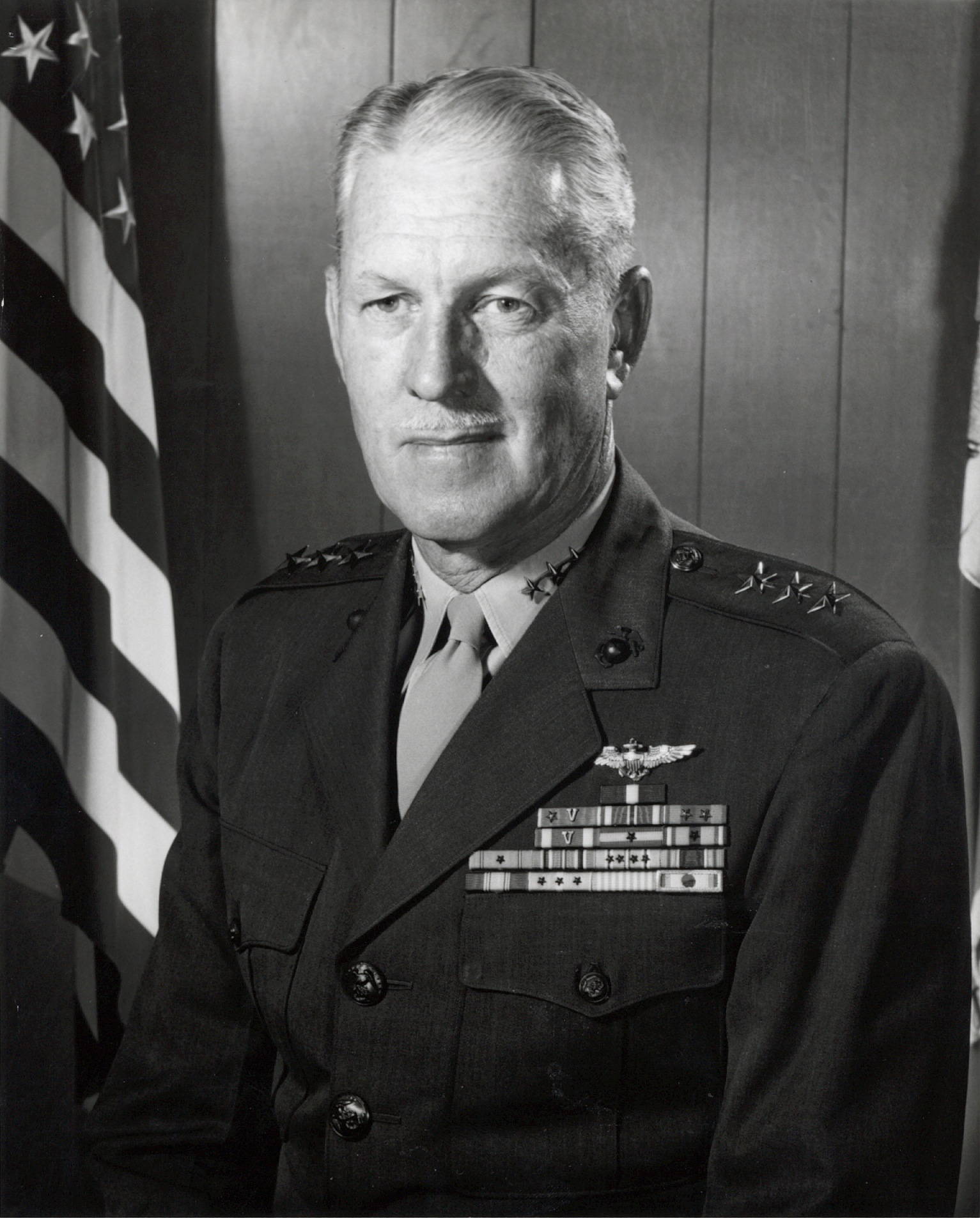
- LtGen Richard C. Mangrum; Assistant Commandant of the Marine Corps (1965–1967)
- Born: October 27, 1906; Seattle, Washington, U.S.
- Died: September 28, 1985 (aged 78); Southern Pines, North Carolina, U.S.
- Burial place: Arlington National Cemetery
- Relatives: Son-in-law: Admiral Jonathan Howe, USN
- Military career
- Allegiance: United States
- Branch: United States Marine Corps
- Service years: 1929–1967
- Rank: Lieutenant general
- Nickname: "Gray Eagle"
- Commands: VMSB-232; MAG-93; MAG-45; MAG-12; MAG-31; 1st MAW; 2nd MAW; Assistant Commandant of the Marine Corps (1965–1967)
- Conflicts: World War II; Guadalcanal Campaign; Korean War
- Awards: Navy Cross; Navy Distinguished Service Medal; Legion of Merit (2); Distinguished Flying Cross

Richard C. Mangrum (October 27, 1906 – September 28, 1985) was a United States Marine Corps lieutenant general who served as Assistant Commandant of the Marine Corps from 1965 to 1967. Mangrum was a Marine Corps aviator who was awarded the Navy Cross and the Distinguished Flying Cross for his actions during the Guadalcanal Campaign in World War II.

On October 1, 1965, Mangrum became the "Gray Eagle" of Naval Aviation, and is the first Marine Aviator to attain this distinction.

== Biography ==
Richard C. Mangrum was born on October 27, 1906, in Seattle, Washington. He graduated from the University of Washington in 1928. Mangrum then enlisted in the United States Marine Corps to become a naval aviator. He completed flight training on August 20, 1929, and was commissioned a second lieutenant shortly thereafter.

On December 7, 1941, Mangrum, then with VMSB-232, was at Pearl Harbor. Twenty of his squadron's SBD Dauntless dive bombers were destroyed on the tarmac at Marine Corps Air Station Ewa. During the early months of the Guadalcanal Campaign in 1942, he commanded VMSB-232, the first scout bomber squadron to join the Cactus Air Force. On August 20, Mangrum's dozen Douglas SBD Dauntless dive bombers launched from the deck of the USS Long Island (CVE-1) escorted by Grumman F4F Wildcats from Maj John Smith's VMF-223 to become the first Marine planes to land on the new airfield that had just been constructed. They were met on the tarmac by Alexander Vandegrift then commanding general of the 1st Marine Division. He was awarded the Navy Cross and Distinguished Flying Cross for successful attacks on Japanese naval units during engagements such as the Battle of the Eastern Solomons. During his first 29 days ashore during the battle, Mangrum flew 28 missions including ten strikes, eight searches and seven reconnaissance patrols in support of both ground and naval forces.

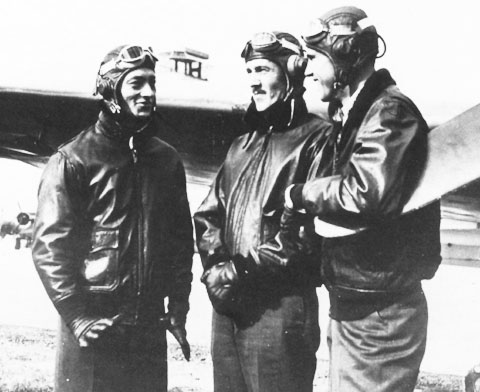
Maj John L. Smith, LtCol Richard C. Mangrum, and Capt Marion E. Carl c. 1942

Mangrum left Guadalcanal on October 14, 1942, as the only pilot from his squadron able to walk away from Henderson Field. Seven had been killed, four were wounded and all of the others had been flown out for hospitalization. Returning to the United States, he served as commanding officer, Cadet Regiment at Naval Air Training Center, Corpus Christi, Texas from 1943 to 1944. He commanded Marine Aircraft Group 93 from May to October 1944, then returned to overseas duty in the Pacific, serving as chief of staff, 3rd Marine Aircraft Wing until January 1945. Mangrum was awarded the Legion of Merit as commanding officer of Marine Aircraft Group 45, based on Ulithi, Western Caroline Islands, until October 1945.

He returned to the United States at the end of World War II, and was assigned duty in Headquarters Marine Corps to re-activate the Marine Corps Reserve aviation organization, serving until July 1948. He was a graduate of the Naval War College Senior Course in 1949, and from 1949 to 1951, served on the faculty in the Strategy and Tactics Department.

Mangrum was awarded a second Legion of Merit with Combat "V" during the Korean War, 1951, for duty as commanding officer, Marine Aircraft Group 12. Later, he was awarded the Navy Commendation Medal with Combat "V" as First Marine Aircraft Wing liaison officer to Headquarters, 5th Air Force in Seoul, Korea, in 1952.

Returning to the United States, Mangrum served as deputy director, Marine Corps Educational Center, Marine Corps Schools, Marine Corps Base Quantico, Virginia, from 1952 to 1954. He commanded Marine Corps Air Station Miami from 1954 to 1955 and Marine Aircraft Group 31 (MAG-31) (Reinforced) from 1955 to 1956. He also commanded the Marine Air-Ground Landing Force in Atlantic Fleet amphibious exercises before going to Washington, D.C., in June 1956.

He was promoted to brigadier general on July 1, 1956, and served as deputy assistant chief of staff, G-3, for strategic plans and Joint Chiefs of Staff matters.

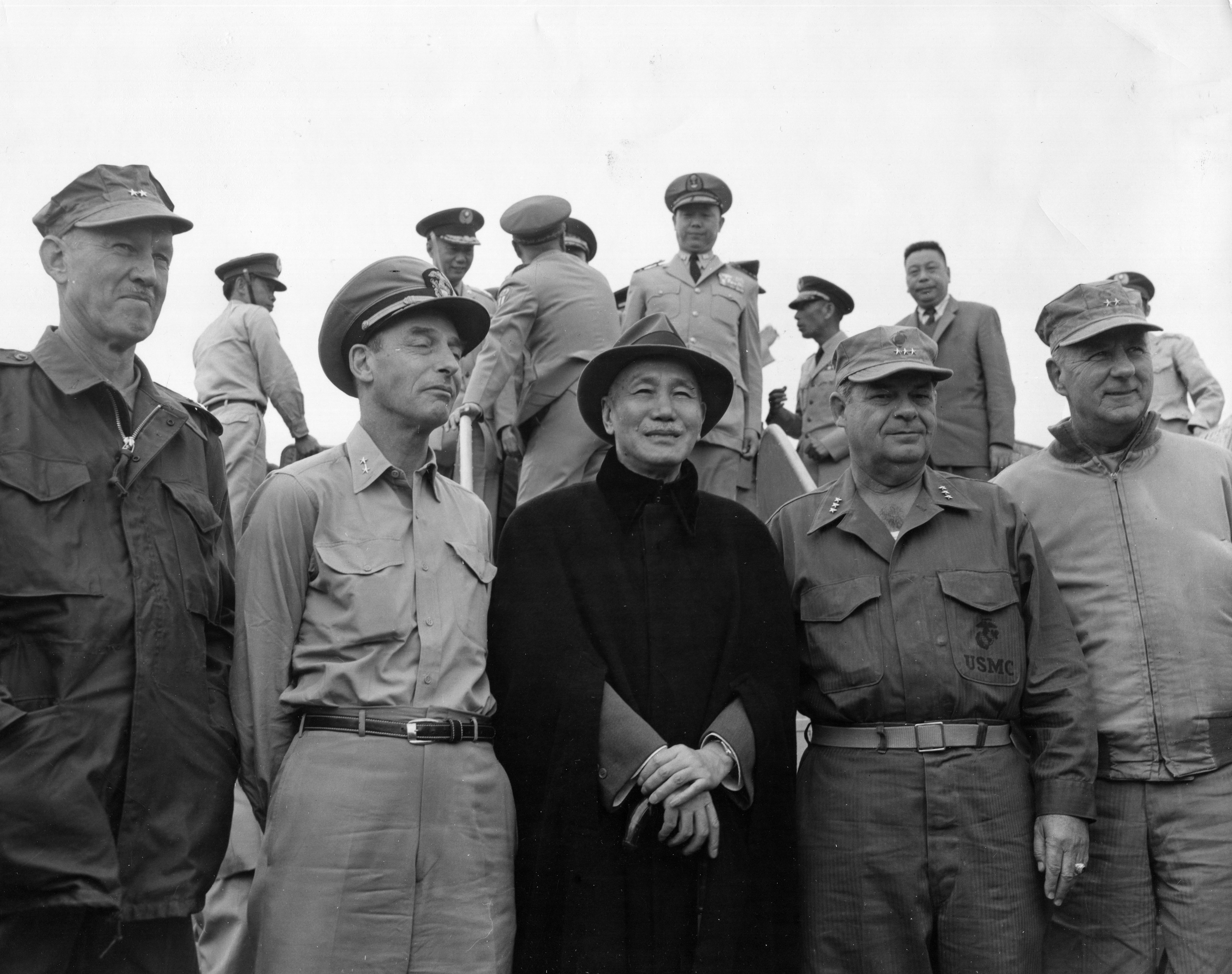
The Visit of Chiang Kai-shek during the fleet exercise on March 27, 1960. From left to right: Mangrum (CG, 1st MAW), RADM Charles O. Triebel (Commander, Amphibious Group ONE), Chiang Kai-shek, Thomas A. Wornham (CG, FMFPac) and MG Robert B. Luckey (CG, 3rd Marine Division).

Mangrum served with the 1st Marine Aircraft Wing in Japan, February 1959, as assistant wing commander. He was promoted to major general on November 1, 1959, and served as the commanding general of the 1st Marine Aircraft Wing until April 1960.

He then served as deputy commander, Fleet Marine Force, Atlantic, 1960–1961, and later commanding general, 2nd Marine Aircraft Wing, October 1961 to August 1963. General Mangrum was named director, Marine Corps Educational Center, Quantico, and served there from 1963 to 1965.

On October 1, 1965, General Mangrum succeeded to the title "Gray Eagle" of Naval Aviation, becoming the first Marine Aviator to attain this distinction. The "Gray Eagle" is the earliest designated aviator on active duty in the Navy and Marine Corps. Mangrum was designated a Naval Aviator in August 1929.

He assumed office as Assistant Commandant of the Marine Corps on July 1, 1965, and was advanced to the rank of lieutenant general. He retired June 30, 1967 after being awarded the Navy Distinguished Service Medal at Marine Barracks, Washington, D.C.

He died on September 28, 1985, in Southern Pines, North Carolina, at the age of 78. He was buried in Arlington National Cemetery on October 4, 1985.

His daughter, Dr. Harriet Mangrum Howe, is married to retired Navy Admiral Jonathan Trumbull Howe.

== Decorations and awards ==
LtGen. Mangrum's awards include:

Naval Aviator Badge
Navy Cross	Navy Distinguished Service Medal	Distinguished Flying Cross	Legion of Merit w/ 2 award stars & valor device
Air Medal w/ 2 award stars	Navy and Marine Corps Commendation Medal w/ valor device	Navy Presidential Unit Citation w/ 1 service star	Selected Marine Corps Reserve Medal w/ 1 service star
American Defense Service Medal w/ 1 clasp	American Campaign Medal	Asiatic-Pacific Campaign Medal w/ 4 service stars	World War II Victory Medal
National Defense Service Medal w/ 1 service star	Korean Service Medal w/ 3 service stars	Korean Presidential Unit Citation	United Nations Korea Medal

=== Navy Cross citation ===
The President of the United States takes pleasure in presenting the Navy Cross to Richard C. Mangrum (0-4412), Lieutenant Colonel, U.S. Marine Corps, for extraordinary heroism and distinguished service in the line of his profession Leader and as a Pilot in Marine Scout-Bombing Squadron Two Hundred Thirty-Two (VMSB-232), Marine Air Group Twenty-Three (MAG-23), First Marine Aircraft Wing, in aerial combat with enemy Japanese forces in the Solomon Islands Area from 20 August 1942 to 15 September 1942. Commanding a Navy and Marine Corps striking force of sixteen planes, Lieutenant Colonel Mangrum intercepted and attacked an enemy task force of surface craft which was planning to attack our beachhead on Guadalcanal. Striking with lightning-like precision, his planes dropped all their bombs before the enemy surface craft could initiate evasive action, making a direct hit on the largest transport, blasting men and debris into the water, and setting the ship on fire. After a cruiser was also hit and left burning, later to disappear, the Japanese were forced to withdraw and abandon their mission. Lieutenant Colonel Mangrum's high quality of leadership and the aggressive spirit of his command in action contributed in large measure to the success achieved by our forces and were in keeping with the highest traditions of the United States Naval Service.

== See also ==
- Commandant of the Marine Corps
