= Robert P. Keller =

United States Marine general (1920–2010)

Robert Prescott Keller
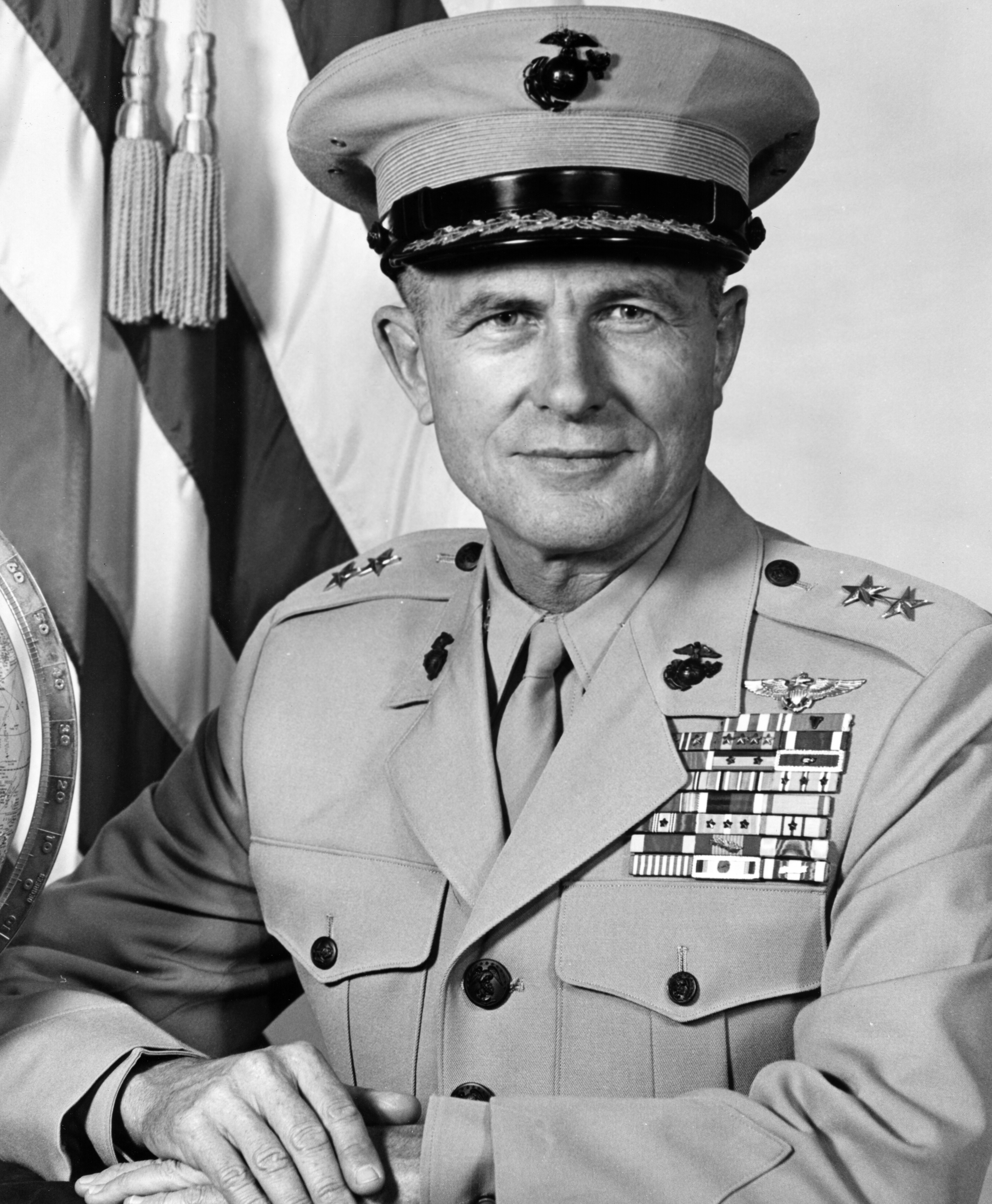
- Keller as Major General
- Born: February 9, 1920; Oakland, California, US
- Died: November 13, 2010 (aged 90); Pensacola, Florida, US
- Burial place: Barrancas National Cemetery
- Military career
- Allegiance: United States of America
- Branch: United States Marine Corps
- Service years: 1940–1974
- Rank: Lieutenant general
- Nickname: "Bob"
- Service number: 0-6855
- Commands: Develop. and Education Command; 4th Marine Aircraft Wing; Marine Aircraft Group 15; Marine Attack Squadron 531; Marine Night Fighter Squadron 533; Marine Attack Squadron 223
- Conflicts: World War II; Solomon Islands campaign; Bougainville campaign; New Britain campaign; Korean War; Battle of Pusan Perimeter; Battle of Inchon; Second Battle of Seoul; Vietnam War; Battle of Khe Sanh
- Awards: Distinguished Service Medal; Silver Star; Legion of Merit (3); Distinguished Flying Cross (3); Air Medal (12); Purple Heart

Robert Prescott Keller (February 9, 1920 – November 13, 2010) was a highly decorated Naval aviator in the United States Marine Corps with the rank of lieutenant general. He began his career as reserve pilot during World War II; he shot down one enemy aircraft and damaged two others during New Britain campaign. Keller distinguished himself again as pilot during Korean War and later reached general's rank during Vietnam War.

He rose to the three-star rank and completed his career as commanding general, Marine Corps Development and Education Command at Quantico, Virginia, in September 1974 after 34 years of service.

== Early career ==
=== World War II ===
Robert P. Keller was born on February 9, 1920, in Oakland, California, the son of Harry and Eulilee Keller. Following high school, he entered the University of California, Berkeley and applied for Naval Aviator Program. Keller was accepted on July 15, 1940, and enlisted the Marine Corps Reserve on the same date. He was promoted to the private first class and ordered for one-month training to Naval Reserve Aviation Base in Oakland.

Keller was ordered to the Naval Air Station Jacksonville, Florida, in December 1940 and reported for full aviation training as a member of the first class of naval aviation cadets there. He received his Naval aviator's wings upon commissioning to second lieutenant on June 3, 1941, and was ordered to Naval Air Station Pensacola, Florida. Keller then served for 19 months as Flight instructor and was promoted consecutively to first lieutenant and captain.

He then embarked for South Pacific and joined the Marine Fighter Squadron 212 as Squadron Ordnance Officer, responsible for planning and maintenance of squadron's guns and bombs. Keller was stationed at the Midway Island and following the promotion to major, he was appointed Squadron Executive officer under Lieutenant colonel Frederick R. Payne Jr.

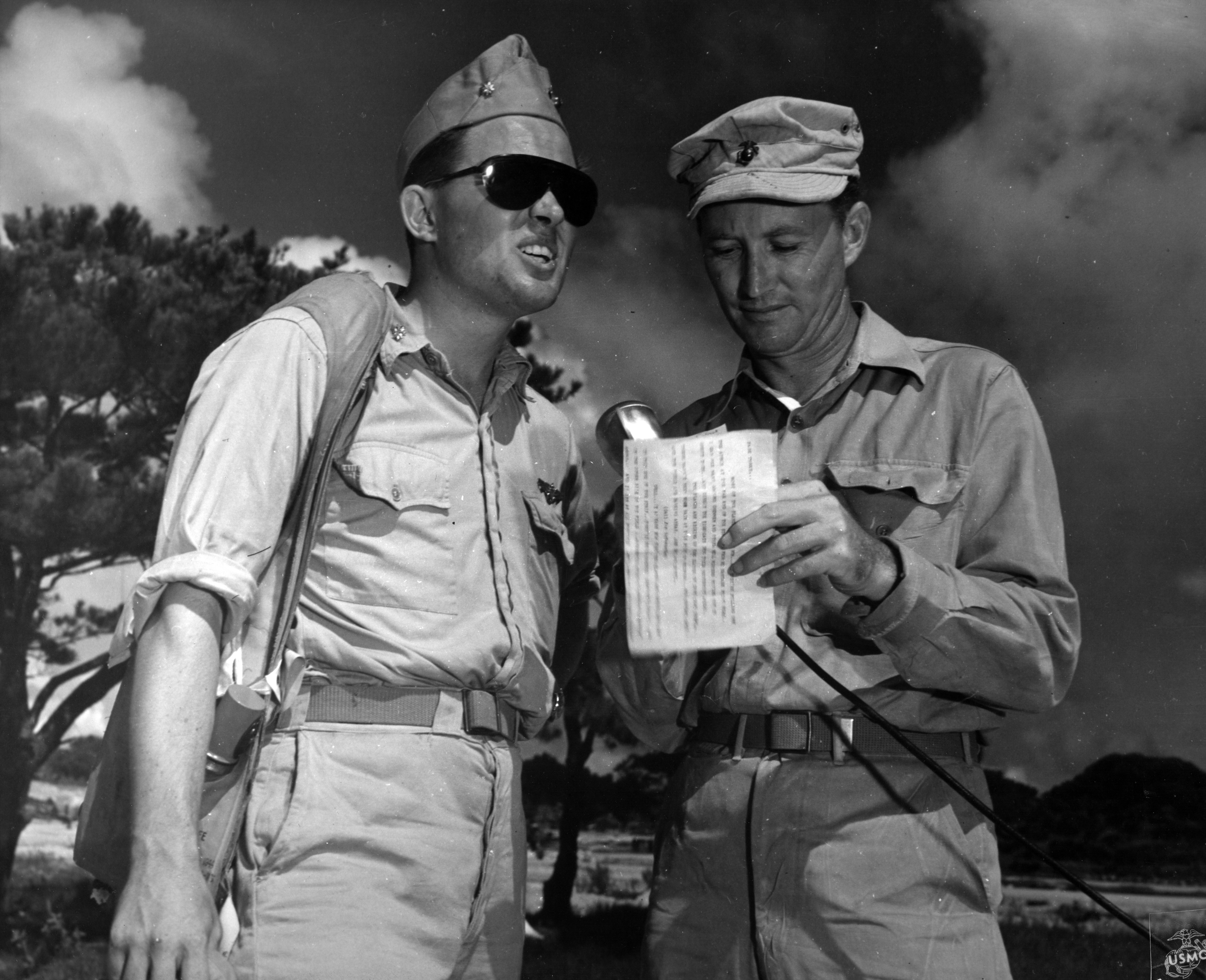
Keller (left) during the interview with a Marine radio-correspondent on Okinawa, June 1945.

Keller remained with the squadron for few months, before he was transferred to Marine Attack Squadron 223 ("Bulldogs") stationed on Hawaii. He was appointed Squadron Executive officer under famous Marine flyer Marion E. Carl and took part in the training and combat air patrols over Hawaii until August 1943, when the whole squadron was transferred to Midway Island. After a brief stay there, squadron moved to Quoin Hill Airfield at New Hebrides from where they escorted allied bombers against ground targets at Green Islands and Bougainville.

During the escort mission with his Vought F4U Corsair near Rabaul, New Britain, Keller destroyed one Japanese airplane and damaged two others and received Distinguished Flying Cross. He succeeded Marion Carl as Squadron commander in February 1944 and was stationed with his squadron at Piva Airfield at Bougainville. During the Japanese artillery shelling of the field on March 8, 1944, three aircraft were destroyed, one enlisted man killed and Keller has been hit with a shrapnel in the hip. He spent four weeks in hospital and was later decorated with the Purple Heart for his wounds. During his tenure as Squadron's commander, Keller hosted prominent aviator and Medal of Honor recipient Charles Lindbergh, who flew three combat missions with his squadron.

He subsequently rejoined his squadron and remained in command until the beginning of July 1944, when he returned to the United States. Keller was ordered for night fighter training, which he completed few months later and transitioned into the Grumman F7F Tigercat. He subsequently assumed command of Marine Fighter Attack Squadron 531 ("Grey Ghosts") and deployed to the Pacific theater again in order to cover the planned Invasion of Japan.

While still at sea, atomic bombs were dropped on Hiroshima and Nagasaki, which forced Japan sign the surrender in September 1945. Keller was transferred to the command of Marine Night Fighter Squadron 533 ("Black Mac's Killers") and embarked for North China in early October 1945. He was stationed near Beiping and his squadron assisted in the repatriation of Japanese forces to their home islands. In addition to his Distinguished Flying Cross and Purple Heart, Keller received ten awards of Air Medal for his bomber escort missions. For his service in North China, he was decorated with Order of the Cloud and Banner.

== Postwar service ==
=== Korea ===
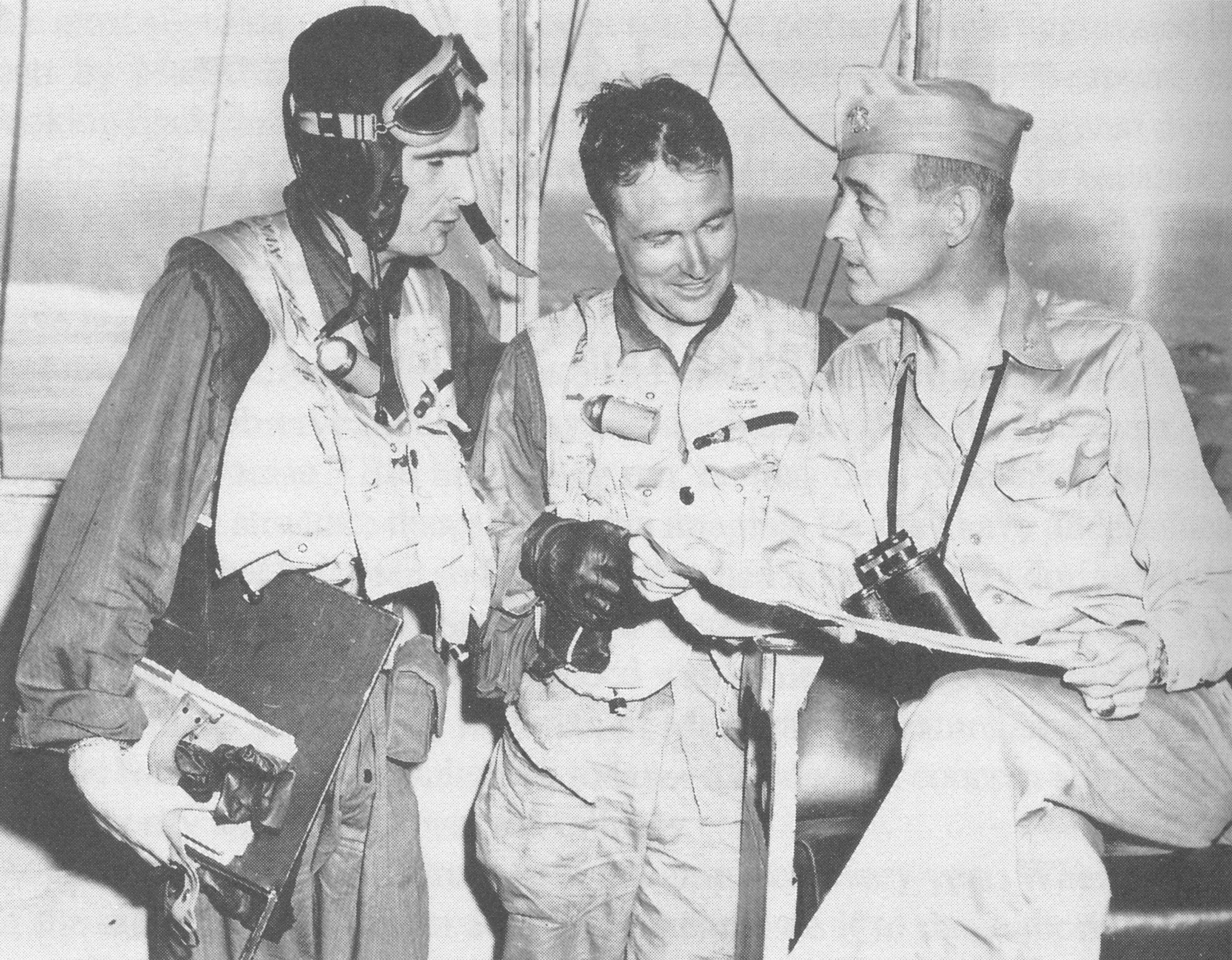
Keller (center) discussing a mission with Captain John Thach (right), commanding officer of aircraft carrier USS Sicily during combat operations against North Korea, August 8, 1950. First lieutenant Roland B. Heilman on the left.

Keller returned to the United States in early 1947 and attended the Amphibious Warfare school at Quantico. He then served as aviation safety officer on the staff of the Chief of Naval Air Training in Pensacola, Florida. In December 1948, Keller entered the Air Command and Staff College at Maxwell Air Force Base, Alabama and graduated in July 1949. He was subsequently sent to the Marine Corps Air Station El Toro, California, where he joined Marine Fighter Squadron 214 ("The Black Sheep") as squadron's executive officer.

During the postwar reduction of the Marine Corps, his squadron had only 24 Vought F4U Corsairs, but plenty of aviation fuel, so Keller was able to spend a lot of time on tactical maneuvers. In June 1950, he led his squadron on a summer training cruise involving Navy Reserve Officer Training Corps midshipmen to Honolulu, Hawaii. Keller and his squadron participated in the intensive training and also trained Naval Reserve Officer Training Corps midshipmen, when he received orders to report to the commanding general, Fleet Marine Force, Pacific, General Lemuel C. Shepherd.

General Shepherd attached Keller and his squadron to the newly formed 1st Provisional Marine Brigade under Brigadier general Edward A. Craig at San Diego. They embarked for South Korea in the middle of July 1950 and Keller's squadron established its headquarters at Itami Air Base, Japan, where it was equipped with bombs and rockets. He then commanded Black Sheep Squadron during the Battle of Pusan Perimeter, where his aircraft attacked enemy equipment, personnel and railroad cars near Chinju and Sinban-ni. It was the first Marine air attack in the Korean War.

He and his wingman then landed at Taegu, where the Joint Army-Navy Tactical Control Air Center was located, only 10 miles from enemy frontlines and after exchanging information and receiving a briefing on the situation, Keller returned with his wingman to escort carrier USS Sicily. When Marine air and ground units were reinforced in August 1950, Black Sheep Squadron got new commanding officer, lieutenant colonel Walter E. Lischeid and Major Keller was appointed his executive officer.

During September 1950, Keller participated in the landing at Inchon and Recapture of Seoul, when his aircraft successfully supported ground units advance and received his second and third Distinguished Flying Crosses. His commander, Lieutenant Colonel Lischeid, was killed by enemy anti-aircraft fire on September 25, 1950, and Keller assumed the command of Black Sheep squadron again.

On November 11, 1950, Keller distinguished himself again, when on the mission of locating and attacking well-concealed enemy mortar and machine gun positions impeding the advancement of friendly forces in the vicinity of Yuha-ri and Ungi-gang. He boldly piloted his aircraft at brush-top level in an attempt to draw the anti-aircraft fire and reveal their positions. After repeated efforts, he observed flashes of hostile guns directed against him and, immediately carrying out a series of attacks, personally scored direct hits with rockets and machine gun fire. Directing his strike group in a coordinated attack which covered the targets in a barrage of rockets, napalm and machine gun fire, he contributed materially to the success of friendly ground forces in advancing on their objective. For this act of valor, he was decorated with the Silver Star.

Keller remained with the Black Sheep Squadron until November 18 that year, when he was appointed 1st Marine Aircraft Wing liaison officer to the Fifth Air Force-Eighth United States Army Joint Operations Center in Seoul. Major General Earle E. Partridge, commanding general of Fifth Air Force and Major General Field Harris, commanding general of 1st Marine Aircraft Wing, reached agreement that marines could direct their own aircraft to targets, while keeping Fifth Air Force informed. This arrangement was in response to the fact, that communications across the Korean peninsula between the two headquarters were relatively unreliable. Keller's primary duties were to advise about Marine air capabilities and actions. However, he remained in that capacity just until mid-December 1950, when he received orders for return to the United States.

=== Post Korea ===
Following his return, Keller was appointed close air support officer and helicopter operations officer at the newly established Tactics and Techniques Board in the Marine Corps Development Center, Quantico, Virginia. While in this capacity, he participated in the development of helicopter doctrine and was promoted to lieutenant colonel in January 1951. Keller remained in that assignment until June 1952, when he was transferred to Camp Lejeune, North Carolina, for duty again as close air support officer and helicopter operations officer for Joint Landing Force Board. He was later ordered to Washington, D.C., for duty as head, operational planning section, Plans and Readiness Branch at the Division of Aviation under Major general William O. Brice.

Upon his detachment from Headquarters Marine Corps in January 1956, he was ordered to the Armed Forces Staff College at Norfolk, Virginia, where he completed the instruction in June that year and assumed duty as maneuver and exercise officer of the staff of the commander-in-chief, Allied Naval Forces Southern Europe with headquarters in Naples, Italy. Keller served under Admiral Robert P. Briscoe until August 1958, when he was ordered back to the United States.

Following his return stateside, Keller was ordered to the Naval Air Station Pensacola for helicopter training, which he completed in November that year and assumed duty as executive officer of Marine Aircraft Group 16 at Marine Corps Air Station Tustin, California. He later moved with Group to Japan and was promoted to colonel in October 1959. He was subsequently transferred to Marine Corps Air Station Iwakuni, where he joined the headquarters of 1st Marine Aircraft Wing and served as Assistant Chief of Staff for Operations (G-3) under Major general Richard C. Mangrum until February 1960.

Keller then returned to the United States and assumed duty as an instructor at the Armed Forces Staff College at Norfolk, Virginia. He taught members of all branch of service until June 1963, when he was ordered to the Marine Corps Air Station El Toro, California for duty as Assistant Chief of Staff for Plans and Programs (G-5) on the staff of Aircraft, Fleet Marine Force, Pacific.

In June 1964, he was ordered to Marine Corps Air Station Edenton, North Carolina and joined the headquarters of 3rd Marine Aircraft Wing under Major General Frederick E. Leek. Keller remained in that capacity for one month and then was appointed commanding officer of Wing's Marine Aircraft Group 15.

== Vietnam War ==
Keller was transferred to the Headquarters Marine Corps in Washington, D.C., in June 1965 and was assigned to the Office of the Deputy Chief of Staff (Plans and Programs), where he assumed duty as Head, Joint and Special Plans Team. He later served in that office as director of Joint Planning Group and was promoted to brigadier general on August 4, 1966. Keller was ordered to South Vietnam at the end of March 1967 and assumed duty as Assistant Wing Commander, 1st Marine Aircraft Wing with headquarters in Da Nang. For his previous service with Joint Planning Group, he was decorated with the Navy Commendation Medal.

While in this capacity, he served as Deputy consecutively to Major generals Louis B. Robertshaw and Norman J. Anderson and was co-responsible for the several hundred of transport, observation and fighter airplanes and helicopters of the Wing. Keller also took part in several observation flights in helicopter including one with his son, Bob Jr., who served as helicopter pilot.

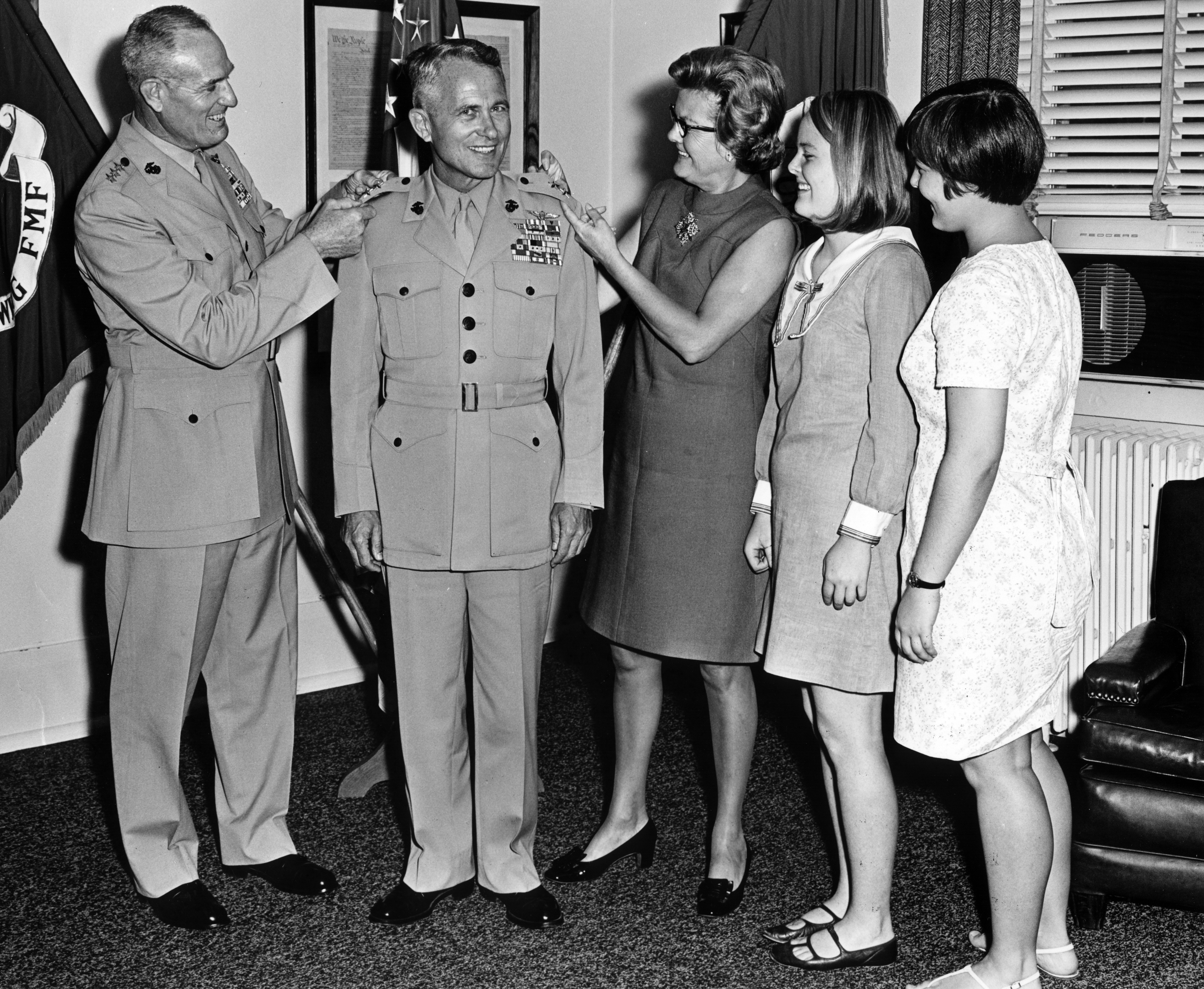
Keller gets his new two-star rank insignia pinned on by Lieutenant general Louis Robertshaw and Mrs. Lucille Keller during a ceremony on August 4, 1969, at the Naval Air Station Glenview, Illinois. Keller's daughters looks on.

His tour of duty in Vietnam ended at the end of April 1968 and Keller received the Legion of Merit with Combat "V" and also was decorated with National Order of Vietnam and Gallantry Cross with Palm by the Government of South Vietnam.

=== Post Vietnam ===
Following his return stateside and brief leave with family, Keller was ordered to Naval Air Station Glenview, Illinois, where he relieved Major general Arthur H. Adams as Commanding general, Marine Air Reserve Training Command with additional duty as Commanding general, 4th Marine Aircraft Wing. While in this capacity, Keller was responsible for the training of reserve marine aviation units and replacements for units deployed in South Vietnam and elsewhere in the World. He was promoted to Major general on August 4, 1969, and remained at Glenview until March 1971. For his service with 4th Marine Aircraft Wing, Keller was decorated with his second Legion of Merit.

He was subsequently ordered to the headquarters, United States Pacific Command on Hawaii, where he assumed duty as Assistant Chief of Staff for Operations (J-3) under Admiral John S. McCain Jr. Keller remained in that capacity until June 1972, when he was ordered back to the continental States for new assignment. He received his third Legion of Merit for service with Pacific Command and was promoted to lieutenant general on July 1, 1972.

Keller subsequently assumed his final assignment as commanding general, Marine Corps Development and Education Command at Quantico, Virginia. While in this capacity, he was responsible for the training and education at The Basic School, Officer Candidates School, Amphibious Warfare School and other facilities there. He also simultaneously commanded the Quantico Base until his retirement.

General Keller retired from active duty on September 1, 1974, after 34 years of commissioned service and received the Navy Distinguished Service Medal by Commandant Robert E. Cushman Jr. during the retirement ceremony. A parade was held in his honor.

== Retirement ==
Upon his retirement from the Marine Corps, Keller settled in Pensacola, Florida, a hometown of his wife Lucille. He cooperated with National Museum of Naval Aviation in Pensacola and served on the board of trustees for 14 years. Keller was also active in several organizations including Retired Officers Association; Golden Eagles; Association of Naval Aviation; China Marines and Marine Corps Historical Foundation.

As a result of civilian schooling in later years, he received Bachelor of Science degree from the University of Maryland, and Master of Arts degree from George Washington University. In 2003, Keller published his memoirs in book "Three Wars.....One Marine".

Lieutenant general Robert P. Keller died on November 13, 2010, aged 90, at his home in Pensacola, Florida. He was buried beside his wife, former Lucille Noris (1920–2003) at Barrancas National Cemetery. They had two sons: Robert Jr. (lieutenant colonel, USMC ret.) and Ronald R. (captain, USMC ret.); and two daughters: Anne Elaine and Joan Elizabeth.

== Decorations ==
Here is the ribbon bar of Lieutenant General Robert P. Keller:

Naval Aviator Badge
1st Row	Navy Distinguished Service Medal			
2nd Row	Silver Star	Legion of Merit with Combat "V" and two 5/16" Gold Stars	Distinguished Flying Cross with two 5/16" Gold Stars	Air Medal with two silver and two 5/16" Gold Stars
3rd Row	Navy Commendation Medal	Purple Heart	Navy Presidential Unit Citation with two stars	Army Presidential Unit Citation with one Oak leaf cluster
4th Row	American Defense Service Medal	American Campaign Medal	Asiatic-Pacific Campaign Medal with three 3/16 inch silver service stars	World War II Victory Medal
5th Row	Navy Occupation Service Medal	China Service Medal	National Defense Service Medal with one star	Korean Service Medal with three 3/16 inch silver service stars
6th Row	Vietnam Service Medal with four 3/16 inch silver service stars	National Order of Vietnam, Knight	Vietnam Gallantry Cross with Palm	Chinese Order of the Cloud and Banner, 4th Class
7th Row	United Nations Korea Medal	Korean Presidential Unit Citation	Vietnam Gallantry Cross unit citation	Vietnam Campaign Medal

== See also ==
- 4th Marine Aircraft Wing

Military offices
Preceded by William G. Thrash	Commanding General, Marine Corps Development and Education Command; July 1, 1972 - September 1, 1974	Succeeded by Edward S. Fris
