= Zenneth A. Pond =

American flying ace

Zenneth Arthur Pond
- Born: December 7, 1919; Jackson, Michigan
- Died: September 10, 1942 (aged 22); Guadalcanal
- Military career
- Allegiance: United States of America
- Branch: United States Marine Corps
- Service years: 1941–1942
- Rank: Second Lieutenant; Captain (posthumously)
- Unit: VMF-223
- Conflicts: World War II: Guadalcanal campaign †
- Awards: Navy Cross; Purple Heart (2)

Zenneth Arthur Pond (December 7, 1919 – September 10, 1942) was a United States Marine Corps flying ace. He was the first Marine ace to be killed in action during World War II and was a posthumous recipient of the Navy Cross.

== Early life and aviation career ==
Zenneth A. Pond was born on December 7, 1919, in Jackson, Michigan. Graduating from Jackson High School in 1938, he subsequently attended Jackson Junior College. While in college, he studied aviation through the Civil Aeronautics Administration. Pond earned his private pilot's license in 1940.

Pond enlisted into the Marine Corps in June 1941 and was sent to flight training at Naval Air Station Corpus Christi, Texas. On February 19, 1942, Pond was officially designated a Marine Corps aviator and was ordered to report to the 2nd Marine Aircraft Wing in San Diego, California.

== Cactus Air Force ace ==
Second Lieutenant Pond was attached to the newly formed Marine Fighting Squadron 223 (VMF-223). On August 2, 1942, Pond's squadron set sail for Guadalcanal aboard the USS Long Island. On August 20, Pond and the rest of his squadron launched from the flight deck of the ship and flew 200 miles to Guadalcanal. Landing in Henderson Field, Pond and his squadron officially became part of the Cactus Air Force.

On August 24, Second Lieutenant Pond scrambled to his plane and took off from the field as the air raid siren sounded. Pond and other Marine pilots intercepted 27 Japanese aircraft attempting to bomb Henderson Field. More than half of the Japanese planes were shot down, with Pond himself scoring victories against two bombers and one fighter.

On August 29, Pond scored his fourth kill, a Zero, but was forced to make an emergency landing when a bullet struck his engine. The next day, Pond claimed his fifth kill and became an ace.

Second Lieutenant Pond was nearly killed a second time on September 5. While shooting down his sixth plane, his aircraft was badly shot up by the Japanese tail gunner, with one bullet grazing Pond's arm. While Pond was returning to Henderson Field, his engine stopped running, yet he was still able to make a deadstick landing.

== Death ==
Second Lieutenant Pond and three other Marine pilots responded to a Japanese air raid on September 10, 1942. The four pilots, including Major John L. Smith, encountered 46 Japanese aircraft. Pond was shot down and killed, making him the first Marine ace to be killed in action during World War II. He was listed as missing in action and declared dead the next day.

Pond's body was never recovered. For his actions during the Guadalcanal campaign, Pond was posthumously promoted to captain and awarded the Navy Cross.

== Awards and decorations ==
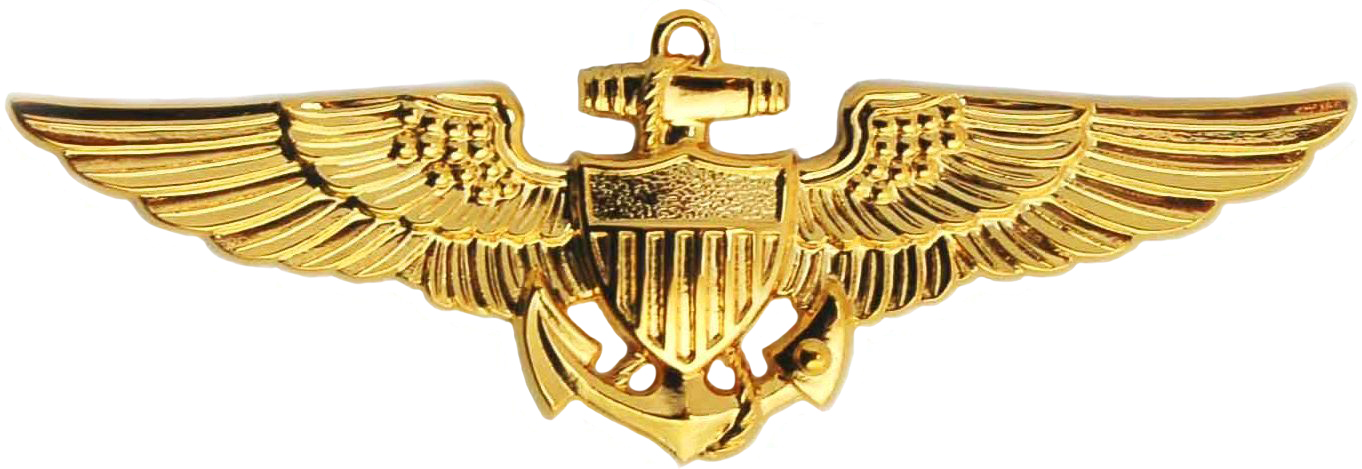

Naval Aviator Badge
Navy Cross
Purple Heart w/ 5/16" gold star	Navy Presidential Unit Citation	American Defense Service Medal
American Campaign Medal	Asiatic–Pacific Campaign Medal w/ 3/16" bronze star	World War II Victory Medal

=== Navy Cross citation ===

Second Lieutenant Zenneth Arthur Pond
U.S. Marine Corps

The President of the United States of America takes pride in presenting the Navy Cross (Posthumously) to Second Lieutenant Zenneth Arthur Pond, United States Marine Corps Reserve, for extraordinary heroism and distinguished service in the line of his profession while serving as a Pilot in Marine Fighting Squadron TWO HUNDRED TWENTY-THREE (VMF-223), Marine Air Group TWENTY-THREE (MAG-23), FIRST Marine Aircraft Wing, in aerial combat with enemy Japanese forces in the Solomon Islands from 20 August 1942 to 13 September 1942. Alone, and with utter disregard for his own personal safety, Second Lieutenant Pond courageously attacked and shot down six enemy planes. His outstanding valor and skillful airmanship were in keeping with the highest traditions of the United States Naval Service.
