= Cub-1 =

U.S. military campaign in World War II

Cub-1 was a code name for a medium-sized military division of an Advance Base Aviation Training Unit.

The United States Navy established the ABATU at the onset of World War II to support expeditionary airfield operations in the Pacific Area of Operations. Guadalcanal was the first operation that used an ABATU. Marine Corps aircraft from Marine Aircraft Group 23 arrived on Henderson Field on August 20, 1942. The aircraft flew in from aircraft carriers without their maintenance personnel. Although not trained on aircraft, mechanics from CUB-1 kept the Marine planes flying until Marine aircraft mechanics were sent ashore. Large sized units were code-named Lion and medium-sized units were code-named Cub.

== See also ==
- US Naval Base Solomon Islands
- US Naval Advance Bases
- Seabee
