= Marion Eugene Carl =

United States Marine Corps general

Marion E. Carl
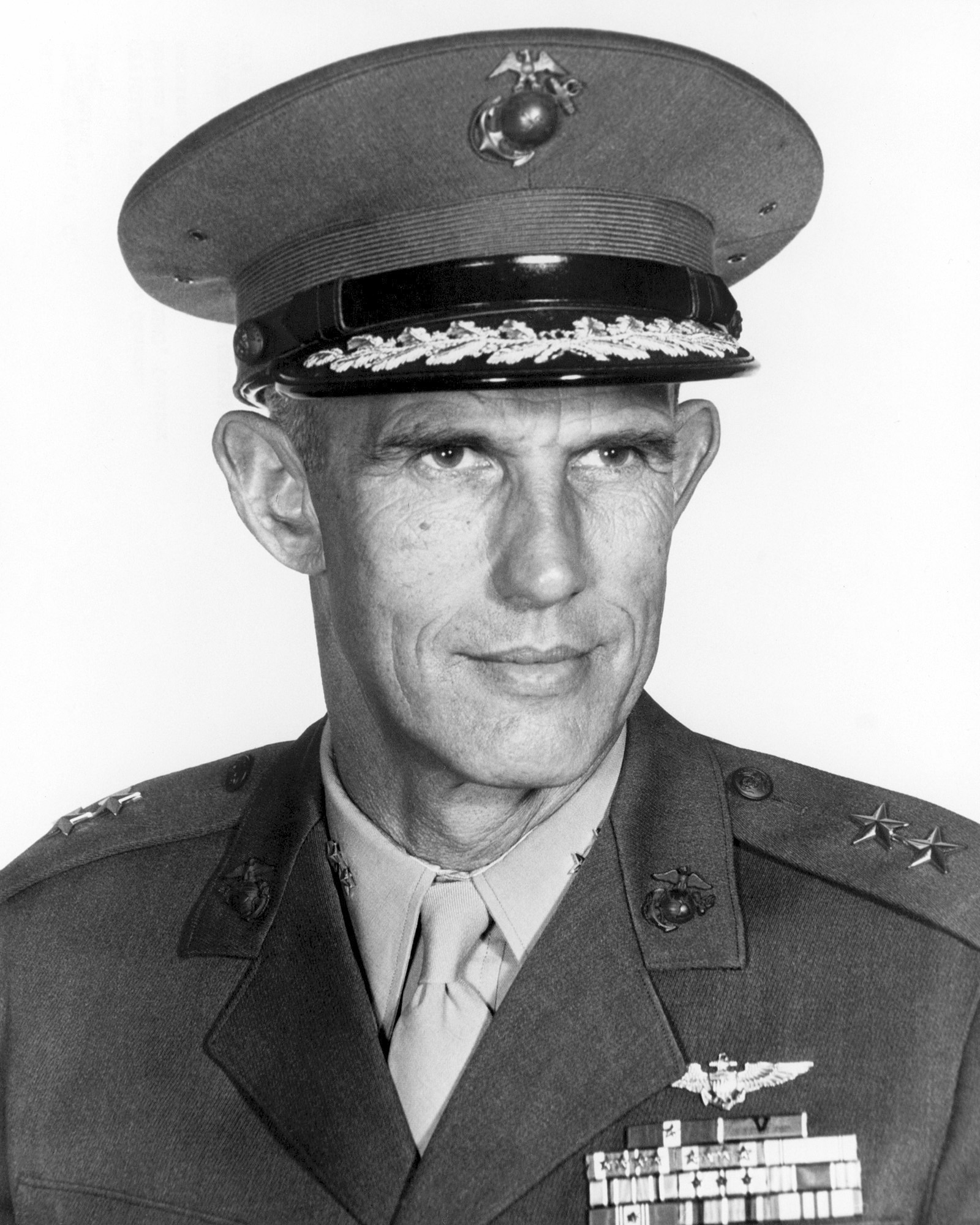
- Major General Marion E. Carl in August 1967
- Born: November 1, 1915; Hubbard, Oregon, U.S.
- Died: June 28, 1998 (aged 82); Roseburg, Oregon, U.S.
- Burial place: Arlington National Cemetery
- Spouse: Edna Kirvin (m. 1943)
- Children: 2
- Military career
- Allegiance: United States of America
- Branch: United States Army Reserve; United States Marine Corps
- Service years: 1938–1973
- Rank: Major General
- Commands: VMF-223; VMF-122; Director of Marine Corps Aviation; 2nd Marine Aircraft Wing; Inspector General of the Marine Corps
- Conflicts: World War II: Battle of Midway; Battle of Guadalcanal; Vietnam War
- Awards: Navy Cross (2); Legion of Merit (4); Distinguished Flying Cross (5); Air Medal (14)

Major General Marion Eugene Carl (November 1, 1915 – June 28, 1998) was an American military officer, World War II fighter ace, record-setting test pilot, and naval aviator. He was the United States Marine Corps' first ace in World War II.

== Early years ==
Born on the family dairy farm near Hubbard, Oregon, Carl was always attracted to aviation. He learned to fly while attending college and soloed after only 2½ hours of instruction; eight to ten hours is typical. He studied aeronautical engineering at Oregon State College (now a university) and, in 1938, graduated with a Bachelor of Science degree as a lieutenant in the Army Reserve.

== Marine Corps career ==
Carl resigned his Army commission to become a naval aviation cadet and received his "Wings of Gold" and Marine Corps commission in December 1939. His first posting was to Marine Fighting Squadron One (VMF-1) at Quantico, Virginia. After a year there, he was posted back to Pensacola as an instructor pilot helping to train the rapidly growing number of naval aviators, before receiving orders to the newly formed Marine Fighting Squadron 221 (VMF-221) at NAS North Island in San Diego, California.

=== World War II ===
The 7 December 1941 attack on Pearl Harbor found VMF-221 preparing to embark aboard the aircraft carrier USS Saratoga for transport to Marine Corps Air Station Ewa on the island of Oahu, Hawaii. The unit was rushed to Hawaii, then to Wake Island as part of the WI Relief Task Force, still aboard Saratoga. After the relief attempt was cancelled, VMF-221 was deployed to Midway Atoll on Christmas Day, 1941. Carl's first combat occurred six months later during the Battle of Midway on June 4, 1942, when 15 of the 25 aircraft VMF-221 put into the air that morning were destroyed. Nevertheless, Carl was credited with destroying one enemy aircraft, a Mitsubishi Zero. All the survivors of VMF-221 were returned to Hawaii shortly after the battle.

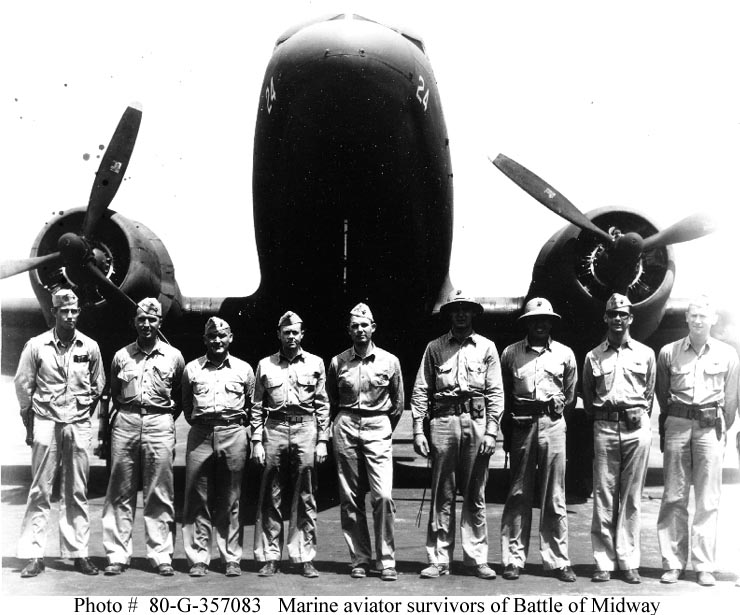
Survivors of the Battle of Midway at Ewa Mooring Mast Field, Oahu on 22 June 1942. From left to right: Capt Marion E. Carl, Capt Kirk Armistead, Maj Raymond Scollin (of Marine Air Group 22), Capt Herbert T. Merrill, 2nd Lt Charles M. Kunz, 2nd Lt Charles S. Hughes, 2nd Lt Hyde Phillips, Capt Philip R. White, and 2nd Lt Roy A. Corry Jr.

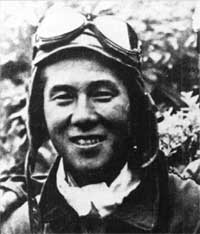
Junichi Sasai wearing flight gear. This 1942 photo shows Sasai shortly before his death over Guadalcanal on August 26.

After a short rest, Carl was reassigned to Marine Fighting Squadron 223 (VMF-223), led by former VMF-221 pilot Captain (later Major) John L. Smith. On August 20, VMF-223 was deployed to Guadalcanal, the first fighter unit ashore with the Cactus Air Force. Over the next two months, Carl became the Marines' first ace, running his tally to 16.5 victories, during which time he had to bail out once from a badly damaged airplane. It is believed that on August 26 Carl shot down the famous Japanese Navy Tainan Kōkūtai ace Junichi Sasai over Henderson Field. When the squadron left Guadalcanal in October, Carl was America's second-ranking ace behind Major Smith.

In 1943, then-Major Carl returned to the Pacific and led VMF-223 until the following summer. During combat in the Solomon Islands, he claimed two more enemy planes, finishing as the Corps' seventh-ranking ace with 18.5 victories.

==== Aerial victory credits ====
Date	Total	Aircraft types claimed (location)
04 Jun 1942	1	1 A6M Zeke destroyed and 2 damaged (Midway VMF-221)
24 Aug 1942	4	1 A6M Zeke, 1 Betty bomber, 2 Kate bombers destroyed (Cactus)
26 Aug 1942	2	2 A6M Zekes destroyed (Cactus)
29 Aug 1942	1	1 Betty bomber destroyed (Cactus)
30 Aug 1942	3	3 A6M Zekes destroyed (Cactus)
09 Sep 1942	2	2 Mitsubishi G4M Betty bombers destroyed (Cactus)
27 Sep 1942	1½	1.5 (1 shared credit with Major. K. Armistead) Betty bombers destroyed (Cactus)
28 Sep 1942	1	1 Betty bomber destroyed (Cactus)
03 Oct 1942	1	1 A6M Zero destroyed (Cactus)
23 Dec 1943	1	1 Ki-61 Tony destroyed (Rabaul)
27 Dec 1943	1	1 A6M Zeke destroyed (Rabaul)
	18½	

=== Test pilot ===
In 1945, Carl graduated in the first test pilot class at Naval Air Station Patuxent River, Maryland. As a lieutenant colonel, he conducted pioneering jet operations from aircraft carriers and later commanded VMF-122, the first Marine jet squadron.

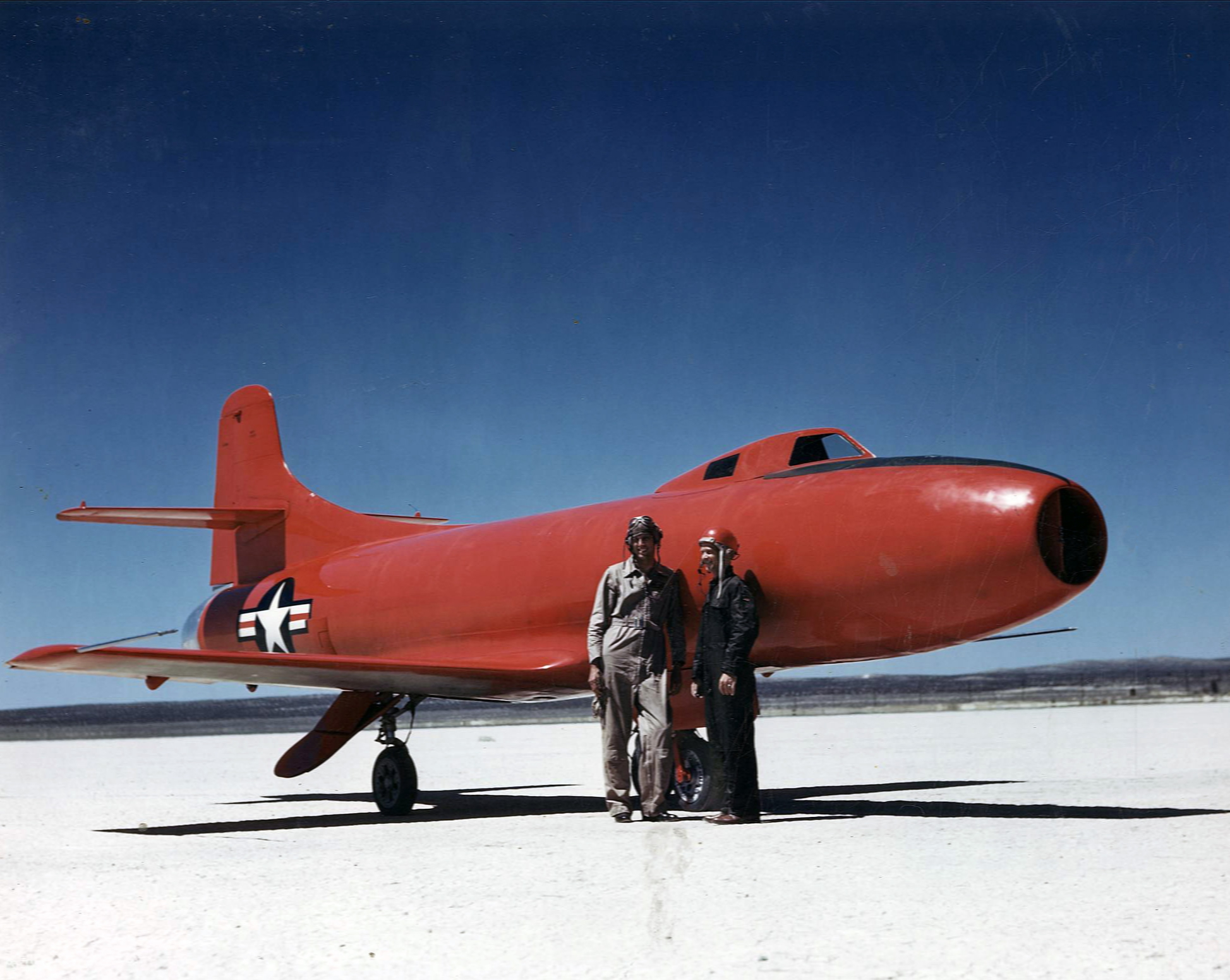
Carl and Commander Caldwell with a D-558-1 at Muroc (1947)

In 1947, Carl was one of two pilots selected to fly the Douglas D-558/I Skystreak in record-setting speed attempts. That August, he was recorded at 650 miles per hour (1,050 km/h), establishing a new world record for a conventional aircraft. When Air Force Captain Chuck Yeager broke the sound barrier in October, he also broke Carl's record.

At Patuxent River on April 1, 1952, Carl had a close brush with death. He was performing a series of check spins in the new Grumman AF-2S Guardian anti-submarine attack aircraft. The anti-spin parachute that had been fitted in earlier tests had been removed. Climbing to 10,000 feet (3,000 m) over Chesapeake Bay, Carl commenced the spin. The aircraft entered a flat spin with strong centrifugal forces. Carl could not break the spin and rode it down to 4,000 ft (1,200 m). He tried to operate the ejection seat, but the face blind ripped away in his hands and the seat failed to fire. He climbed out at 3,000 feet (910 m). He then tried the wind-tunnel approved method of getting out on the inside of the spin, but was forced back due to airflow. He finally got out on the other side and felt his parachute open as he fell into the splash of the aircraft. The success of this proved bailing out on the inside of the spin to avoid being hit by the tail was an incorrect theory.

During a second test pilot tour in 1953, Carl set an unofficial altitude record of 83,000 feet (25,000 m) in the Douglas D-558/II.

Between test pilot duties, Carl commanded other units including a reconnaissance squadron based on Taiwan. In 1954, he led missions over Mainland China, photographing Communist forces along the coast. After his death, an incorrect version of his reconnaissance missions appeared in several obituaries, stating that he had flown U-2 spy planes.

=== Vietnam War ===
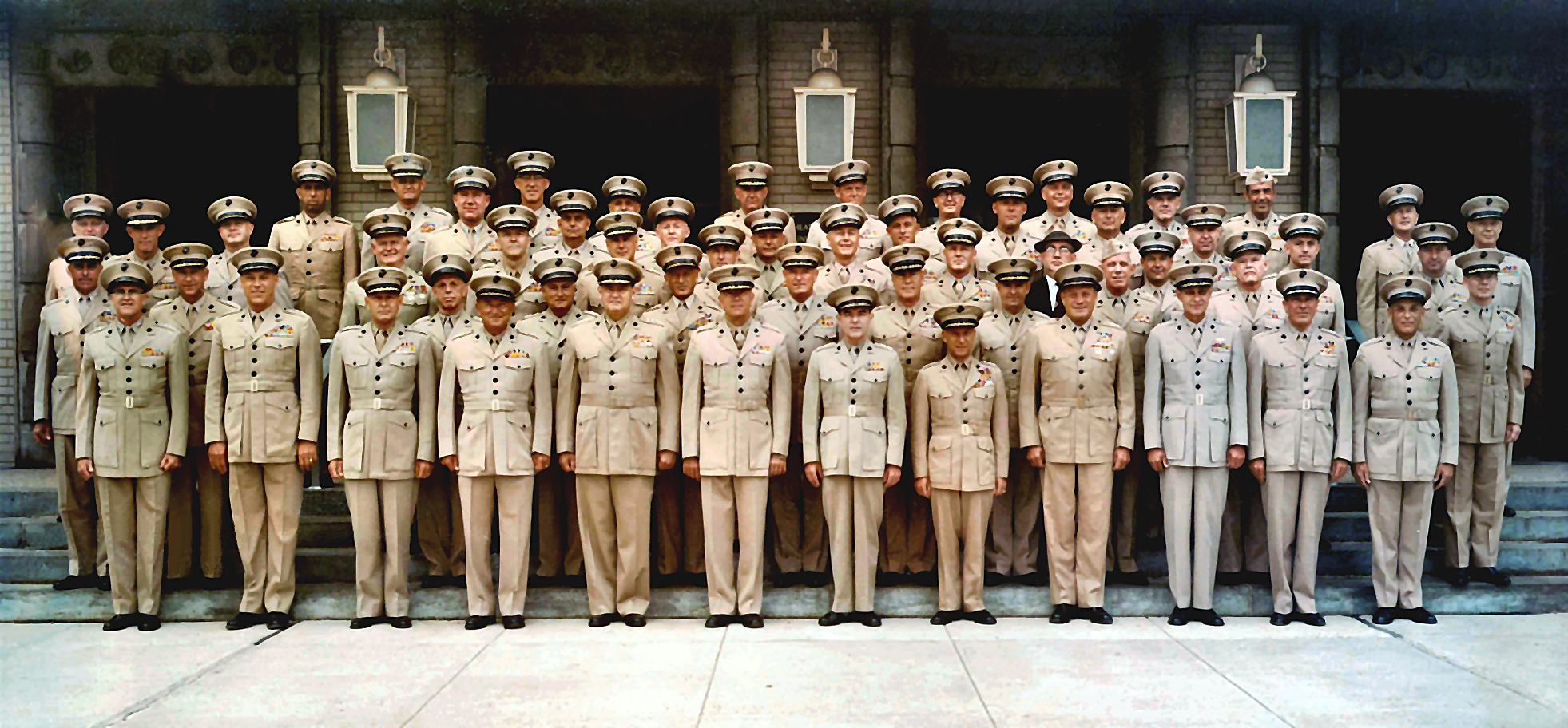
Carl (1st from left, middle row) at the 1967 General Officers Symposium

Though still a colonel, Carl became Director of Marine Corps Aviation for five months in 1962. In 1964 he was promoted to brigadier general; in 1965, he took the 1st Marine Brigade to Danang, South Vietnam. Despite his seniority, he repeatedly flew combat missions in helicopter gunships and jet fighters.

Carl received his second star as a major general in 1967, commanding the 2nd Marine Aircraft Wing at MCAS Cherry Point, North Carolina, from 1968 to 1970. He subsequently served as Inspector General of the Marine Corps, until retiring in 1973. By then he had logged some 13,000 flying hours, more than twice as much as most contemporaries.

== Murder ==
Jesse Fanus

Carl returned to his native Oregon, where he and his wife Edna settled near Roseburg. Marion Carl's memoir, Pushing the Envelope, coauthored with his friend Barrett Tillman, was published in 1994. In 1998, at age 82, he was shot to death during a robbery, defending Edna from a home invader. Carl had entered his living room late one evening and had found an intruder pointing a shotgun at his wife and demanding money and car-keys. Carl lunged at the intruder who fired his weapon, the shot grazing Edna's head and leaving her injured. The attacker then turned the weapon on Carl, fatally shooting him and then fleeing, stealing cash and the couple's car. Carl was buried with full military honors at Arlington National Cemetery.

His murderer, 19-year-old Jesse Fanus, was apprehended one week later. In April 1999, he was convicted on two counts of aggravated murder (and 11 additional felony charges) and sentenced to death. In 2003, his conviction and death sentence were upheld by the Oregon Supreme Court. In December 2011, the sentence was overturned based on the prisoner's inadequate legal representation. Fanus was sentenced to life in prison without the possibility of parole on May 7, 2015.

Carl's widow Edna died in 2007. His two children were Bruce and Lyanne.

== Awards and legacy ==
Carl's decorations include (having declined any personal medals for service in Vietnam):

Naval Aviator Badge
Navy Cross w/ one Gold Star		Legion of Merit w/ Combat "V" and three Gold Stars
Distinguished Flying Cross w/ four Gold Stars	Air Medal w/ two Silver Stars and two Gold Stars	Air Medal
Combat Action Ribbon	Presidential Unit Citation w/ two Bronze Stars	American Defense Service Medal
American Campaign Medal	Asiatic-Pacific Campaign Medal w/three Bronze Stars	World War II Victory Medal
National Defense Service Medal w/ one Bronze Star	Armed Forces Expeditionary Medal	Vietnam Service Medal w/ two Bronze Stars
Korean Defense Service Medal	Republic of Vietnam Gallantry Cross	Vietnam Campaign Medal

=== First Navy Cross citation ===
Citation:

The President of the United States of America takes pleasure in presenting the Navy Cross to Captain Marion Eugene Carl (MCSN: 0-6053), United States Marine Corps, for extraordinary heroism and distinguished service in the line of his profession while serving Section Leader and a Pilot in Marine Fighting Squadron TWO HUNDRED TWENTY-ONE (VMF-221), Marine Air Group TWENTY-TWO (MAG-22), Naval Air Station, Midway, during operations of the U.S. Naval and Marine Forces against the invading Japanese Fleet during the Battle of Midway on 4 June 1942. Leading his section in a dauntless and aggressive attack against a vastly superior number of Japanese bomber and fighter planes, Captain Carl aided in the disruption of enemy plans and lessened the effectiveness of their attack. As a result of his daring tactics, he succeeded in destroying one OO Isento KI Navy Fighter. The courageous leadership and utter disregard for personal safety displayed by Captain Carl in this attack were in keeping with the highest traditions of the United States Naval Service.

=== Second Navy Cross citation ===
Citation:

The President of the United States of America takes pleasure in presenting a Gold Star in lieu of a Second Award of the Navy Cross to Captain Marion Eugene Carl (MCSN: 0-6053), United States Marine Corps, for extraordinary heroism and distinguished service in the line of his profession while serving as a Pilot in Marine Fighting Squadron TWO HUNDRED TWENTY-THREE (VMF-223), Marine Air Group TWENTY-THREE (MAG-23), FIRST Marine Aircraft Wing, in aerial combat against enemy Japanese forces in the Solomons Islands Area from 24 August 1942 to 9 September 1942. With utter disregard for his own personal safety, Captain Carl, during the period of sixteen days, shot down ten enemy aircraft unassisted, and with the help of another Marine Corps pilot, succeeded in shooting down the eleventh plane. His brilliant daring and conspicuous skill as an airman served as an inspiration to other pilots of his squadron and contributed greatly to the security of the positions of the United States Forces in the Solomon Islands. His courageous and loyal devotion to duty is in keeping with the highest traditions of the United States Naval Service.

- In 1992 Carl was inducted into the Lancaster Aerospace Walk of Honor.
- On July 21, 2001, Carl was enshrined at Dayton, Ohio, in the National Aviation Hall of Fame class of 2001, along with North American X-15 pilot Joe Engle, USAF ace Robin Olds, and Albert Ueltschi.
- In 1984, 1986, 1989, and 1992, Carl was honored at the Air Command and Staff College's Gathering of Eagles at Maxwell Air Base, Montgomery Alabama. This program encourages the study of airpower history by emphasizing the contributions of air and space pioneers.
- Roseburg Regional Airport, in Roseburg, Oregon, was named the Marion E. Carl Memorial Field in his honor.
- MATSG-23 holds an annual "Mud Run" in honor of Carl at the Naval Air Station, Lemoore, California. The 5-mile run includes mud pits, climbing walls, and other military obstacles to challenge the runners. The 13th Annual Mud Run was held on June 6, 2006.
- The airfield at Marine Corps Air Station Kaneohe Bay was named for Carl.

== See also ==
- United States Marine Corps Aviation

== Sources ==
- Major General Marion E. Carl, USMC, Who's Who in Marine Corps History, History Division, United States Marine Corps.

Preceded by Bill Bridgeman	Human altitude record 1953–1954	Succeeded by Arthur W. Murray
