= John Smith (flying ace) =

United States Marine Corps Medal of Honor recipient

John Lucian Smith
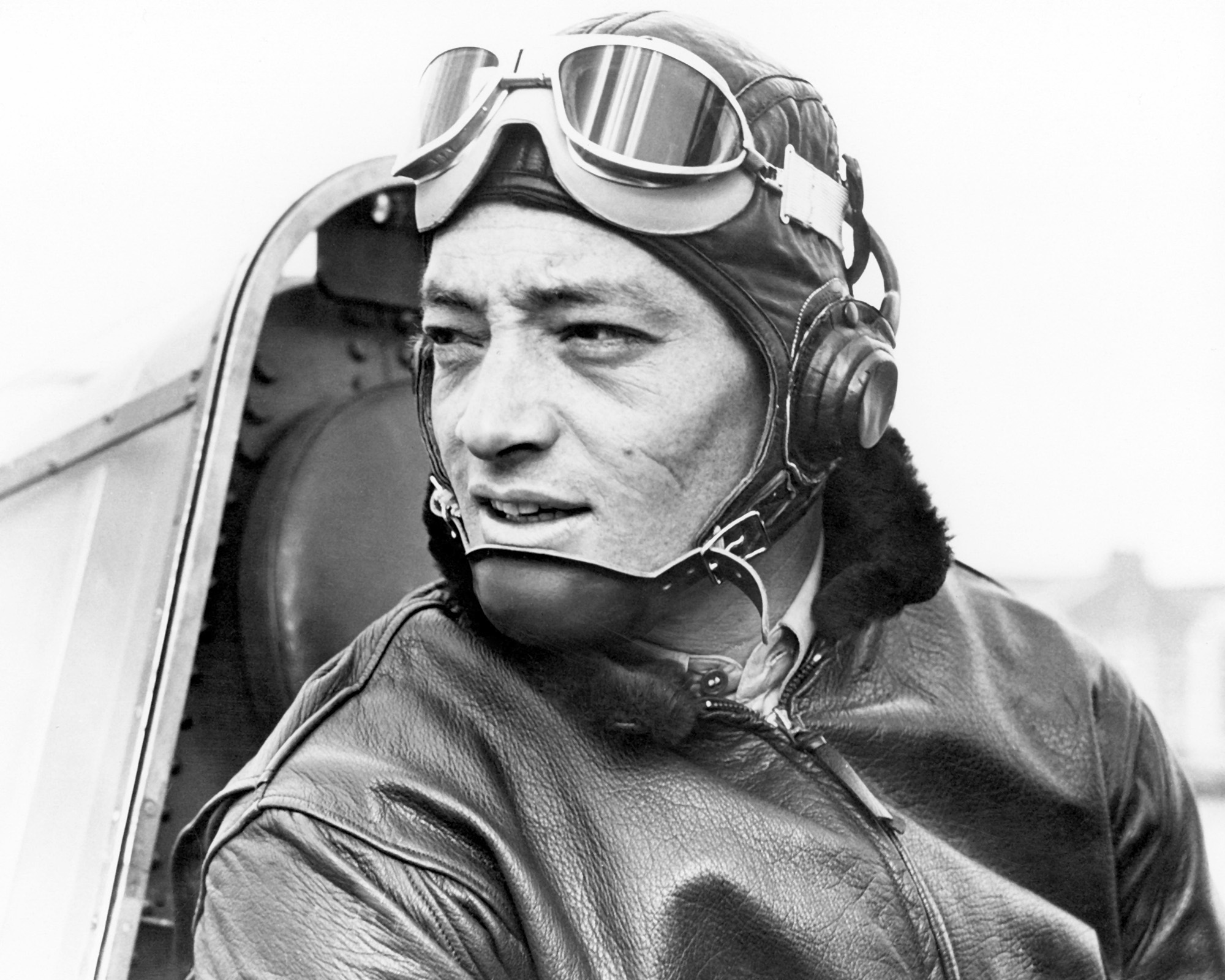
- Smith in February 1943
- Born: December 26, 1914; Lexington, Oklahoma, U.S.
- Died: June 9, 1972 (aged 57); Los Angeles, California, U.S.
- Burial place: Arlington National Cemetery
- Military career
- Allegiance: United States
- Branch: United States Marine Corps
- Service years: 1936–1960
- Rank: Colonel
- Commands: VMF-223; Marine Aircraft Group 33
- Conflicts: World War II; Korean War
- Awards: Medal of Honor; Legion of Merit; Distinguished Flying Cross; Bronze Star Medal; Air Medal (4); Distinguished Service Order (United Kingdom)

John Lucian Smith (December 26, 1914 – June 9, 1972) was an American Medal of Honor recipient and Marine Corps flying ace who, as commanding officer of VMF-223, shot down 19 Japanese planes in World War II and led his squadron to destroy a total of 83 enemy aircraft during the Solomon Islands campaign.

== Early life ==
John Lucian Smith was born on December 26, 1914, in Lexington, Oklahoma. He attended the University of Oklahoma where he was a member of the Reserve Officers Training Corps, graduating in May 1936. During the same month, he was appointed a second lieutenant in the Army Field Artillery, but resigned in July that year to accept a commission in the United States Marine Corps as a second lieutenant.

== Marine aviator ==
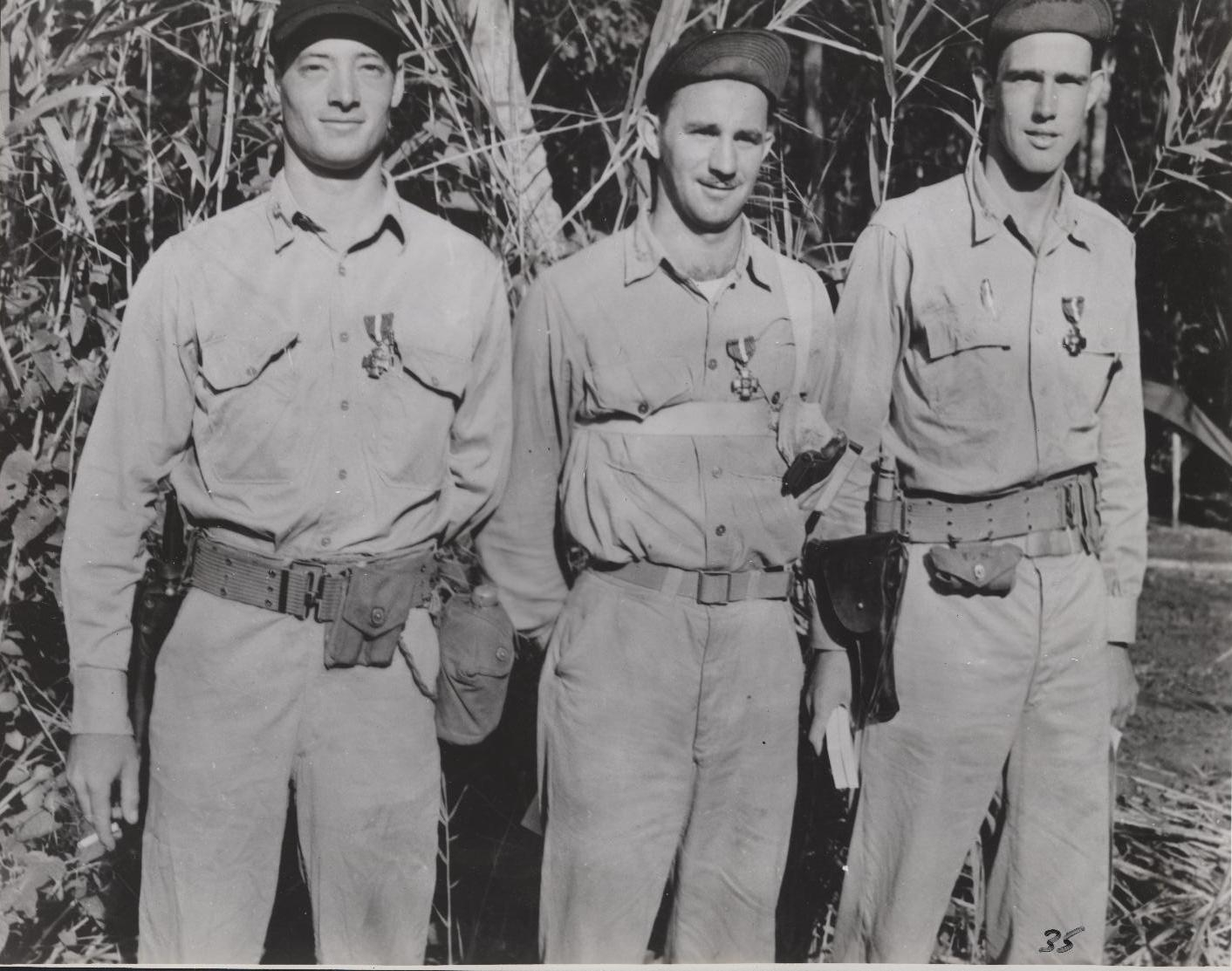
Major John L. Smith, Major Robert E. Galer, and Captain Marion E. Carl pose for a photo after being awarded Navy Crosses for their actions at Guadalcanal.

After receiving his Marine Corps commission, he was ordered to Marine Barracks, Navy Yard, Philadelphia, Pennsylvania, where he attended the Marine Basic School.

Following various duty assignments at Quantico, Virginia, Washington, D.C., and Marine Corps Recruit Depot Parris Island, South Carolina, in 1937, he was transferred to the Naval Air Station, Pensacola in July 1938 to begin flight training. A year later he graduated and was designated a Naval Aviator.

During the crucial battle for the Solomons, he led Marine Fighter Squadron 223 (VMF-223) on sorties against the enemy, during which the squadron accounted for 83 enemy aircraft destroyed.

=== Aerial victory credits ===
Date	Total	Aircraft types claimed (location)
21 Aug 1942	1	1 A6M Zeke destroyed (Cactus)
26 Aug 1942	2	2 Betty bombers destroyed (Cactus)
29 Aug 1942	2	2 Betty bombers destroyed (Cactus)
30 Aug 1942	4	4 A6M Zekes destroyed (Cactus)
09 Sep 1942	1	1 A6M Zeke destroyed (Cactus)
10 Sep 1942	1	1 Betty bomber destroyed (Cactus)
11 Sep 1942	2	2 Betty bombers destroyed (Cactus)
12 Sep 1942	2	2 Betty bombers destroyed (Cactus)
13 Sep 1942	1	1 A6M Zeke destroyed (Cactus)
02 Oct 1942	1	1 A6M Zeke destroyed (Cactus)
03 Oct 1942	2	2 A6M Zekes destroyed (Cactus)
	19	

While on temporary duty in Washington after his return from the Pacific, he was presented the Medal of Honor by President Franklin D. Roosevelt on February 24, 1943.

After several months' duty in Washington, he served as executive officer of Marine Aircraft Group 32, then located at Oahu, Hawaii. A few months later, he moved to the Philippines and took part in the aerial offensives in the Bismarck Archipelago in November and December 1944; moved up to Luzon in the Philippines in January and February 1945; then on to Mindoro and Mindanao, and finally up to the Sulu Archipelago.

For his services in the Philippines during the period November 1944 to June 1945, he was awarded the Legion of Merit for exceedingly meritorious conduct in the performance of outstanding service as executive officer for Marine Aircraft Group 32 in extensive support of ground and surface forces in the liberation of Luzon, Zamboanga Peninsula, the Sulu Archipelago, and Mindanao.

After his return to the United States in June 1945, he served at the Naval Air Station, Jacksonville, Florida, until December 1945, and then was transferred to Quantico, Virginia, to serve as station operations officer. After his duty there and after performing various duties at Cherry Point, North Carolina, Washington, D.C., and Havana, Cuba, in 1946 and 1947, he was detached from duty at the Naval Air Station, Norfolk, Virginia, to perform duty involving flying on the staff of commander, air force, Atlantic Fleet. In November 1948 he was on temporary aviation duty in England, France, and Germany.

Lieutenant Colonel Smith was detailed as Marine Corps Aide to the Chief of Naval Operations, Navy Department, Washington, in December 1949; promoted to colonel on January 1, 1951; and in May 1951, he joined the Staff, Standing Group, of the North Atlantic Treaty Organization, for two years. Following duty with Marine Training Group 10, at the Marine Corps Air Station El Toro, California, he began a year's duty in Korea in July 1953. He served first as commanding officer, Marine Aircraft Group 33, until February 1954, then as assistant chief of staff, G-4 of 1st Marine Aircraft Wing.

Upon his return from Korea, Smith was assigned to Headquarters Marine Corps in August 1954, and entered the National War College, completing the course in June 1955. The following month he was assigned to Marine Corps Schools, Quantico, as a member of the Advanced Research Group, serving in this capacity until July 1956. That August he assumed his duties at Pensacola Naval Air Station as liaison officer on the staff of the chief of Naval Air Training.

Colonel Smith retired from the Marine Corps on September 1, 1960, after which he worked in the defense industry until his suicide on June 9, 1972, in Encino, Los Angeles, California. He is buried at Arlington National Cemetery.

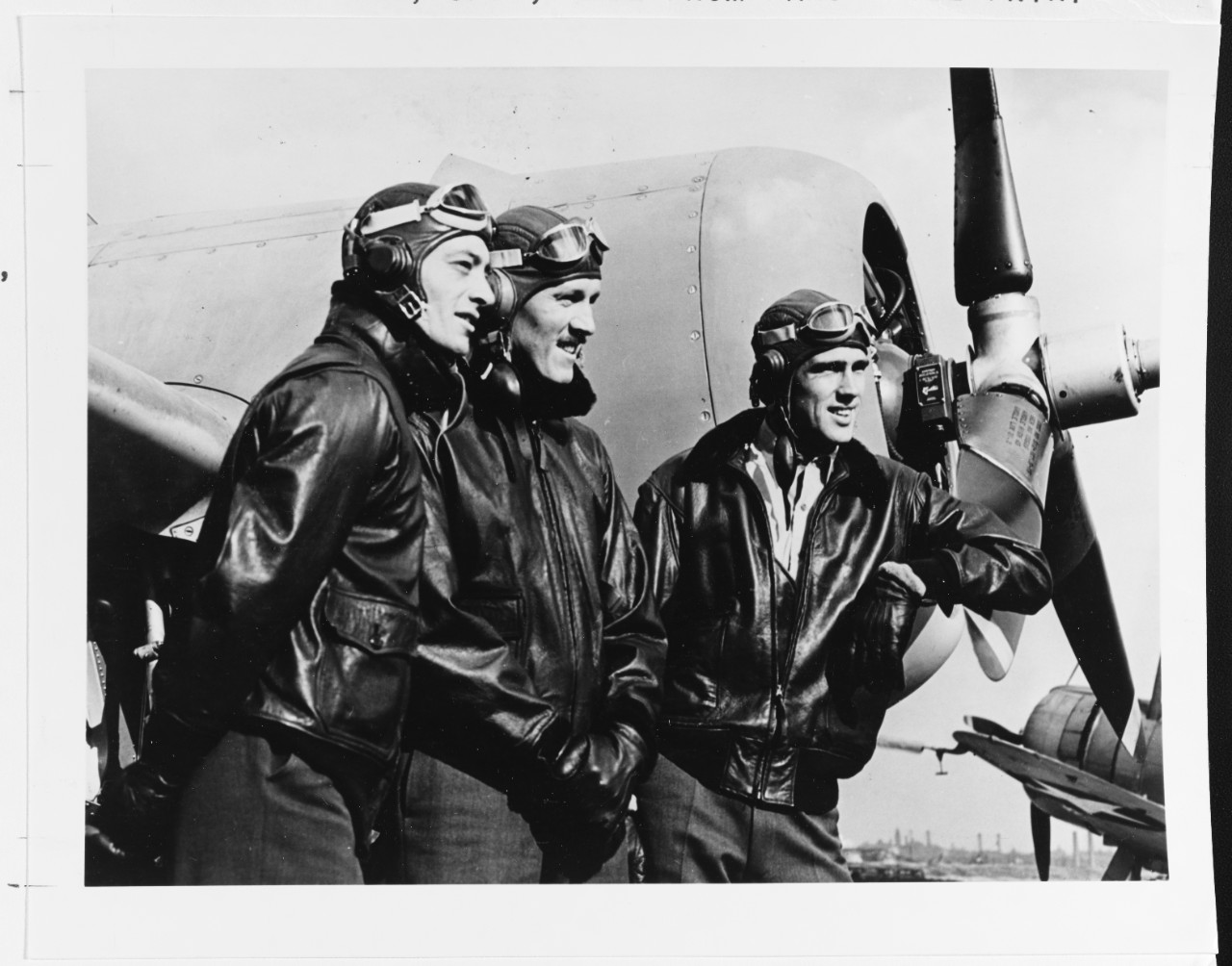
Major John L. Smith, Lieutenant Colonel Richard C. Mangrum, and Captain Marion E. Carl pose for photos after returning to the United States after service in the Cactus Air Force at Guadalcanal in 1942.

== Medal of Honor citation ==
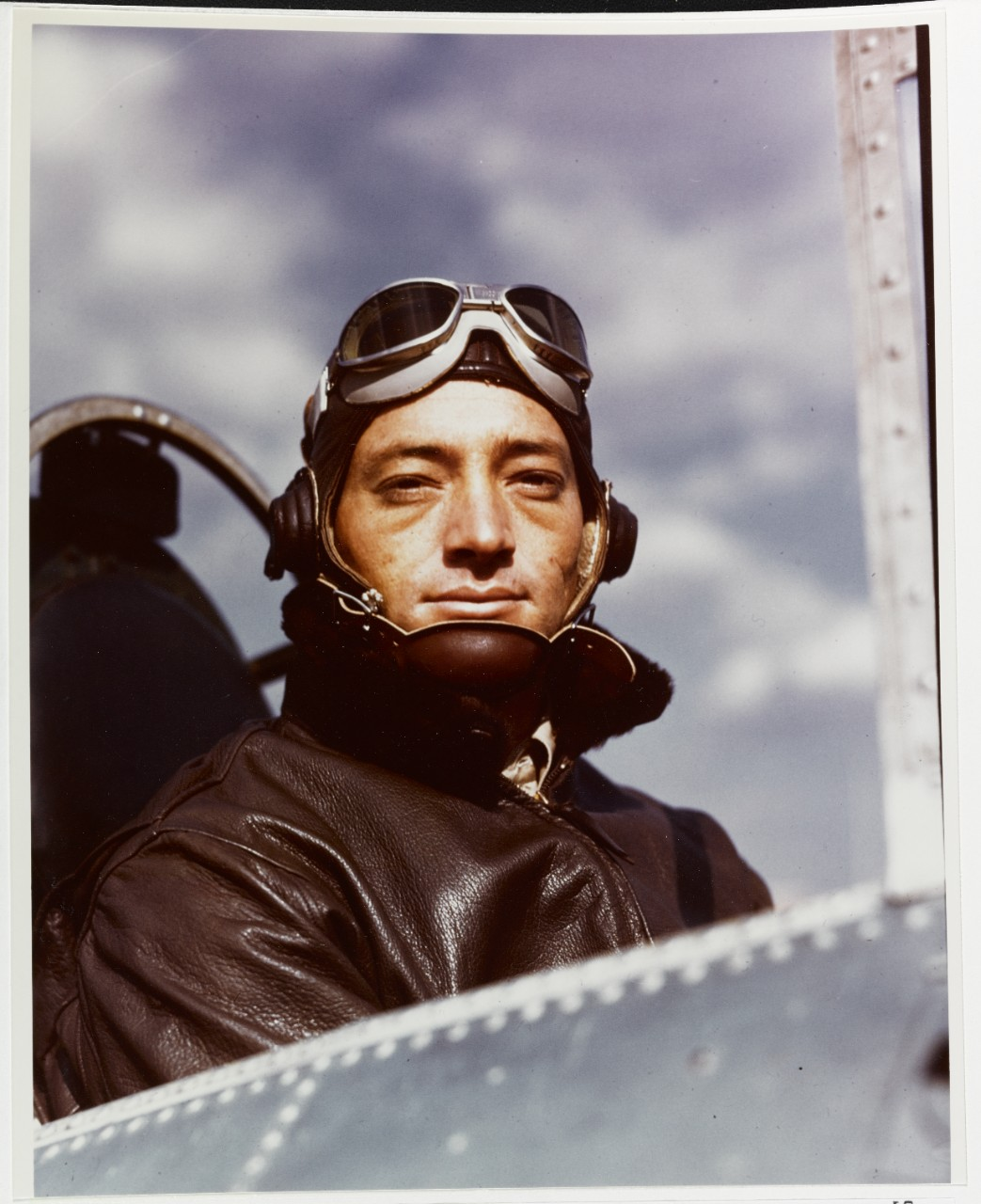
Major John L. Smith, USMC in an aircraft cockpit at Naval Air Station, Anacostia, Washington D.C., in November 1942

The President of the United States takes pleasure in presenting the MEDAL OF HONOR to

MAJOR JOHN L. SMITH
UNITED STATES MARINE CORPS

for service as set forth in the following CITATION:

For conspicuous gallantry and heroic achievement in aerial combat above and beyond the call of duty as Commanding Officer of Marine Fighting Squadron TWO TWENTY-THREE, during operations against enemy Japanese forces in the Solomon Islands Area, August – September, 1942. Repeatedly risking his life in aggressive and daring attacks, Major Smith led his squadron against a determined force, greatly superior in numbers, personally shooting down sixteen Japanese planes between August 21 and September 15, 1942. In spite of the limited combat experience of many of the pilots of this squadron, they achieved the notable record of a total of eighty-three enemy aircraft destroyed in this period, mainly attributable to the thorough training under Major Smith and to his intrepid and inspiring leadership. His bold tactics and indomitable fighting spirit and the valiant and zealous fortitude of the men of his command not only rendered the enemy's attacks ineffective and costly to them but contributed to the security of our advance base. His loyal and courageous devotion to duty sustain and enhance the finest traditions of the United States Naval Service.

/S/ FRANKLIN D. ROOSEVELT

== Awards and Decorations ==

Badge	Naval Aviator Badge		
1st row	Medal of Honor		
2nd row	Legion of Merit with "V" Device	Distinguished Flying Cross	Bronze Star Medal with "V" Device
3rd row	Air Medal with 3 5/16 inch stars	Navy Presidential Unit Citation	Navy Unit Commendation with 1 Service star
4th row	American Defense Service Medal with 'Fleet' clasp	American Campaign Medal	Asiatic-Pacific Campaign Medal with 5 Campaign stars
5th row	World War II Victory Medal	Navy Occupation Service Medal with 'Asia' clasp	National Defense Service Medal
6th row	Korean Service Medal with 1 Campaign star	Philippine Presidential Unit Citation	Korean Presidential Unit Citation
7th row	Philippine Liberation Medal with 2 Campaign stars	United Nations Service Medal Korea	Korean War Service Medal Retroactively awarded, 2003

Distinguished Service Order

United Kingdom

== Other Honors ==
Smith was featured on the cover of the 7 December 1942 issue of Life Magazine.

== See also ==
- Cactus Air Force – VMF-223, with Smith in command, was a part of the Cactus Air Force based out of Henderson Field on Guadalcanal.

== Bibliography ==
- "Colonel John Lucian Smith, USMC, Who's Who in Marine Corps History, History Division, United States Marine Corps. Retrieved on 2006-07-15". Archived from the original on February 14, 2012.
- "Maj John L. Smith, Medal of Honor, 1942, Marine Fighting Squadron 223, Solomon Islands, Medal of Honor citation. Retrieved on 2006-07-15". Archived from the original on July 13, 2007.
