= VMA-223 =

Marine Attacks Squadron 223
- VMA-223 insignia
- Active: 1 May 1942 – present
- Country: United States
- Branch: United States Marine Corps
- Type: Attack squadron
- Role: Close air support, air interdiction
- Part of: Marine Aircraft Group 14; 2nd Marine Aircraft Wing
- Garrison/HQ: Marine Corps Air Station Cherry Point
- Nickname: "Bulldogs"
- Tail Code: WP
- Engagements: World War II; Battle of Guadalcanal; Vietnam War; Operation Sharp Edge; Gulf War; Operation Iraqi Freedom (Iraq War); Invasion of Iraq; Operation Vigilant Resolve; Global war on terrorism; Operation Enduring Freedom; Invasion of Afghanistan

Commanders
- Current commander: Lt. Colonel John B. Cumbie
- Notable commanders: Robert P. Keller; John Lucian Smith

Aircraft flown
- Attack: Douglas A-4 Skyhawk; McDonnell-Douglas AV-8B Harrier II
- Fighter: Brewster F2A Buffalo; Grumman F4F Wildcat; Vought F4U Corsair; Grumman F9F Panther; North American FJ-4B Fury; F-35B Lightning II

Marine Attack Squadron 223 (VMA-223) is a United States Marine Corps fixed wing attack squadron that is transitioning in 2026-27 from McDonnell-Douglas AV-8B Harrier II to F-35B Lightning II fighter jets. The squadron is based at Marine Corps Air Station Cherry Point, North Carolina and falls under the command of Marine Aircraft Group 14 (MAG-14) and the 2nd Marine Aircraft Wing (2nd MAW). The squadron uses "Stone" as its radio callsign.

Marine Attack Squadron (VMA)-223 was one of four AV-8B Harrier squadrons assigned to MAG-14, 2nd MAW. (Note: The four Harrier squadrons were VMA-223, VMA-231, VMA-542 (now VMFA-542), and VMAT-203 (training squadron). VMA-231 retired its last Harrier in May 2025. VMA-542 retired its last Harrier in 2022. VMAT-203 was deactivated in 2021.) As the Harrier is being retired from the Marine Corps, all of the Harrier squadrons have or will transition to the F-35B. In June 2026, VMA-223 retired the Marine Corps' last Harriers.

== Mission ==
The mission of VMA-223 is to provide offensive air support, armed reconnaissance, and air-defense for Marine expeditionary forces.

== History ==
=== World War II ===
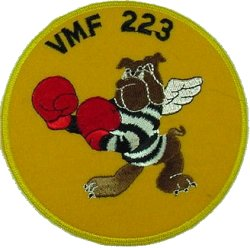
VMF-223 logo during World War II

Marine Fighting Squadron 223 (VMF-223) was commissioned on 1 May 1942 at Marine Corps Air Station Ewa, Oahu, Hawaii. The "Bulldogs" first operational aircraft was the Brewster F2A Buffalo. They left Hawaii for combat equipped with the Grumman F4F Wildcat. VMF-223 became the first fighter squadron committed to combat during the Battle of Guadalcanal when they landed at Henderson Field on 20 August 1942. Upon arriving, the squadron became part of the Cactus Air Force and for the next two months slugged it out with Japanese pilots, based out of Rabaul, for control of the skies over Guadalcanal. VMF-223 departed the island on 13 October 1942 having accounted for 83 enemy aircraft shot down including that of Japanese ace Junichi Sasai. The two leading aces in the squadron were the commanding officer, Major John L. Smith, with nineteen confirmed shoot downs and Marion E. Carl who was credited with sixteen. Smith was to be awarded the Medal of Honor for heroism and Captain Carl would earn the first of his two Navy Crosses for these actions. These victories would come at the cost of six pilots killed and six wounded, and only eight Wildcats still operational.

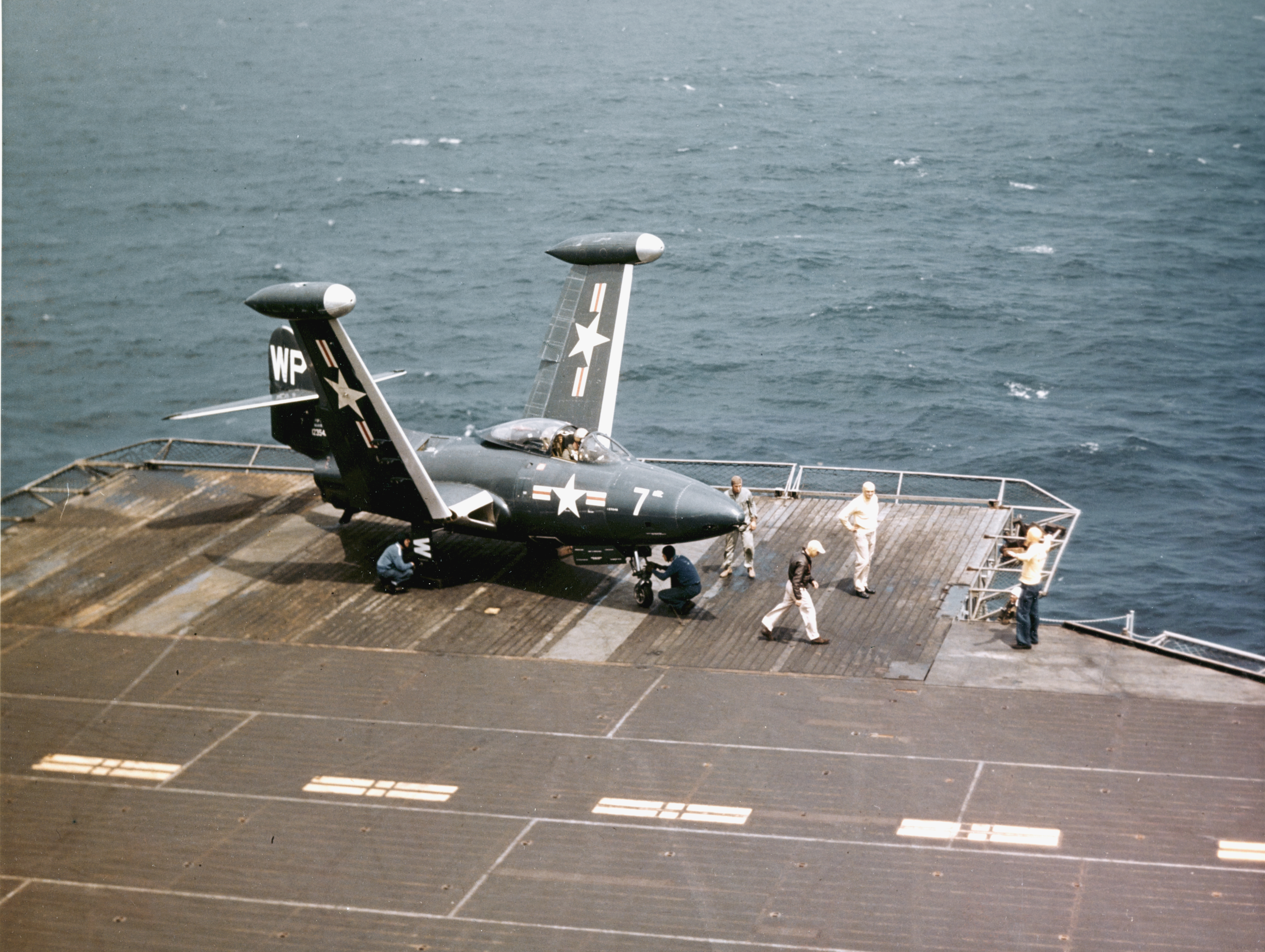
VMF-223 Grumman F9F-2 Panther on USS Franklin D. Roosevelt

After being equipped with the new Vought F4U Corsair, the "Bulldogs" continued to fight in such places as the Philippines and Okinawa. Two Presidential Unit Citations were awarded and affixed to the squadron's battle colors during the war. Following transfer from Marine Corps Air Station El Toro to Marine Corps Air Station Cherry Point in 1948, VMA-223 became a carrier squadron. The squadron deployed to the Mediterranean Sea in 1949 aboard USS Leyte.

The "Bulldogs" entered the Jet Age in July 1950, receiving their first jet aircraft, the Grumman F9F Panther. In August 1957, the squadron was equipped with the North American FJ-4B Fury. A relatively short time later in January 1961, the Fury was replaced by the Douglas A-4 Skyhawk.

=== Vietnam War ===
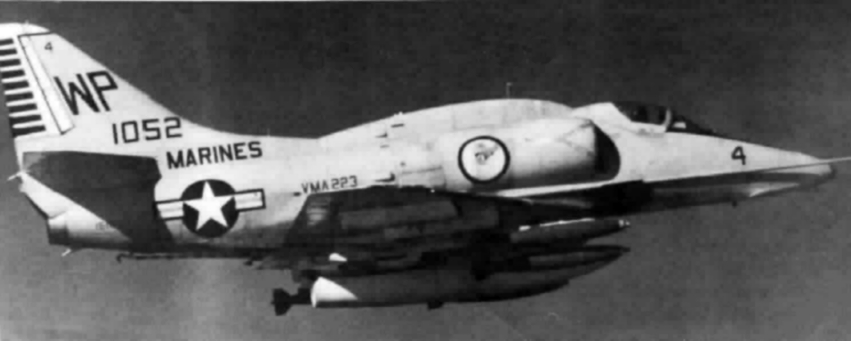
VMA-223 Douglas A-4E Skyhawk during the Vietnam War

In December 1965, the "Bulldogs" once again were called upon for combat duty in the Far East, this time at Chu Lai, South Vietnam. Supporting allied ground forces, they flew more than 32,000 flight hours. In May 1967, the squadron flew a record 1,234 combat sorties, by far the greatest monthly total for any attack squadron operating in Vietnam. In February 1970, after nearly 5½ years in the Far East, the "Bulldogs" were reassigned to the 3rd Marine Aircraft Wing and returned to MCAS El Toro.

=== Post Vietnam & 1990s ===
In May 1975, the squadron received the new A-4M Skyhawk aircraft. During July 1976, VMA-223 transferred from MCAS Yuma to MCAS Iwakuni, Japan. During August 1977, VMA-223 returned from Japan and joined the 2nd Marine Aircraft Wing, stationed at Cherry Point, North Carolina. During the late 1970s until transition in 1987 VMA-223 flew the A-4M Skyhawk. VMA-223 operated the last production A-4M aircraft painted in a special commemorative paint scheme with the flags of all nations who had operated the A-4 Skyhawk on the sides of the fuselage of the aircraft. In October 1987, VMA-223 transitioned to the McDonnell Douglas AV-8B Harrier II.

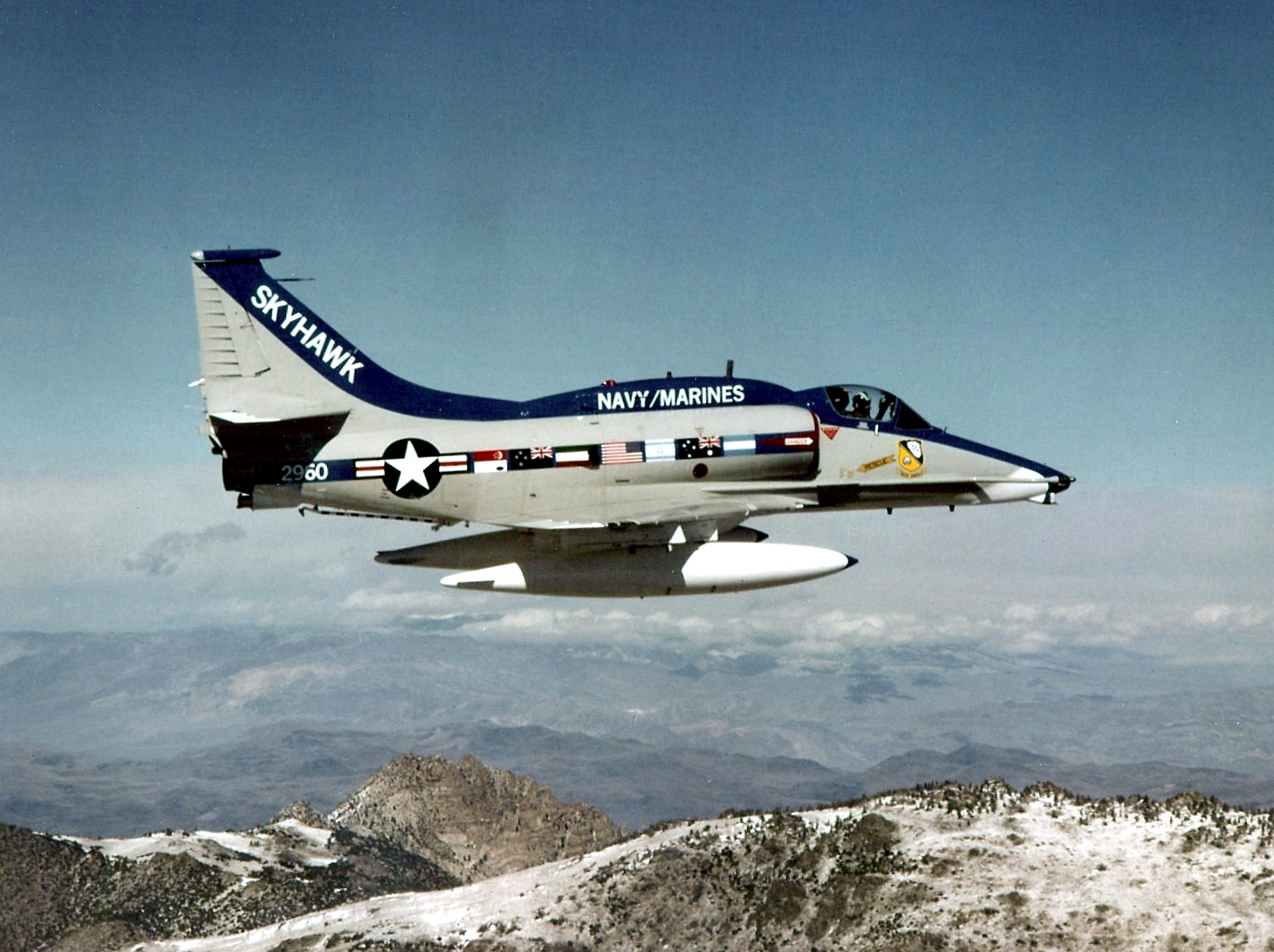
Last built A-4 Skyhawk in flight in February 1979

VMA-223 Harriers carry the distinctive 'rising sun' rudder pattern as an homage to the squadron's history in World War II. In 1989 the a portion of the squadron deployed aboard USS Nassau attached to HMM-264 for a 6-month deployment. They visited Italy, Spain, Portugal, Monaco, France, Israel and other countries.

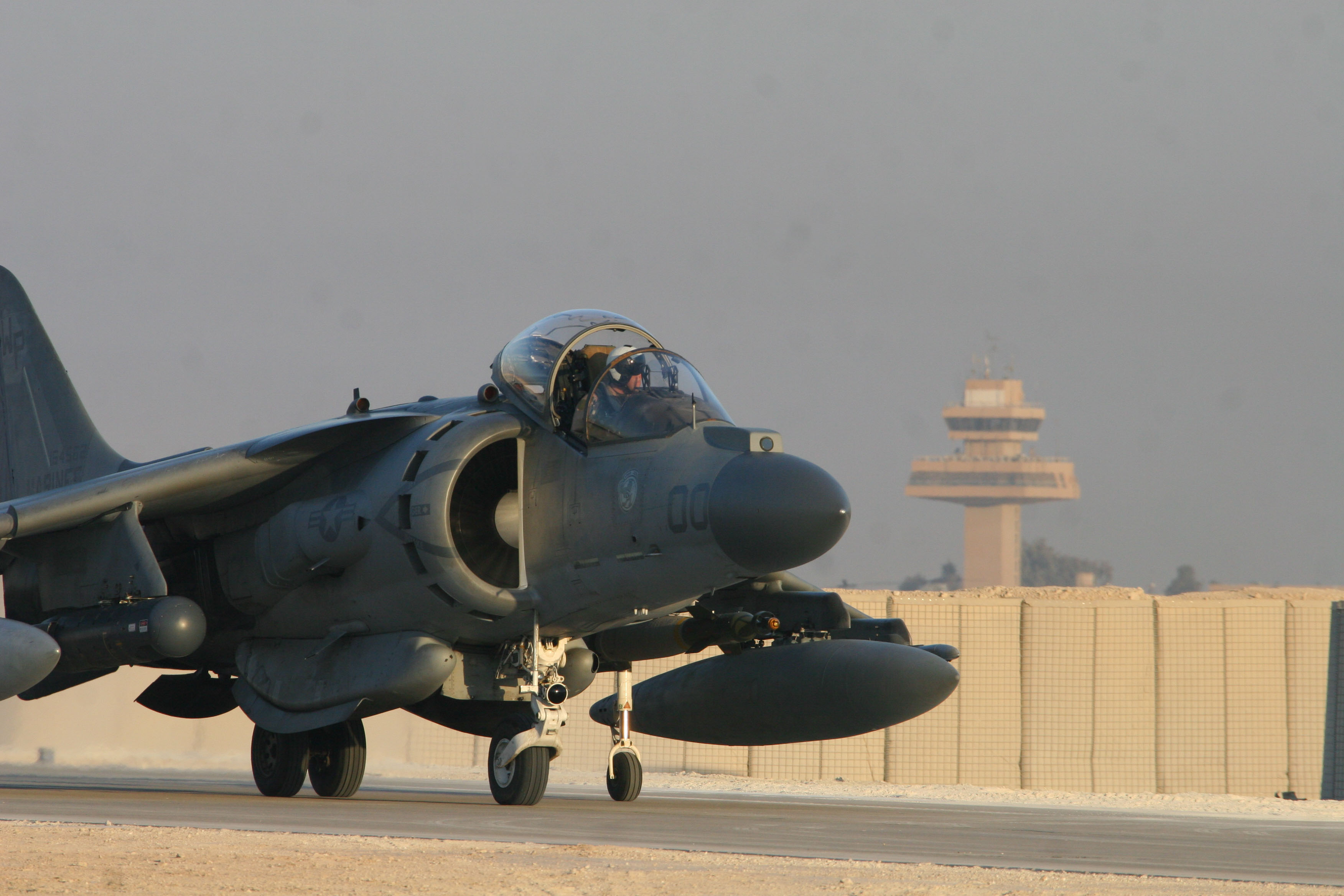
A VMA-223 Harrier taxis at Al Asad Iraq in January 2006

March 1990 marked the second Sixth Fleet Deployment for the "Bulldogs" aboard USS Saipan in support of the 22 MEU. This detachment participated in Operation Sharp Edge, flying armed combat air patrol missions in support of the non-combatant evacuation operations (NEO) over Liberia. In January 1991, the "Bulldogs" deployed a six-plane detachment to Naval Station Rota, Spain for operations in support of Operation Desert Shield and Operation Desert Storm. The Bulldogs briefly occupied the decks of the USS Nassau and the Iwo Jima. The detachment remained at Rota through February, training with Spanish Forces.

=== Global war on terror ===
VMA-223 flew combat missions over Afghanistan in the beginning phases of Operation Enduring Freedom in 2001–2002. In January 2003, the squadron deployed on board USS Kearsarge as part of the 2nd Marine Expeditionary Brigade (2nd MEB). After arriving in the Northern Persian Gulf it cross-decked to USS Bataan and began flying combat missions in support of the 2003 invasion of Iraq. During this time, the squadron surpassed 50,000 mishap-free flight hours.

VMA-223 deployed to Iraq late in the summer of 2005 in support of Operation Iraqi Freedom. During a combat mission over Iraq on 10 February 2006 the squadron surpassed the 60,000 Class A mishap-free hours mark. This milestone is even more impressive considering the maintenance and safety issues associated with the AV-8B aircraft. Starting in October 2011, to April 2012 VMA-223 was deployed in support of Operation Enduring Freedom.

=== Future plans and current aircraft flown ===
As of May 29, 2025, (Note: VMA-231 had their final Harrier flight on May 23, 2025, which left VMA-223 the final Marine Corps squadron flying the Harrier.) VMA-223 was the last Marine Corps squadron that still operates the AV-8B Harrier II, with plans to retire it by September 2026 and replace it with the Lockheed Martin F-35 Lightning II.

In fiscal year 2028 VMA-223 is scheduled to reactivate as Marine Fighter Attack Squadron (VMFA)-223 and will begin flying the F-35B Lightning II.

== Squadron aces ==
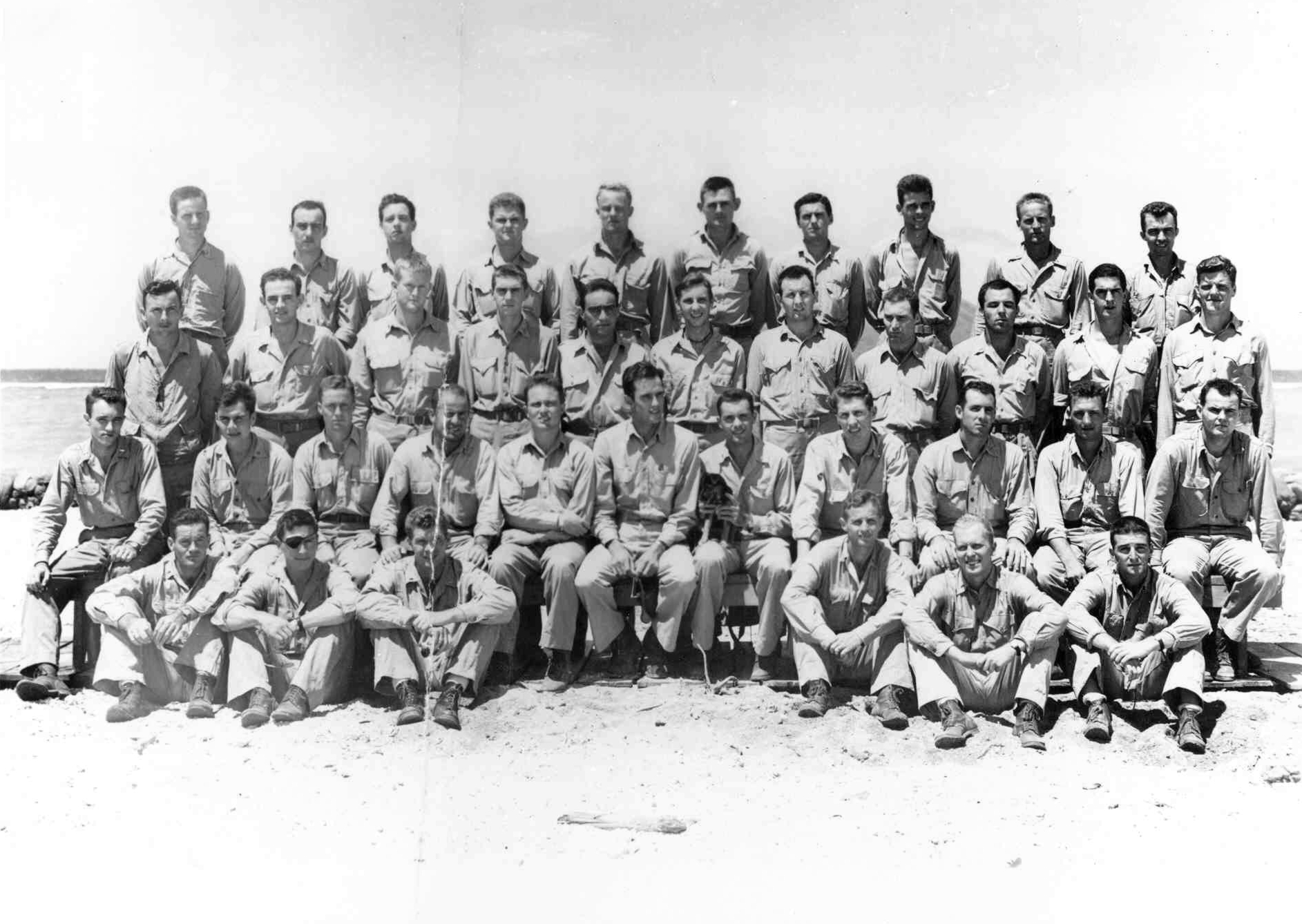
VMF-223 pilots in 1944. Marion Carl is seated in the center.

In USN and USMC aviation squadrons, a flying ace or fighter ace is a naval aviator or naval flight officer credited with shooting down five or more enemy aircraft during aerial combat. The following Marines from VMA-223 have been credited with more than five victories:

- John Lucian Smith – 19.0
- Marion Eugene Carl – 18.5
- Kenneth D. Frazier – 12.5
- Loren D. Everton – 12.0
- Eugene A. Trowbridge – 12.0
- Fred E. Gutt – 8.0
- Frederick R. Payne – 7.5
- Zenneth A. Pond – 6.0
- Charles Kendrick – 5.0
- Hyde Phillips – 5.0
- Orvin H. Ramlo – 5.0

== In the media ==
- Two Harriers from VMA-223 and their pilots were used in the 1994 film True Lies.
- Two AV-8B Harriers from VMA-223 were utilized in the flyover of the NASCAR race in Bristol, Tennessee on 21 August 2010.

== See also ==
- United States Marine Corps Aviation
- List of active United States Marine Corps aircraft squadrons
- List of inactive United States Marine Corps aircraft squadrons
