= Marine Aviation Training Support Group 23 =

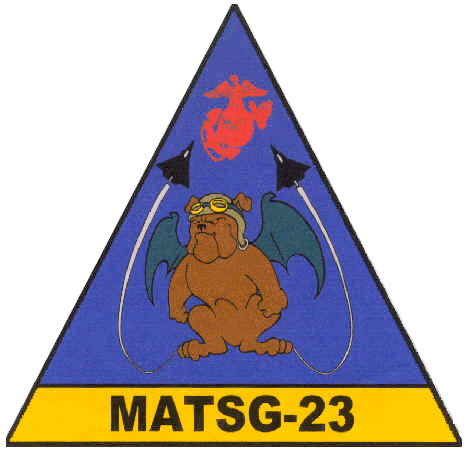
- MATSG-23 insignia
- Active: 1 March 1942 – 1 November 1945; 15 January 1982 - present
- Country: United States
- Branch: United States Marine Corps
- Role: Training
- Part of: Marine Corps Training Command
- Garrison/HQ: Naval Air Station Pensacola
- Nickname: "The Lifeblood of Marine Aviation"
- Engagements: World War II * Battle of Guadalcanal

Commanders
- Current commander: Col. Bridget N. Young
- Executive Officer: LtCol Hunter S. Hayes

Marine Aviation Training Support Group 23 (MATSG-23) is a United States Marine Corps aviation training group originally established during World War II as Marine Aircraft Group 23 (MAG-23). Squadrons from MAG-23, augmented by Navy and Army flying units formed the Cactus Air Force during the Battle of Guadalcanal. Since then it has evolved into the first Aviation Logistics focused Colonel level command, and serves as a functional training advocate for all USMC Aviation Logistics entry-level training. The instructors and support staff of MATSG-23 are responsible for training thousands of Marines per year in the disciplines required to enable the expeditionary aviation required to support the Marine Air Ground Task Force.

== Mission ==
MATSG-23's mission is to serve as the functional training advocate for all USMC Aviation Logistics entry-level training, to include initial accession, primary MOS, Aircraft Maintenance Officer, Aviation Ordnance Officer Career Progression Schools and Air Traffic Control Officer Course. Additionally, as directed by Training Command, MATSG-23 provides administrative and logistical support to regionally located units in order to prepare Marines for service in the Fleet Marine Force.

== History ==
=== World War II ===
Marine Aircraft Group 23 was commissioned at Marine Corps Air Station Ewa, Hawaii, as part of the 2nd Marine Aircraft Wing on 1 March 1942. The group became the first Marine aviation group to meet the Japanese in the South Pacific. They formed the forward echelon of the 1st Marine Aircraft Wing (1st MAW) during the Battle of Guadalcanal and landed its first units at Henderson Field, Guadalcanal on 20 August 1942 when VMF-223 and VMSB-231 were flown off the USS Long Island (CVE-1). Ten days later the group's rear echelon, composed of VMF-224 and VMSB-232, joined the forward echelon at Henderson Field. MAG-23, augmented by Army and Navy land based air under the operational control of 1st MAW, furnished air support to the 1st Marine Division and Army ground forces in the struggle for Guadalcanal. The Group composed of only four Marine squadrons, detachments from six Navy carrier squadrons (VS-5, VB-6, VF-5, VS-71, VT-8 and VS-3), and the 67th Fighter Squadron (USAAF). This heterogeneous group shot down 244 enemy planes in four weeks. Navy pilots accounted 44, Army flyers, using P-400s shot down eight. The remaining 192 were credited to Marines. Though MAG-23 suffered casualties as well (22 Marine pilots killed in action, three by enemy naval gunfire), their actions were vital in the legendary Marine victory at Guadalcanal. From Guadalcanal, MAG-23 was transferred to the Naval Air Station San Diego where it served as a part of Marine Air, West Coast from 18 November 1942 until 9 January 1943. The group was then transferred to Marine Corps Air Station El Toro until September 1943. On 19 September 1943, the group again landed at MCAS Ewa and remained there as part of Marine Air Hawaiian Area until May 1944. On 8 May 1944, the group transferred to Midway Atoll where it remained until the war ended. After the war, MAG-23 returned to the West Coast and was decommissioned on 1 November 1945.

=== 1980s to Present ===
Marine Aviation and Training Support Group 23 (MATSG-23) was formally activated on 15 January 1982 with a mission of providing administrative and limited logistics support to Marines permanently and temporarily assigned to NAS Lemoore in support of F/A-18 maintenance, operations and training.

On 2 July 1982 VMFA-314 arrived at NAS Lemoore as the first squadron to transition to the F/A-18 Hornet. By the end of June 1983 the first three Marine F/A-18 squadrons had completed their transition at VFA-125. A new chapter in Fighter Aviation had begun. Over the years, F/A-18 training switched from whole units to individual Marines destined to replace Marines in FMF.

In May 2000 the Commandant of the Marine Corps directed the re-designation of all Marine Aviation Training Support Groups to promote a sense of Marine Corps identity and tradition. This re-designation utilized the numbers of previously decommissioned groups allowing them and their rich history to live on in the annuals of Naval Aviation.

On 7 June 2013, the Commandant of the Marine Corps approved the reorganization of the existing five MATSGs headquarters into three MATSG headquarters. MATSG-23 was directed to reorganize and relocate from NAS Lemoore, Ca to NAS Pensacola, FL and assume administrative support for initial accession schools.

MATSG-23 consists of a headquarters element supporting three squadrons and two detachments to include: Aviation Maintenance Squadron 1, Aviation Maintenance Squadron 2, Marine Aviation Training Support Squadron 1, Center for Naval Aviation Technical Training Detachment Eglin Air Force Base, and Marine Detachment Keesler Air Force Base.

The command of MATSG-23 has not limited itself to student throughput. It has taken an active role to improve aviation logistics for the fleet Marine Corps by initiating and supporting important commodity advocacy issues. MATSG-23 is constantly innovating the way Marine aviation support personnel are trained and support/maintain the Aviation Combat Element of the MAGTF.

== Notable former members ==
- David Douglas Duncan, as a 2d Lieutenant in World War II
- William J. Wallace as Colonel commanded MAG-23 at Guadalcanal

== See also ==
- List of United States Marine Corps aircraft groups
