= Loren D. Everton =

US Marine Corps officer (1915–1991)

Loren Dale Everton
- Born: July 14, 1915; Crofton, Nebraska, US
- Died: February 15, 1991 (aged 75); Santa Ana, California, US
- Burial place: El Toro Memorial Park; Lake Forest, California
- Military career
- Allegiance: United States
- Branch: United States Army; United States Marine Corps
- Service years: 1937–1967
- Rank: Colonel
- Nickname: "Doc"
- Units: VMF-212; VMF-223
- Commands: VMF-113; VMF-122
- Conflicts: World War II: Guadalcanal campaign
- Awards: Navy Cross; Distinguished Flying Cross; Purple Heart

Loren Dale Everton (July 14, 1915 – February 15, 1991) was a highly decorated United States Marine Corps colonel. He was a flying ace credited with shooting down twelve enemy planes and was awarded the Navy Cross during World War II.

== Early life and service ==
Loren D. Everton was born on July 14, 1915, in Crofton, Nebraska. At the age of 17, he earned his flying license. He graduated from Crofton High School in 1933 and attended the College of Pharmacy at the University of Nebraska, where he was a member of the Army Reserve Officers' Training Corps. Upon graduating from the university in 1937, Everton was commissioned as a second lieutenant in the United States Army Reserve.

In 1939, Everton resigned from the Army and enlisted in the Marine Corps in order to attend flight training at Naval Air Station Pensacola, Florida. Upon completing flight training, he was stationed at Midway Atoll, and was there on December 7, 1941, when the Japanese attacked Pearl Harbor.

== World War II ==
With the United States drawn into World War II, Captain Everton was assigned to Marine Fighting Squadron 212 (VMF-212) in Hawaii. While VMF-212 was on the island of Efate, Vanuatu in early August 1942, Everton's commanding officer, Lieutenant Colonel Harold W. Bauer, temporarily transferred him to another squadron. The other squadron, Marine Fighting Squadron 223 (VMF-223), was heading towards Guadalcanal to take part in the upcoming battle there and needed experienced pilots. On August 20, VMF-223 flew 200 miles from the aircraft carrier USS Long Island to Henderson Field on Guadalcanal.

On the morning of August 21, the commanding officer of VMF-223, Captain John Smith, ordered Everton to lead a flight of F4F Wildcats to investigate reports of Japanese troops landing on a beach. Everton and the pilots under his charge strafed a great number of Japanese soldiers on the beach, marking the first combat action of VMF-223. On August 26, Everton saw his first air-to-air combat. He shot down three Mitsubishi G4M "Betty" bombers, and probably shot down a fourth.

On September 1, the transfer pilots from VMF-212 were relieved and returned to Efate. Captain Everton returned to Guadalcanal with his original squadron, VMF-212, on October 16. On October 18, he co-led a mission with Frederick Payne to intercept Japanese bombers and he personally downed two planes, including an A6M Zero.

Two days later on October 20, Captain Everton and VMF-212 engaged several dozen Betties and Zeros. Everton was about to down a Zero when his F4F was riddled by machine gun and cannon fire. Two 20mm shells exploded in the cockpit, severely wounding Everton in the leg. Everton's plane spiraled out of control for several thousand feet before he regained control. Everton then returned to Henderson Field and made an emergency landing. What remained of his aircraft was sent to the scrap pile and he was medically evacuated from Guadalcanal.

Captain Everton was credited with seven aerial victories from August to October 1942. He was awarded the Navy Cross, Distinguished Flying Cross, and Purple Heart during this period.

After recovering from his wounds in January 1943, Major Everton became the commanding officer of Marine Fighting Squadron 113 (VMF-113). While serving as commanding officer of VMF-113, Everton participated in long range escorts for bombers. He also shot down several more Japanese aircraft, bringing his total number of victories to 12 and earning the title of double ace.

== Later career and life ==
After the war, Everton served as the commanding officer of Marine Fighting Squadron 122 (VMF-122). He served in a number of other assignments before retiring with the rank of colonel in June 1967.

Loren D. Everton died on February 15, 1991, in Santa Ana, California. He was buried in El Toro Memorial Park in the nearby town of Lake Forest, California.
