= Woodruff, Kansas =

Unincorporated community in Phillips County, Kansas

- CDP
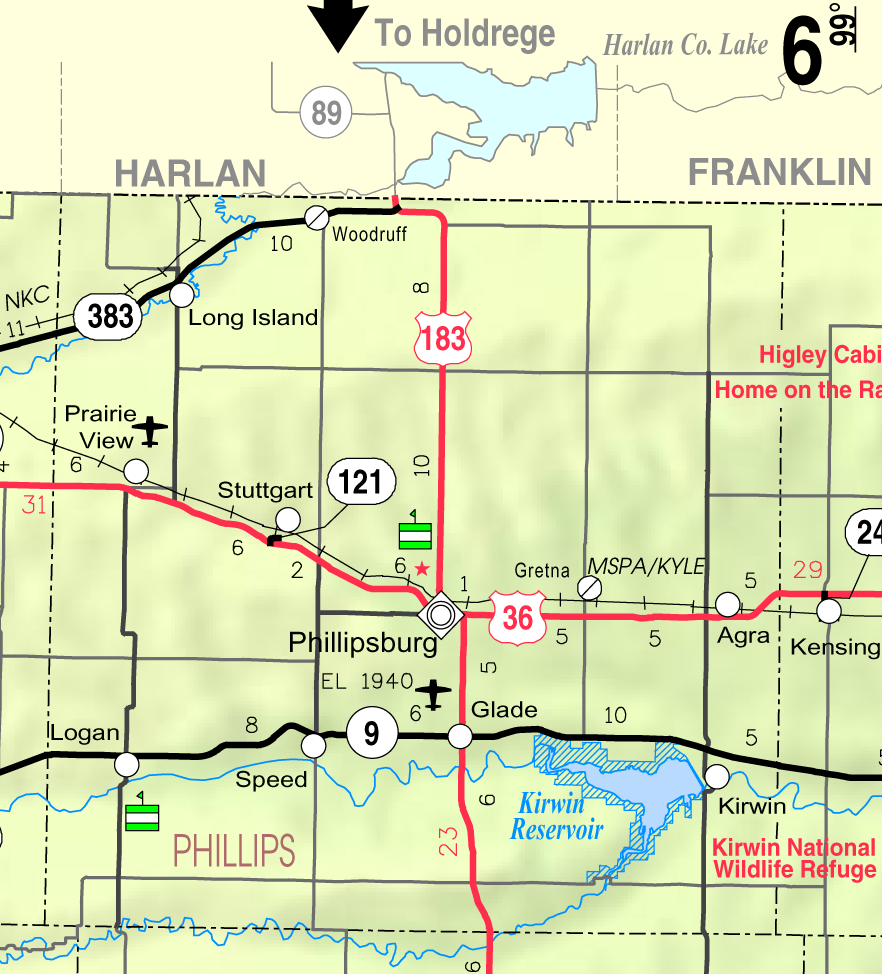
- KDOT map of Phillips County (legend)

- Location within the state of Kansas Woodruff (the United States)
- Coordinates: 39.9927881°N 99.4264895°W
- Country: United States
- State: Kansas
- County: Phillips
- Elevation: 2,001 ft (610 m)

Population (2020)
  - Total: 13
- Time zone: UTC-6 (CST)
  - Summer (DST): UTC-5 (CDT)
- Area code: 785
- FIPS code: 20-80400
- GNIS ID: 471768

Woodruff is a census-designated place (CDP) in Phillips County, Kansas, United States. As of the 2020 census, the population was 13.

== History ==
A post office was opened in Woodruff in 1885, and remained in operation until it was discontinued in 1956.

== Demographics ==
Historical population
Census	Pop.	Note	%±
2020	13		—
U.S. Decennial Census

== Notable people ==
- Harold W. Bauer, World War II flying ace, posthumously awarded Medal of Honor
- Hollis Caswell, educator
