= Hugh M. Elwood =

U.S. Marine Corps Lieutenant General

Hugh McJunkin Elwood
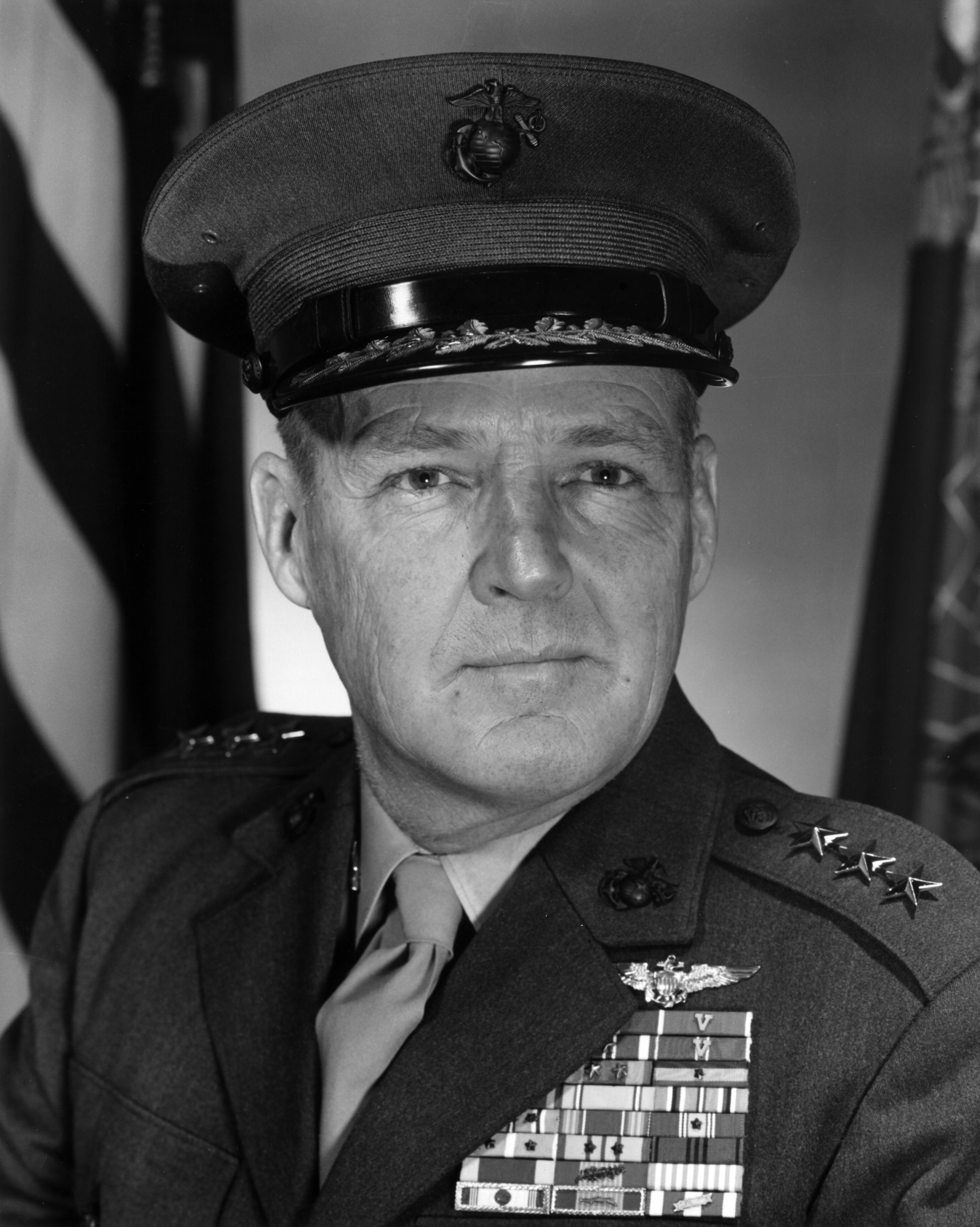
- Elwood as Lieutenant General
- Born: November 15, 1915; Pittsburgh, Pennsylvania, US
- Died: April 18, 2008 (aged 92); Pagosa Springs, Colorado, US
- Burial place: Arlington National Cemetery
- Military career
- Allegiance: United States of America
- Branch: United States Marine Corps
- Service years: 1932–1973
- Rank: Lieutenant general
- Nickname: "Chick"
- Service number: 0-5806
- Commands: 2nd Marine Aircraft Wing; 4th Marine Aircraft Wing; Marine Aircraft Group 32; Marine Fighting Squadron 212
- Conflicts: World War II; Solomon Islands campaign; Bougainville campaign; New Britain campaign; Korean War; Vietnam War; Operation Hastings; Operation Colorado; Operation Desoto
- Awards: Distinguished Service Medal (2); Legion of Merit; Distinguished Flying Cross (2); Air Medal (3); Bronze Star Medal

Hugh McJunkin Elwood (November 15, 1915 – April 18, 2008) was a highly decorated flying ace in the United States Marine Corps during World War II. A veteran of three conflicts, he remained in the Marines and reached the rank of lieutenant general. Elwood completed his career as deputy chief of staff (plans and programs) in 1973 after 40 years of service.

== Early years and World War II ==
Hugh M. Elwood was born on November 15, 1915, in Pittsburgh, Pennsylvania, as the son of Robert and Camelia Keller. He graduated from the Oakmont High School in Oakmont, Pennsylvania, in June 1932 and enlisted in the Marine Corps on August 2 that year for duty as a field musician. Elwood was ordered for recruit training to Marine Barracks Parris Island, South Carolina and subsequently served consecutively with the Marine detachments aboard USS Antares, USS Chicago and USS Sirius.

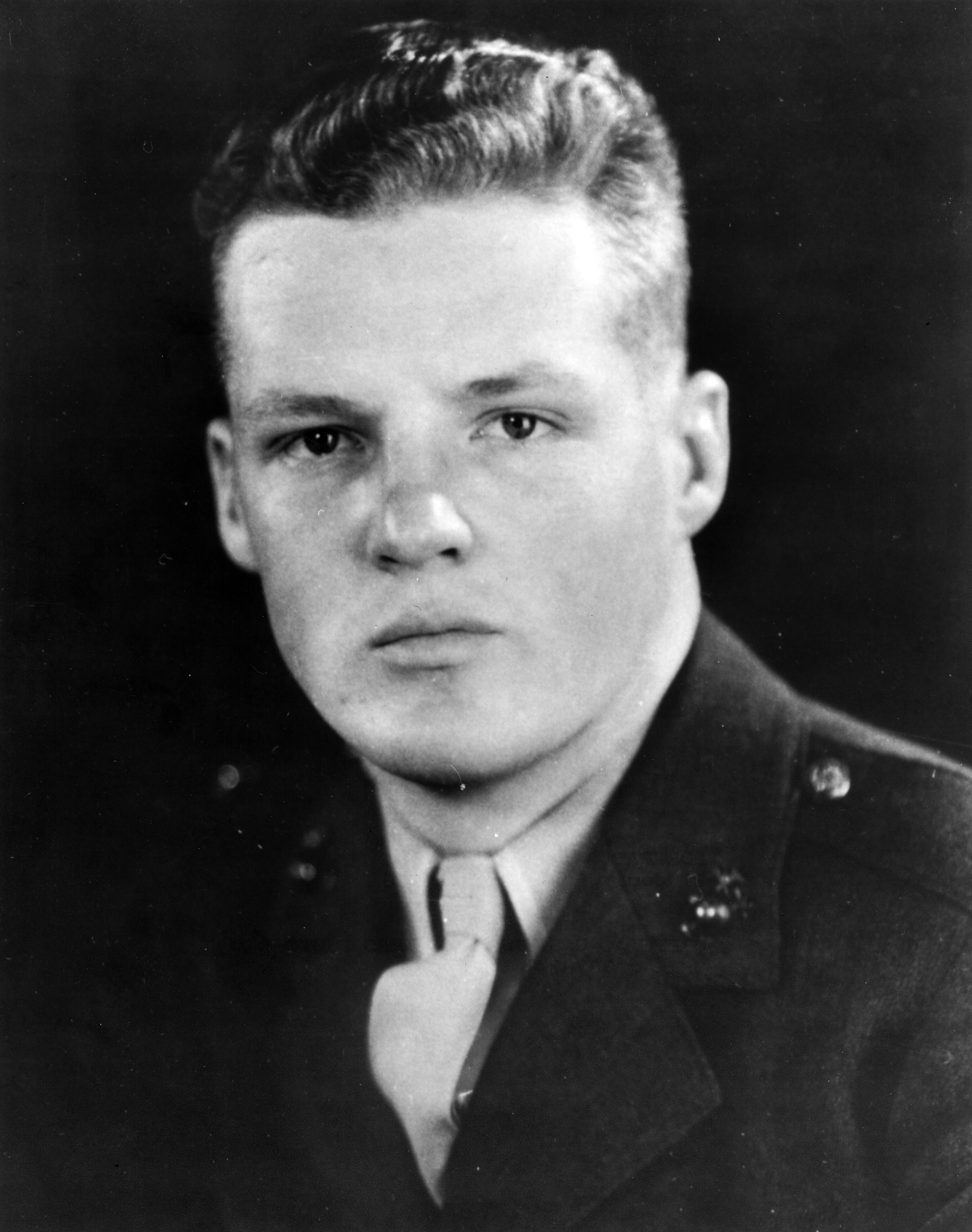
Elwood as 2nd lieutenant in 1938

In late 1933, Elwood was ordered to the Naval Academy Preparatory School in Norfolk, Virginia, and following the completion in July 1934, he received an appointment to the United States Naval Academy at Annapolis, Maryland. While at the academy, he was active in the Glee club and also played football and was a member of the outdoor rifle team.

Elwood graduated with a Bachelor of Science degree on June 2, 1938, and was commissioned a second lieutenant in the Marine Corps on that date. He was subsequently ordered to the Basic School at Philadelphia Navy Yard for Marine Officer Instruction, which he completed in June 1939. While at the Basic School, among his instructors were several future distinguished officers like Chesty Puller, Leonard B. Cresswell, Roy M. Gulick, Howard N. Kenyon and Russell N. Jordahl.

Also many of his classmates reached general's rank later in their services and among them were: Gregory „Pappy“ Boyington, Lowell E. English, Carl J. Fleps, Edward H. Hurst, Charles J. Quilter, Donn J. Robertson and Alvin S. Sanders. Elwood was in the great company of professionals since the beginning of his career.

Following the completion of the Basic School, he was attached to the Marine detachment at Marine Corps Institute at Marine Barracks, Washington, D.C., which he later commanded until mid-1940, when he applied for flight training. Elwood was subsequently ordered to the Naval Air Station Pensacola, Florida and was designated Naval Aviator on March 17, 1941.

He then served as an instructor at Pensacola and was promoted to first lieutenant in June 1941 and following the United States entry into World War II, to captain in February 1942. Elwood was then ordered to the Naval School of Photography and upon the completion of instruction served as Communications officer with the Marine Photographic Squadron.

In March 1943, Elwood was finally ordered to the South Pacific and assumed duty as aide-de-camp to the commanding general of Marine Aircraft Wings, Pacific, Major general Ross E. Rowell. He was promoted to major one month later. Elwood requested to be assigned to a combat unit and was appointed executive officer of Marine Fighting Squadron 212 ("Hell Hounds") in October 1943.

Following the transfer of commanding Officer Stewart B. O'Neill, he assumed command of the squadron and took part in the Solomon Islands Campaign. Elwood was stationed at Vella Lavella and took part in the combats at Bougainville and later at New Britain during the bombing of Rabaul. He distinguished himself during that engagement, shooting down five enemy aircraft and damaged several others while flying a Vought F4U Corsair. For this achievement, Elwood was decorated with Distinguished Flying Cross, Air Medal and was designated Marine Corps Ace.

In April 1944, Elwood was appointed operations officer, Air Defense Command, Marianas and remained in that assignment until October that year, when he was ordered back to the United States. Upon his return stateside, he was ordered to the Command and Staff College at Quantico, Virginia, which he completed in March 1945. While at the Staff College, he was promoted to lieutenant colonel in December 1944.

By the end of April 1945, Elwood was attached to the Naval Aviation Mission to Peru under Major General Ross E. Rowell and served consecutively as operations officer and Inspector General of the Peruvian Air Force. For his service with the Peruvian Naval Aviation Mission, he was decorated with the Peruvian Aviation Cross, 1st Class.

== Postwar service ==
His tour of duty in Peru ended in October 1946, and Elwood returned to the United States for service as commanding officer, Marine Air Detachment, Marine Air Reserve Training Command in St. Louis, Missouri. He served there until July 1949, when he was transferred to the staff of United States Naval Academy at Annapolis, Maryland, as an instructor in the Aviation Department.

=== Korea ===
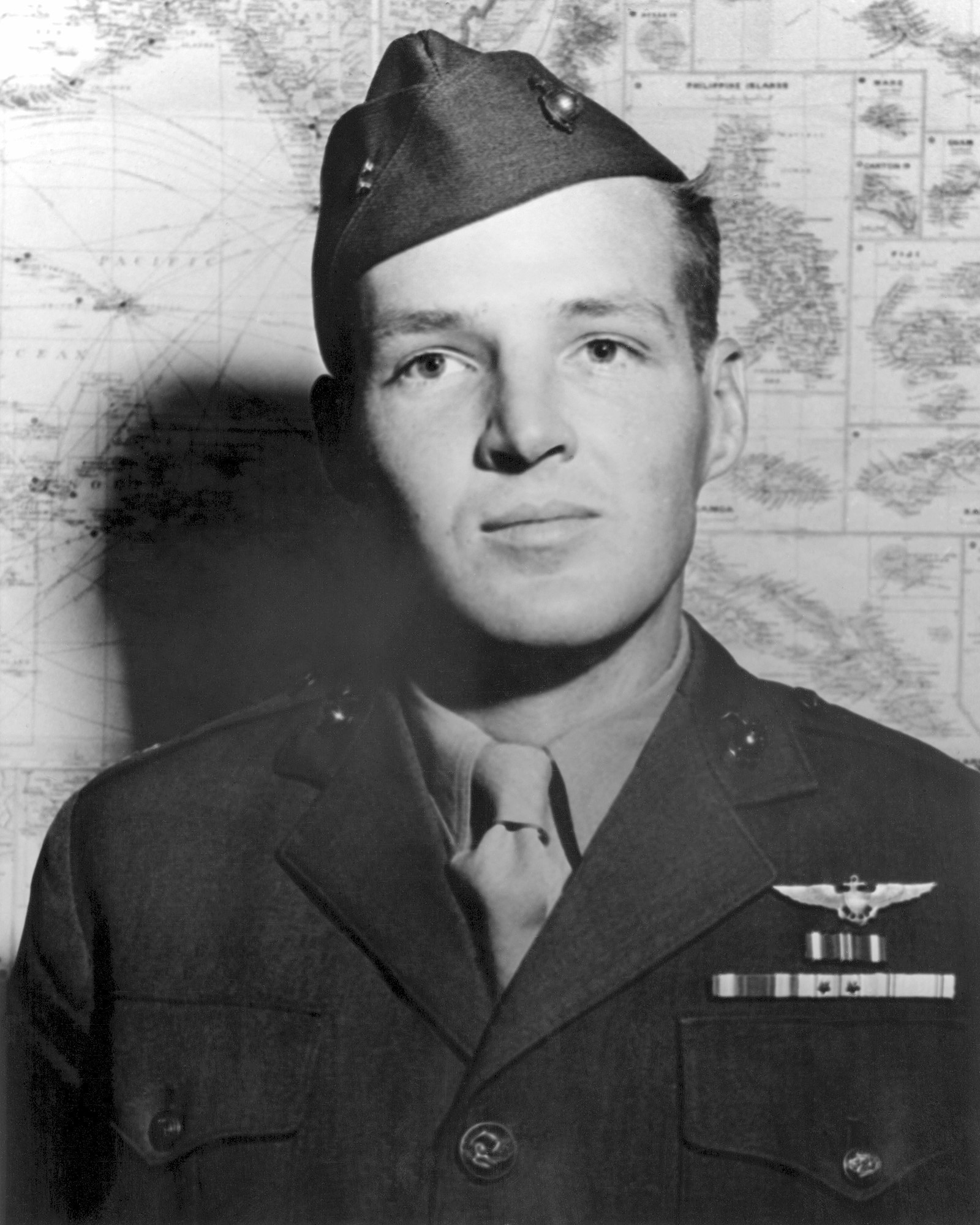
Elwood as Major following his return from South Pacific in late 1944

Elwood was ordered to the Far East during the Korean War in August 1951 and assumed duty as executive officer and tactical officer, Marine Aircraft Group 12, 1st Marine Aircraft Wing under Major General Christian F. Schilt. He distinguished himself on January 26, 1952, when he led his division of twelve planes on an interdiction mission against fifteen hostile tanks, executed a series of devastating bombing and strafing attacks in the face of enemy antiaircraft fire, then escorted damaged plane of his wingman safely back to base.

For this act of valor, Elwood was decorated with his second Distinguished Flying Cross and second Air Medal. He was remained in Korea until summer 1952 and then returned to the United States. Elwood also received the Bronze Star Medal with Combat "V" for his later service with Marine Aircraft Group 12.

=== 1952-1965 ===
Upon his return stateside, Elwood was ordered to the Naval War College at Newport, Rhode Island, where he completed the Strategy and Logistics Course in June 1953. He was then promoted to colonel and ordered to the Marine Corps Schools, Quantico and appointed chief, air section at the Marine Corps Education Center. While at Quantico, Elwood was promoted to colonel in July 1953.

In summer 1956, Elwood served briefly as chief of staff, Amphibious Forces, U.S. Naval Forces, Eastern Atlantic and Mediterranean, before he joined the headquarters of 2nd Marine Aircraft Wing at Marine Corps Air Station Cherry Point, North Carolina. Elwood served as assistant chief of staff for logistics (G-4) and served consecutively under major generals John C. Munn and Arthur F. Binney until May 1957, when he was appointed commanding officer of the Marine Aircraft Group 32.

He was ordered to the Far East in March 1959, where he joined 1st Marine Aircraft Wing at Marine Corps Air Station Iwakuni, Japan as assistant chief of staff for operations (G-3) under Major General Richard C. Mangrum. Elwood participated in the planning of defense of air space of Japan and South Korea until June 1960, when he was ordered back to the United States.

Following his return, he was ordered to Washington, D.C., where he joined the Office of the Joint Chiefs of Staff under General Lyman Lemnitzer as a member of the Basic War Plans Branch in the Plans and Policy Directorate. Elwood was later promoted to the capacity of Chief of the Branch and was transferred to the Headquarters Marine Corps in July 1962. He joined the office of the deputy chief of staff (plans and programs) and served as service plans analysis and review officer under Major General Henry W. Buse Jr. until January 1963, when he was named assistant deputy chief of staff (Plans), at Headquarters Marine Corps, and the following month was promoted to the rank of brigadier general.

Elwood was ordered to the Naval Air Station Glenview, Illinois, in October 1963 and assumed duty as commanding general, Marine Air Reserve Training Command with additional duty as commanding general, 4th Marine Aircraft Wing. While in this capacity, he was responsible for the training of reserve marine aviation units and replacements for units deployed in South Vietnam and elsewhere in the World.

=== Vietnam ===
In April 1966, Elwood was ordered to Da Nang, South Vietnam, and assumed duty as assistant wing commander, 1st Marine Aircraft Wing under Major General Louis Robertshaw. He later described bad relationship with United States Seventh Fleet during the coordination of air attacks on Hanoi and also observed power struggle over operational control over 1st Marine Aircraft Wing (1st MAW) between Fleet Marine Force, Pacific and III Marine Amphibious Force.

Beside that, First MAW provided air cover and transportation of troops during Operation Hastings and Operation Colorado in July and August 1966. Elwood was appointed chief of staff, III Marine Amphibious Force under Lieutenant General Lewis W. Walt at the beginning of December 1966 and remained in that capacity until April 1967. For his service in that capacity, he was decorated with the Legion of Merit with Combat "V" and third Air Medal for participation in flight observation tours. Elwood was also decorated with National Order of Vietnam and Gallantry Cross with Palm by the Government of South Vietnam.

=== Post Vietnam ===
Toward the end of his tour in Vietnam, Elwood was promoted to the rank of major general on March 20, 1967, and upon his return stateside, he served briefly as assistant wing commander, 2nd Marine Aircraft Wing at Marine Corps Air Station Cherry Point, North Carolina, before he succeeded his superior officer Major general Norman J. Anderson as wing's commanding general in May 1967. Elwood was responsible for the training of replacement personnel for aviation units deployed in Vietnam until August 1968, when he was ordered to Hawaii, where he joined the headquarters, United States Pacific Command under Admiral John S. McCain Jr.

He served as assistant chief of staff for operations (J-3) until May 1971 and received the Navy Distinguished Service Medal for his contribution in the creation of operation plans for United States units stretching from the waters off the West Coast of the United States to the west coast of India, and from the Arctic to the Antarctic.

Upon his return stateside, Elwood was promoted to the rank of lieutenant general on May 1, 1971, and assumed duty as deputy chief of staff (plans and programs), at Headquarters Marine Corps. He served in this capacity until June 28, 1973, when he retired after 40 years of active service. Elwood was decorated with a second Navy Distinguished Service Medal during his retirement ceremony.

== Personal life ==
Following his retirement from the Marine Corps, Elwood settled in Atlantic Beach, Florida, and was active in The Marine Corps Heritage Foundation. Lieutenant General Hugh M. Elwood died on April 18, 2008, aged 92, in Pagosa Springs, Colorado. He was buried with full military honors at Arlington National Cemetery, Virginia, together with his wife Harriet Theobald Elwood.

== Decorations ==
Here is the ribbon bar of Lieutenant General Hugh M. Elwood:

Naval Aviator Badge
1st Row	Navy Distinguished Service Medal with 5/16" Gold Star		Legion of Merit with Combat "V"	Distinguished Flying Cross with 5/16" Gold Star
2nd Row	Bronze Star Medal with Combat "V"	Air Medal with two 5/16" Gold Stars	Joint Service Commendation Medal	Navy Presidential Unit Citation with one star
3rd Row	Navy Unit Commendation	American Defense Service Medal	American Campaign Medal	Asiatic-Pacific Campaign Medal with three 3/16 inch bronze service stars
4th Row	World War II Victory Medal	National Defense Service Medal with one star	Korean Service Medal with three 3/16 inch silver service stars	Vietnam Service Medal with two 3/16 inch silver service stars
5th Row	Peruvian Aviation Cross, 1st Class	South Korean Order of Military Merit (Hwarang)	National Order of Vietnam, Knight	Vietnam Gallantry Cross with Palm
6th Row	United Nations Korea Medal	Korean Presidential Unit Citation	Vietnam Gallantry Cross unit citation	Vietnam Campaign Medal

== See also ==
- III Marine Amphibious Force

Military offices
Preceded by Norman J. Anderson	Commanding General, 2nd Marine Aircraft Wing; May 1967 - August 1968	Succeeded by Marion E. Carl
Preceded by Louis Robertshaw	Commanding General, 4th Marine Aircraft Wing; October 1963 - April 1966	Succeeded by Arthur H. Adams
