= Quoin Hill Airfield =

Airport in Vanuatu

- Efate, New Hebrides Islands
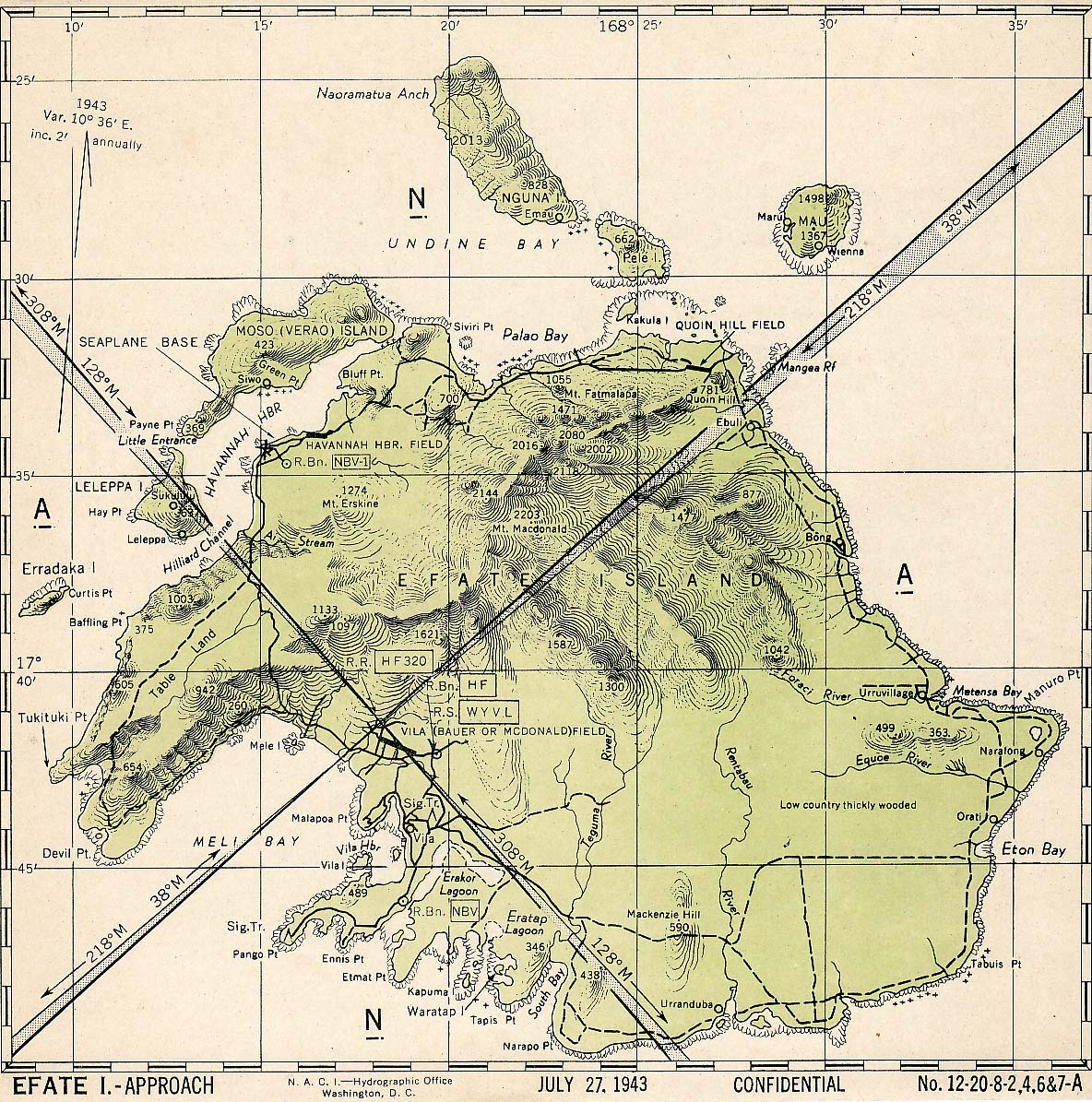
- Map of Efate Island showing military installations 27 July 1943

Site information
- Type: Military Airfield
- Controlled by: United States Navy
- Condition: abandoned

Location
- Coordinates: 17°32′24″S 168°26′31.2″E

Site history
- Built: 1942
- Built by: Seebees
- In use: 1942-5
- Materials: Coral

Quoin Hill Airfield was an airfield in North Efate, in Vanuatu (IATA: UIQ, ICAO: NVVQ). The airfield was used during World War II but is no longer usable as an airstrip.

== History ==
=== World War II ===
With Japanese forces establishing bases on Guadalcanal which threatened the sea route between the U.S. and Australia, Admiral King distributed the joint basic plan for the occupation and defense of Efate on 20 March 1942. Under its terms the US Army was to defend Efate and support the defense of ships and positions. The US Navy's task was: (1) to construct, administer and operate a naval advance base, seaplane base, and harbor facilities; (2) to support Army forces in the defense of the island; (3) to construct an airfield and at least two outlying dispersal fields; (4) to provide facilities for the operation of seaplane-bombers.

On 25 March 1942, the Army sent about 500 men to Efate from Noumea, and the 4th Defense Battalion, 45th Marines, arrived on 8 April. Elements of the 1st Naval Construction Battalion arrived on Efate on 4 May 1942.

A site was chosen for a bomber airfield and in October the Seebees started constructing a 6,000 feet (1,800 m) by 200 feet (61 m) runway which was completed by the middle of January 1943.

US Navy and USMC units based at Quoin Hill included:

- VMF-141
- VMF-212
- VMF-236
- VMFA-212

The base was defended by the 198th Coast Artillery.

== Postwar ==
Abandoned since 1945, an investigation took place in the late 1980s as to whether Quoin Hill could be used as an alternate for Bauerfield International Airport. However, this never came to fruition. Similar redevelopment was proposed in 2015.

== See also ==
- Bauerfield International Airport
- Port Havannah
