= VMFA-212 =

Marine Fighter Attack Squadron 212
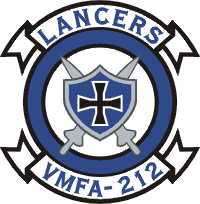
- VMFA-212 Unit insignia Courtesy of www.military-graphics.com
- Active: 1 March 1942 – 11 March 2008
- Country: United States of America
- Branch: United States Marine Corps
- Part of: Inactive
- Nicknames: "Lancers" (since 1963); Hell Hounds (1942-45); The Musketeers (1945); Devil Cats (1950-63)
- Mottos: "Train to Fight, Fight to Win!"
- Tail Code: BD 1946 LD 1947-1957 WD 1957-2008
- Engagements: World War II; Battle of Guadalcanal; Philippines campaign (1944–45); Battle of Okinawa; Korean War; Battle of Chosin Reservoir; Attack on the Sui-ho Dam; Vietnam War; Operation Desert Storm; Operation Southern Watch; Operation Noble Eagle; Operation Enduring Freedom

Commanders
- Notable commanders: LtCol Harold "Indian Joe" Bauer; Hugh M. Elwood; Timothy F. Ghormley

Aircraft flown
- Attack: AD Skyraider; Douglas A-4B Skyhawk
- Fighter: Grumman F4F Wildcat; Vought AU-1 Corsair; North American FJ-4B Fury; Vought F8U Crusader; McDonnell-Douglas F-4J, F-4J/S, F-4S Phantom II; McDonnell-Douglas F/A-18C Hornet

Marine Fighter Attack Squadron 212 (VMFA-212) was a United States Marine Corps F/A-18 Hornet squadron. Most recently known as the "Lancers", the squadron was last based at Marine Corps Air Station Iwakuni, Japan and fell under the command of Marine Aircraft Group 12 (MAG-12) and the 1st Marine Aircraft Wing (1st MAW). VMFA-212 has an extensive combat history having participated in combat operations during World War II, the Korean War, Vietnam War, the Gulf War, and Operation Enduring Freedom. Due to a re-organization within Marine aviation, the squadron was deactivated in 2008.

== Past mission as VMFA ==
Support the Marine Air-Ground Task Force commander by destroying surface targets and enemy aircraft, day or night under all weather conditions during expeditionary, joint or combined operations.

- Conduct sea and air deployment operations.
- Conduct fire support.
- Conduct close air support.
- Conduct interdiction operations.
- Conduct joint suppression of enemy air defenses.
- Conduct air-to-air operations.
- Coordinate battle space maneuver and integrate with firepower.

== History ==
=== World War II ===
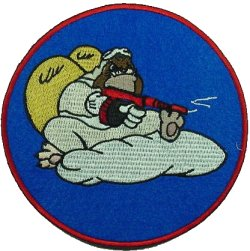
VMF-212 logo during World War II

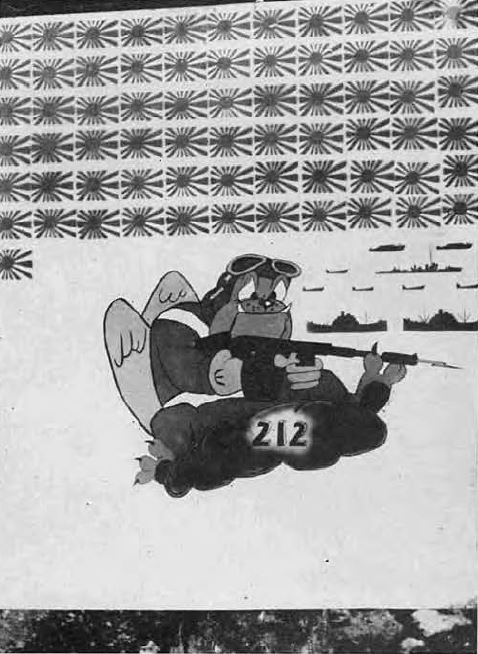
Talley board painted by the 37th Seabees for the 212th

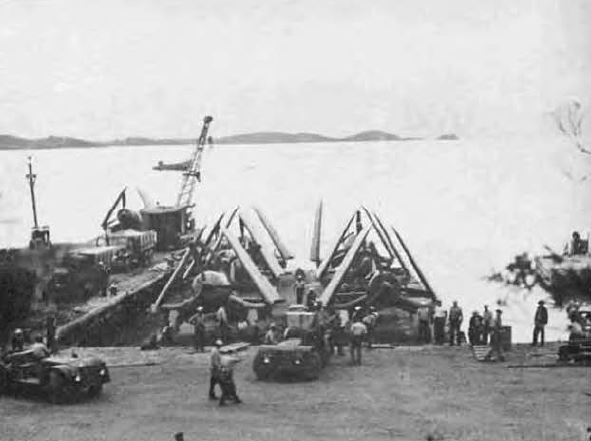
37th Seabees unloading new F4Us for the 212th at Torokino airfield on Bougainville

Marine Fighter Attack Squadron 212 was activated as Marine Fighting Squadron 212 (VMF-212), the "Hell Hounds", at Marine Corps Air Station Ewa, Hawaii on 1 March 1942. Deploying in May to the South Pacific in their Grumman F4F Wildcats, the squadron was stationed at Tontouta on the island of New Caledonia, and later moved up to the Quoin Hill Airfield on the island of Efate. As preparations for the invasion of Guadalcanal increased, the squadron operated a detachment at Turtle Bay Airfield on Espiritu Santo until the arrival of VMO-251 ensured that the island was provided with adequate aerial defense. During the early part of the Guadalcanal campaign, VMF-212 sent detachments to operate with Cactus Air Force squadrons deployed to Henderson Field until the entire squadron was committed to the battle in mid-October.

On June 27, 1942, a Wildcat of the squadron attacked a Royal Australian Air Force Catalina flying boat of No. 11 Squadron, having mistaken it for a Japanese aircraft. This led to the RAAF removing the red dot from the center of its roundel for the duration of the war in the Pacific in order to prevent confusion with the all-red hinomaru used as a roundel by Japanese aircraft.

The squadron acquired an enviable record by destroying 64½ enemy planes including that of Toshio Ohta, a Japanese ace. Of this number, LtCol Harold "Indian Joe" Bauer, the squadron's first Commanding Officer, was credited with 11 kills and posthumously awarded the Medal of Honor for his valor.

The squadron returned to the United States in November 1942 and remained on the West Coast until June 1943 when they sailed for Midway Atoll. The squadron remained on Midway for two months and then returned to Espiritu Santo. By August 1943, VMF-212 was back in the Solomon Islands where they participated in the campaigns to retake Vella Lavella and Bougainville. From 20 October through 27 November 1943 the squadron was based out of Barakoma Airfield and supported operations in the Treasury Islands, Choiseul and Bougainville. By December 1943 they moved to Torokina Airfield and remained there until they moved again on 20 January 1944 this time to Piva Airfield. Another move came on 20 March when they transited to Green Island and later back to Vella Lavella. VMF-212 remained in the vicinity of the Solomons and Bismarck Islands for the remainder of 1944 running fighter sweeps against the Japanese garrison on Rabaul and providing close air support for ground forces on Bougainville. On 8 January 1945, VMF-212 landed on Samar and provided close air support for United States Army troops during the campaign to retake the Philippines. During this time they flew over Mindoro, Luzon, Visayas and Mindanao. It was also during this time that the squadron was a part of one of the worst aviation accidents of the war. At 09:40 on 24 January 1945, while taking off, 1Lt Karl Oerth of VMF-222 hit a lump in the runway, blew a tire and his Corsair careened wildly into his own squadron's revetment area, which was shared with VMF-212. It completely wiped out the tents housing the intelligence, oxygen, parachutes and materiel departments. Many men attempted to rescue the pilot but while they were making this brave effort the plane exploded and set off all its .50 cal ammunition. 14 men were killed and over 50 wounded during this incident. In June 1945 the squadron arrived at Okinawa on the USS Hillsborough County (LST-827) and conducted operations from there until the end of the war. During the duration of World War II, VMF-212 was credited with shooting down 132½ enemy aircraft A Corsair which came to grief on Approach to Quoin Hill Airfield on Efate, Vanuatu is now a great dive attraction.

=== Korean War ===
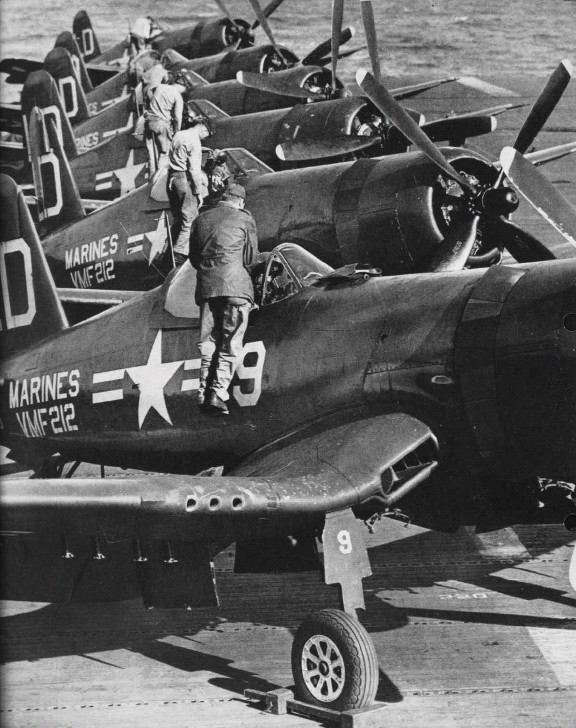
VMF-212 F4U-4s on USS Rendova in 1951

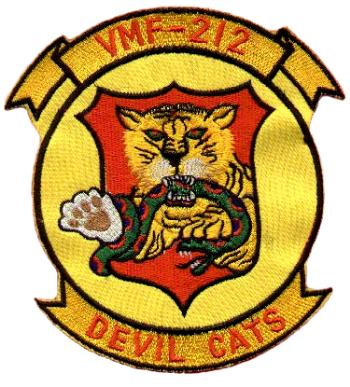
Squadron logo during the Korean War

VMF-212, with no nickname since its reactivation in 1946, was one of the first squadrons sent to Far East at the outbreak of the war. They remained in Japan until Marines were able to capture Kimpo Airfield after the Battle of Inchon. The squadron finally touched down in Korea on 18 September 1950 and were flying their first Corsair F4U-4 strikes by 20 September. The squadron was later moved to Wonson, North Korea late October 1951 than onto Yonpo Airfield in North Korea as the United Nations' forces continued their advance in the early winter of 1950. The squadron adopted the name "Devil Cats" and a new patch was designed by Roy Irwin, depicting a Devil Cat clutching a Two-Step serpent in its mouth on a red shield. After the Chinese counterattack in late November 1950, VMF-212 aircraft flew almost continuous close air support missions supporting the 1st Marine Division as they fought their way out of encirclement during the Battle of Chosin Reservoir while being stationed afloat aboard the USS Bataan (CVL-29). The squadron operated from the USS Bataan until 5 March 1951.

VMF-212 moved to being land based at K3 Pohang, South Korea. A Grumman F9F Panther BuNo 123520 belonging to VMF-212 was destroyed by fire from other aircraft at K-3 in Korea July 30, 1951. The squadron left Korea in the spring or summer of 1951 and returned to Cherry Point NC. Those personnel who had extended enlistments transferred to VMF 214 at another Korean base. VMA-212's F4U Corsairs were replaced by upgraded AU-1 Corsairs in 1952. The AU-1 Corsair had armor plate around the cockpit and the oil coolers that were moved up to behind the engine. The squadron dropped more ordnance during the Korean War than any other Marine Corps squadron. The AU-1 Corsair had an additional center bomb rack which carried a 2,000 lb (910 kg) bomb until the rough Marston Matting, which was laid over the old pock-marked Japanese landing strip at K-6, caused the center bomb rack to break off. The AU-1 Corsair could carry a 2,000 lb (910 kg) bomb on its center rack, two 1,000 lb (450 kg) bombs on the wing root bomb racks and 100 or 260 lb (45 or 118 kg) bombs on its wing racks. It struggled up to enemy territory at approximately 140 knots (260 km/h; 160 mph). After releasing its bombs, the AU-l again became a fast fighter in close support of the front lines and a fighter capable of up to 600 knots (1,100 km/h; 690 mph) in a dive. Colonel Robert Galer, a Marine Corps Ace from World War II, was the Commanding Officer of MAG-12 in 1952, when he was shot down behind enemy lines and protected by VMF-212 pilots until rescued by a Marine Corps helicopter. VMF-212 lost ten pilots in Korea. On 9 June 1952, VMF-212 was re-designated VMA-212.

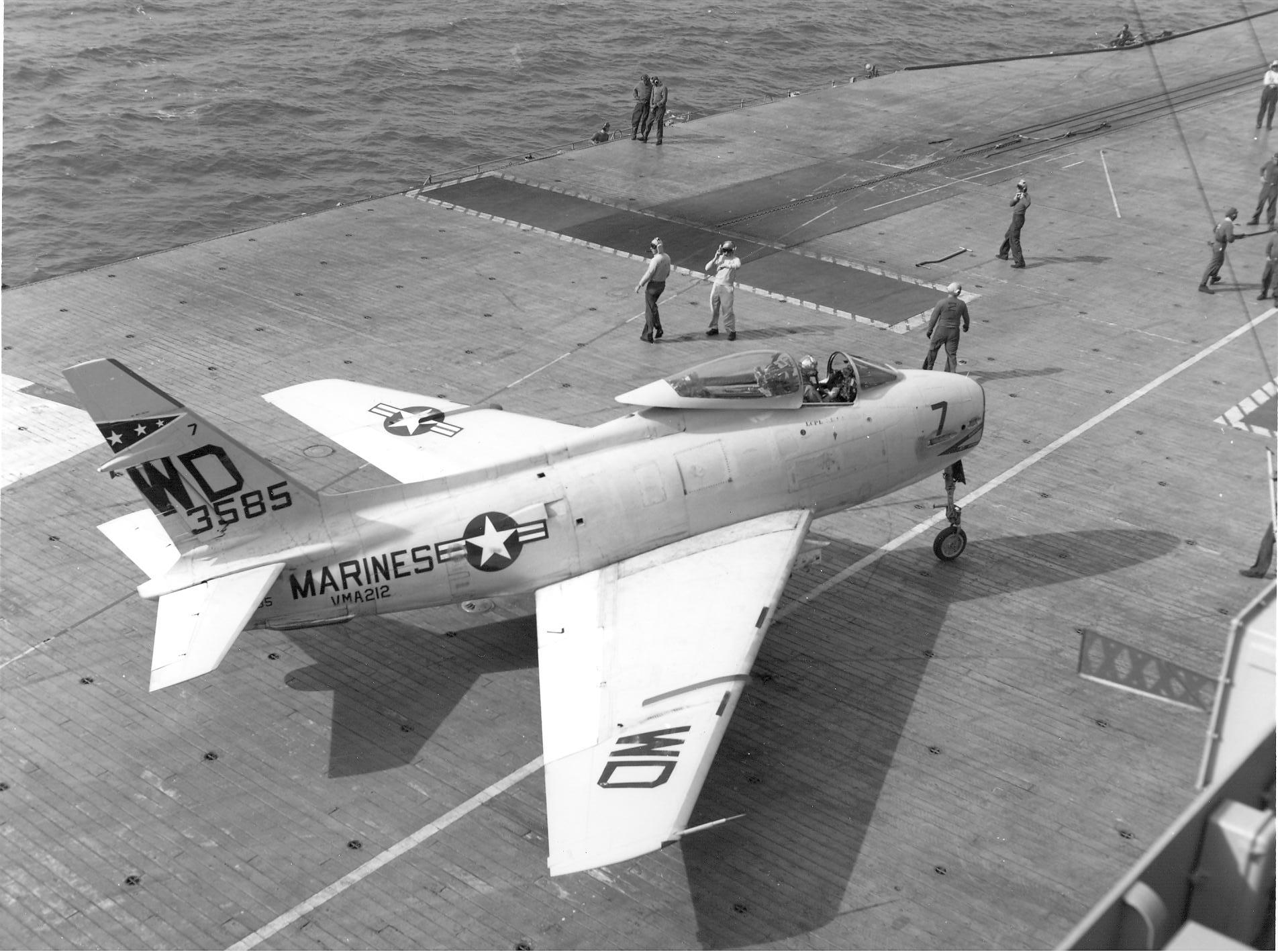
VMA-212 (WD) FJ-4B on USS Oriskany (CV-34) 1960

=== The 1950s and 1960s ===
After the cease fire in Korea, VMA-212 traded their AU-1 Corsairs for Douglas AD-2 and AD-3 Skyraiders. They boarded the USS Wasp in 1954, and joined MAG-13 at MCAS Kaneohe Bay, HI. They began a slow transition to white-and-gray paint schemes for their planes and sported a colorful flightline as the "blue birds" were phased out. The Devil Cats set a record for flight hours in May 1956, when their complement of fifty pilots kept its Skyraiders aloft for 4,276.2 hours for that month. The squadron accepted the WD tail code in August and transitioned to the jet age in March, 1958, with the North American FJ-4B Fury. The Devil Cats responded to the Quemoy-Matsu Crisis by prosecuting Operation Cannonball, in October 1958. VMA-212 and the Black Sheep of VMA-214 flew their aircraft across the Pacific, from Hawaii to Japan, utilizing their air-to-air refueling capability. This marked the first time that a single-seat aircraft had ever done so, and it stood in the record books until it was eclipsed by VMF(AW)-451 in 1961, when the Warlords flew their F8U Crusaders from El Toro to Japan. The Devil Cats traded their Fury jets for the Douglas A4D-2 Skyhawks (redesignated A-4B) in August 1961. The squadron received the Vought F-8B Crusader in July 1963 and changed their name to Lancers. Ed Rutty, the Executive Officer, derived that name in keeping with the medieval theme of the Crusader. David and Mary Lerps designed the Lancer insignia that was used for decades, featuring crossed lances over a cross-emblazened shield. The squadron was redesignated a Marine Fighter Squadron, VMF-212. The squadron operated the day-fighter version of the Crusader for exactly one year, when they accepted the F-8D Crusader and were redesignated Marine (All Weather) Fighter Squadron, VMF(AW)-212 on July 1, 1964.

=== The Vietnam War & the 1980s ===
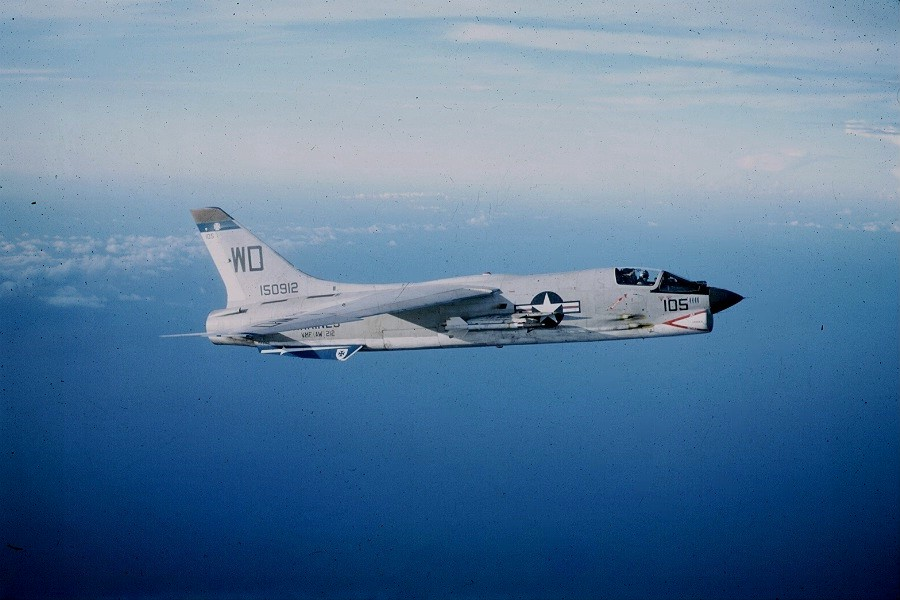
VMF(AW)-212 F-8E in 1965

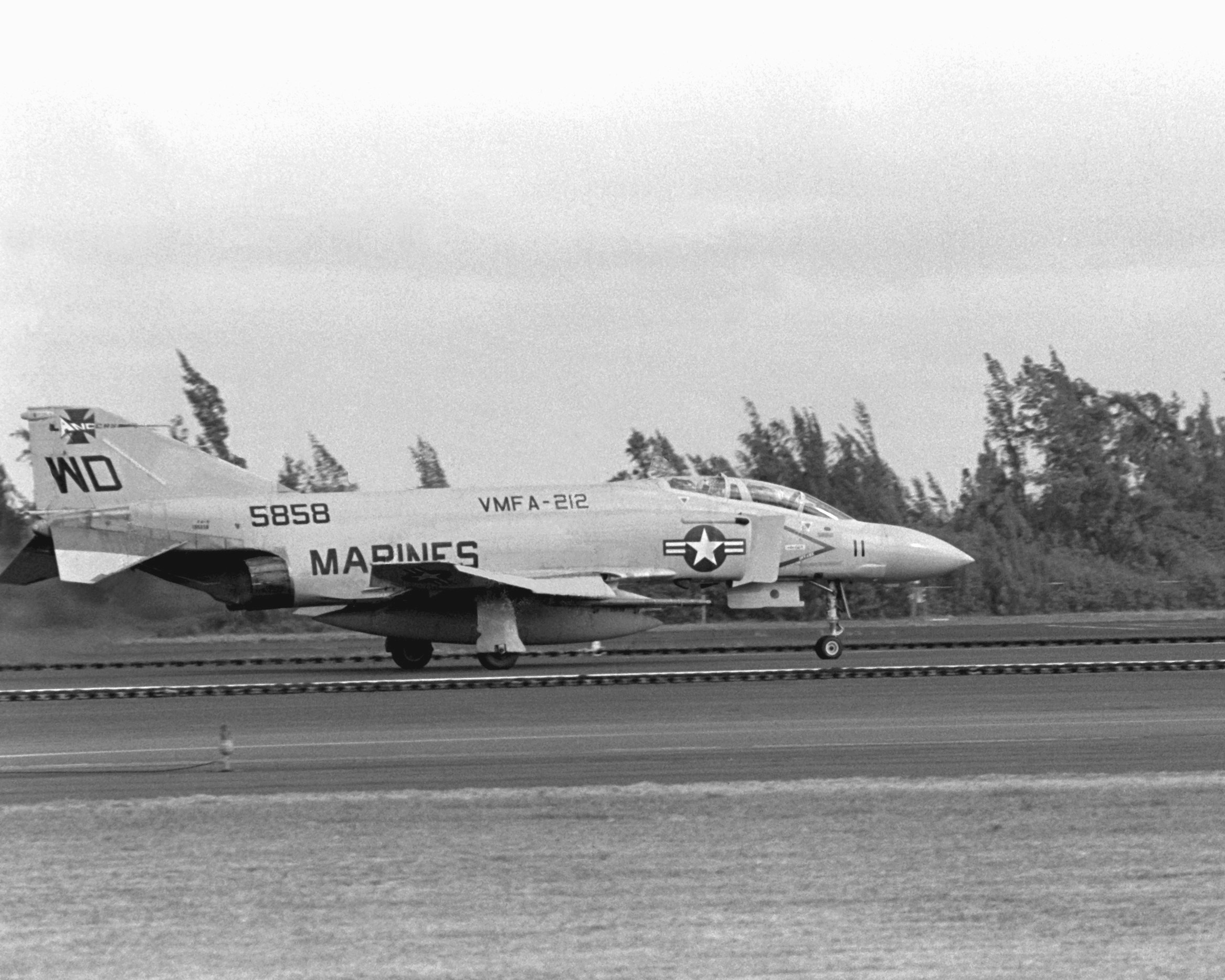
An F-4 Phantom II from VMFA-212 preparing to take-off at MCAS Kaneohe Bay in 1983.

The squadron was informed, in the Fall of 1964, that it would embark aboard the USS Oriskany for its 1965 WestPac cruise. The squadron immediately began carrier qualifications to sharpen their skills. Armed conflict in Vietnam was looming as a reality at the time and the squadron upgraded to the ground-attack version of the Crusader, the F-8E. They arrived at NAS San Diego in January and practiced air-to-ground ordnance delivery with their new Crusaders. Carrier Air Group 16 (CVW-16) they arrived off the coast of Vietnam and began operating from Yankee Station. From 8 May to 6 December 1965 the Lancers flew missions against targets in North and South Vietnam. The Operations Officer, Major Harry E. Sexton, devised a way to carry 2,000-pound MK-84 bombs from an F-8 Crusader prior to being launched from an aircraft carrier. Commander, Air Group (CAG) of CVW-16 Commander James Stockdale's A-4E Skyhawk was shot down September 9, over North Vietnam making the commanding officer of VMF(AW)-212 the acting CAG until a replacement arrived. This made 212's Commanding Officer LtCol Chuck Ludden the first Marine Officer to command a carrier airwing since William A. Millington did in World War II. Captain Harlan P. Chapman was shot down on November 5, over North Vietnam. He became a POW until he was released in February, 1973. Of interest, this incident was referred to in the motion picture, Top Gun as the date that the main character, Pete Mitchell's father was shot down. Later in the movie, Top Gun commander, Viper admits, "I flew with your old man. VF-51. The Oriskany." In December 1965 the squadron returned to Hawaii having flown 3,018 combat hours and 1,588 sorties during their time off the coast of Vietnam.

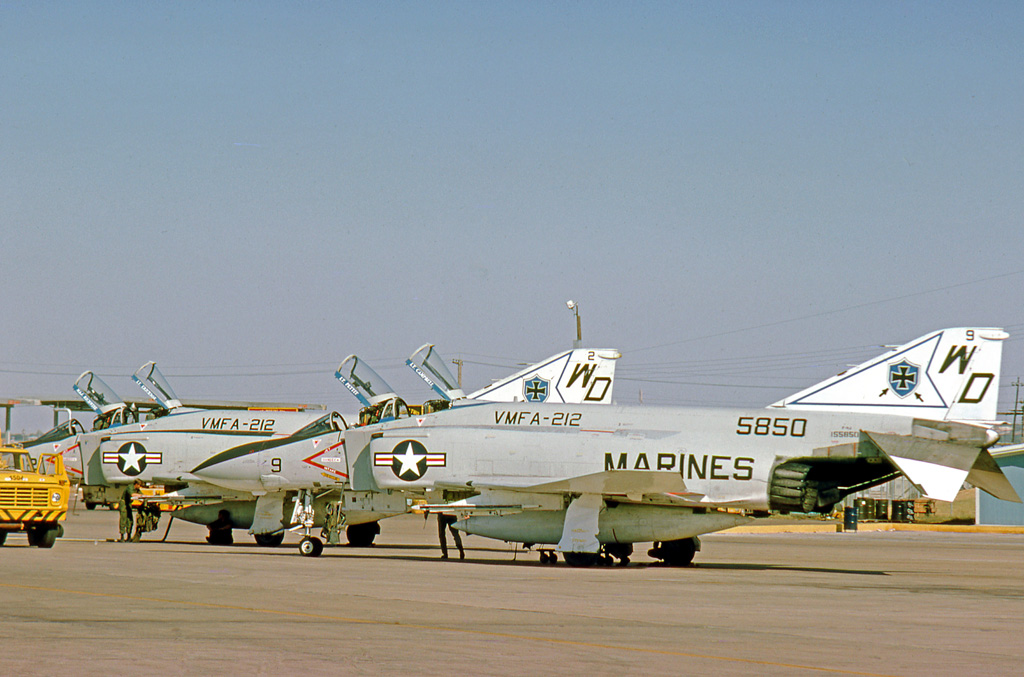
McDonnell F-4J Phantom II of VMFA-212 in 1975 wearing the units Lancers symbol on its fin

The squadron returned to MCAS Kaneohe Bay and resumed training with the F-8D. The unit reverted to the day-fighter version of the Crusader, the F-8B in early 1968 and lost its (all-weather) designation in March. VMF-212 received its first four McDonnell F-4J Phantom IIs in May 1968, but without the AWG-10 Pulse Doppler radar. Production of the radar was behind schedule for the production of the F-4J. The squadron was redesignated Marine Fixed/Wing Fighter Attack squadron, VMFA on August 10. The unit finally received radar-equipped birds in November 1969.

In April 1972, the squadron deployed from Hawaii to Da Nang Air Base, South Vietnam in an effort to blunt the massive North Vietnamese invasion of South Vietnam. LtCol Richard Revie led the Lancers across the Pacific joining VMFA-115 and VMFA-232 at Danang. The squadron began sorties immediately, attacking ground targets in the south. Danang Air Base was attacked by rockets two days after 212's arrival and two Lancers were injured on the flight line. Captain John W. Consolvo and his RIO, CWO3 James J. Castonguay were hit on May 7, after pulling off target near the northern Quang Tri Province. Consolvo fought to control the flaming Phantom but to no avail. He told his RIO to eject and Castonguay did. He did not see whether or not his pilot ejected. Castonguay hid from enemy patrols for nineteen hours before being rescued by helicopter. John Consolvo was listed as Missing In Action. The Lancers lost another Phantom and its crew on June 4, when Captain Benjamin Lee Tebault and 1LT Mike Konow were hit while diving on a target. The jet flew into the ground. The Marine Phantom units of Danang were ordered to Nam Phong, Thailand, but VMFA-212 was replaced by VMA(AW)-533 and the Lancers returned to Hawaii. VMFA-212 flew more than 1000 combat sorties during the two+ months they operated from Danang. VMFA-212 earned a Meritorious Unit Commendation for its effort in Vietnam.

From 1974 until 1987, VMFA-212 deployed numerous times to Japan and the West Coast earning the CNO Aviation Safety Award, the Robert M. Hanson Award, and the Meritorious Unit Commendation. During October 1987, VMFA-212 completed its seventh and final rotation in the UDP as an F-4 Phantom squadron. With the last F-4 sorties flown in August 1988, over 23,000 accident-free hours had been accumulated since the loss of an aircraft on March 27, 1978 at Midway Island. The F/A-18C Hornet was received at this time.

=== The Gulf War & the 1990s ===
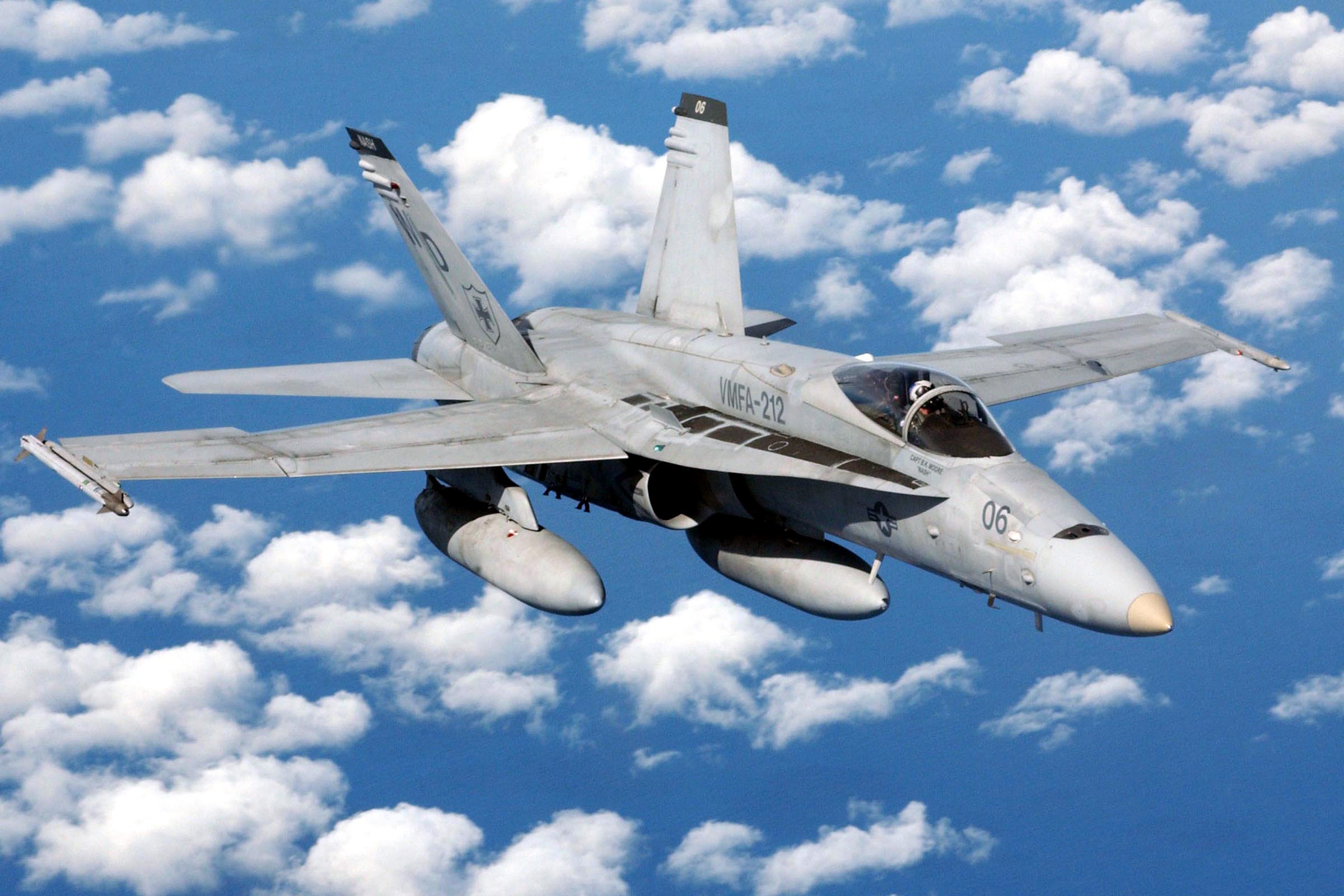
F/A-18 Hornet over the South China Sea

In December 1990, the squadron deployed to Bahrain in support of Operation Desert Shield. From there, they flew air interdiction and close air support missions in support of coalition forces during Operation Desert Storm after 17 January 1991. On 13 August 1996 the Lancers took off for the final time from NAS Miramar en route to MCAS Iwakuni, Japan. After a successful six-month cycle the Lancers became a permanent resident of MCAS Iwakuni.

=== The Global War on Terror ===
The Lancers were the second Marine Corps squadron to deploy after the September 11 attacks, following their aerial refueler aircraft from VMGR-152, the "Sumos." The squadron left MCAS Iwakuni on 14 September and after being refueled over Iwo Jima, began flying Combat Air Patrols over Guam in support of Operation Noble Eagle.

In the spring of 2002 the squadron deployed to Kuwait. For the first time single seat C models and 2-seat Ds from VMFA (AW)-332 "The Moonlighters" were combined into one unit. The Moon-Lancers flew missions over Iraq in support of Operation Southern Watch and Afghanistan in support of Operation Enduring Freedom. The OEF missions were, on average, 10 hours in duration and mostly at night.

Due to a re-organization within Marine aviation, the squadron was decommissioned in 2008 in order to facilitate the Corps' transition to the F-35.

== Squadron aces ==
The following members of VMF-212 were credited with shooting down at least five Japanese aircraft and earned the right to be called an Ace. The numbers after their name represents the number of enemy aircraft they were credited with shooting down.

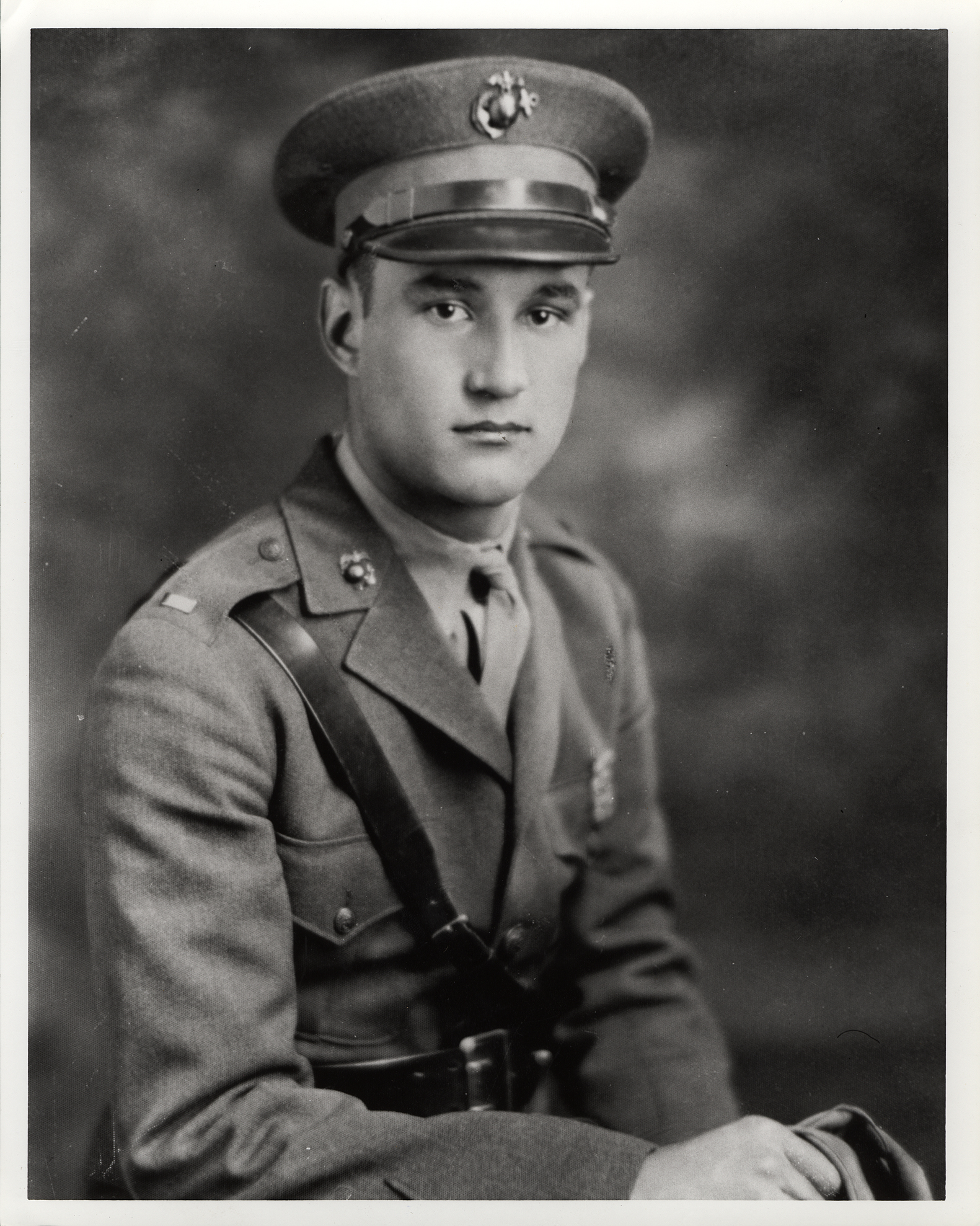
LtCol Harold Bauer was awarded the Medal of Honor while serving with VMF-212 in World War II

- Harold W. Bauer – 11.0
- William A. Carlton – 5.0
- Jack E. Conger – 10.0
- Phillip C. DeLong – 11.2
- Frank C. Drury – 6.0
- Hugh M. Elwood – 5.2
- Loren D. Everton – 12.0
- Henry B. Hamilton – 7.0
- John McManus – 6.0
- Donald C. Owen – 5.0
- Frederick R. Payne Jr. – 7.5
- Francis E. Pierce Jr. – 6.0
- George H. Poske – 5.0
- Robert F. Stout – 6.0.

== MIA information ==
In May 2008, a team from the Joint POW/MIA Accounting Command found the wreckage of an F4U Corsair (BuNo 55908) and the remains of 1stLt Allan S. Harrison III in the vicinity of Warangoi, Papua New Guinea. 1stLt Harrison was shot down by a Japanese aircraft on 11 February 1944 while taking part in a raid on the Japanese garrison at Rabaul.

== See also ==
- United States Marine Corps Aviation
- List of active United States Marine Corps aircraft squadrons
- List of decommissioned United States Marine Corps aircraft squadrons
