= USS Hillsborough County =

1944 LST-542-class tank landing ship

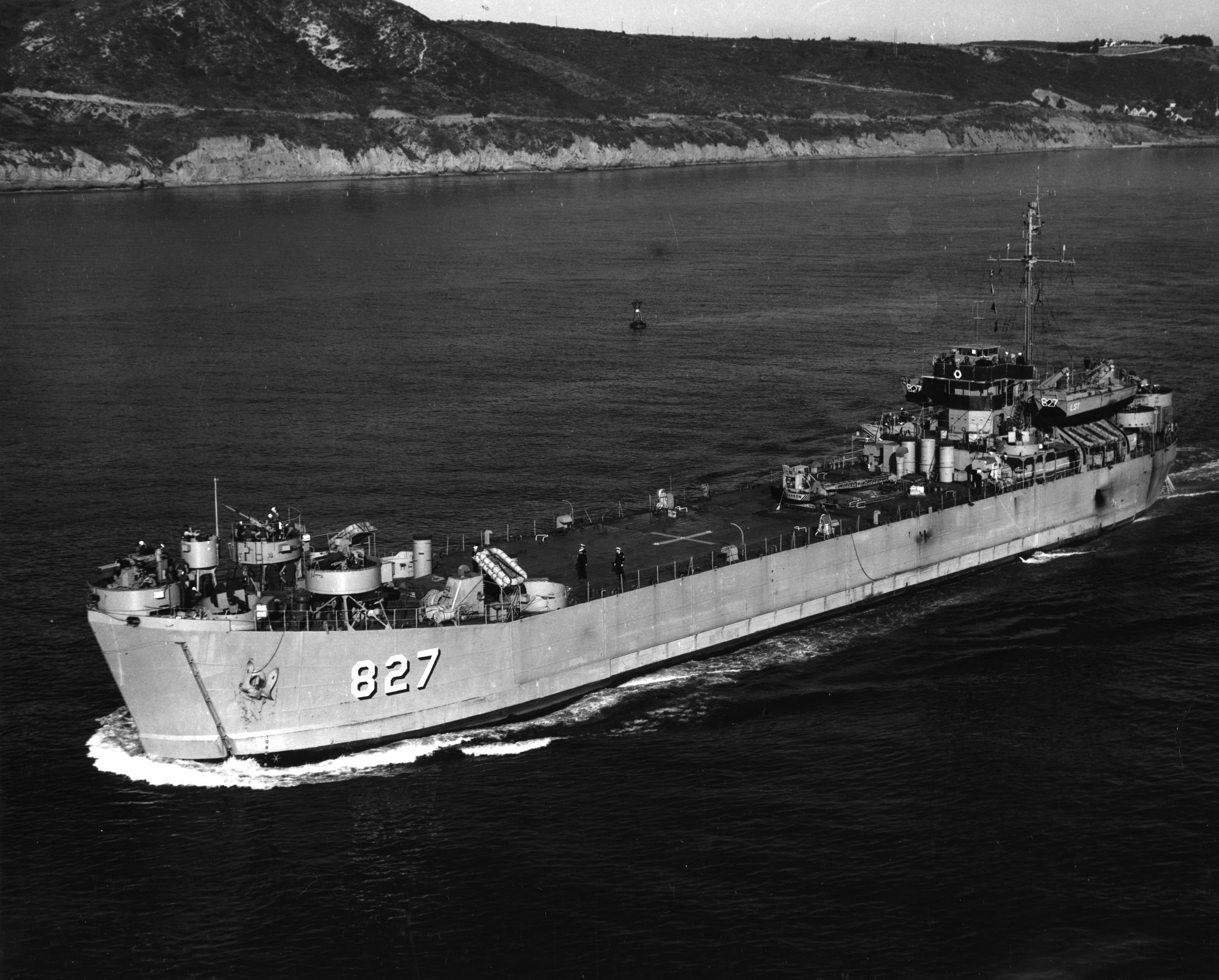

History

United States
- Name: USS LST-827
- Builder: Missouri Valley Bridge & Iron Company, Evansville, Indiana
- Laid down: 13 October 1944
- Launched: 22 November 1944
- Commissioned: 12 December 1944
- Decommissioned: 7 June 1949
- Recommissioned: 3 November 1950
- Decommissioned: 28 January 1958
- Renamed: USS Hillsborough County (LST-827), 1 July 1955
- Stricken: 28 March 1958
- Honors and awards: 1 battle star (World War II); 3 battle stars (Korea)
- Fate: Sunk as a target ship, 15 August 1958

General characteristics
- Class & type: LST-542-class tank landing ship
- Displacement: 1,625 long tons (1,651 t) light; 3,640 long tons (3,698 t) full
- Length: 328 ft (100 m)
- Beam: 50 ft (15 m)
- Draft: Unloaded : 2 ft 4 in (0.71 m) forward; 7 ft 6 in (2.29 m) aft; Loaded : 8 ft 2 in (2.49 m) forward; 14 ft 1 in (4.29 m) aft
- Propulsion: 2 × General Motors 12-567 diesel engines, two shafts, twin rudders
- Speed: 12 knots (22 km/h; 14 mph)
- Boats & landing craft carried: Two LCVPs
- Troops: approx. 130 officers and enlisted men
- Complement: 8–10 officers, 89–100 enlisted men
- Armament: 1 × single 3-inch/50-caliber gun mount; 8 × 40 mm guns; 12 × 20 mm guns

USS Hillsborough County (LST-827) was an LST-542-class tank landing ship built for the United States Navy during World War II. Named after Hillsborough County, Florida, she was the only U.S. Naval vessel to bear the name.

Originally laid down as USS LST-827 by the Missouri Valley Bridge & Iron Company of Evansville, Indiana on 13 October 1944; launched 22 November; sponsored by Mrs. Clark H. Woodward; and commissioned 12 December.

== Service history ==
=== World War II, 1945 ===
After shakedown off Florida, LST-827 loaded smoke-pots on her tank deck, then departed Mobile, Alabama on 17 January 1945. Following brief stops at the Panama Canal Zone and Pearl Harbor, she arrived at Eniwetok early in March. Sailing for Guam on the 13th, she unloaded her cargo, and for the next two months transported men and equipment between the Marianas and the Philippines. After embarking Marine Fighting Squadron 212 (VMF-212) of Marine Air Group 14 (MAG-14), LST-827 departed San Pedro Bay, Philippines on 24 May en route to Okinawa. When she arrived five days later, American forces were already engaged in a two-month campaign to push the enemy from its Pacific stronghold. After unloading men and equipment, she steamed to the Philippines for additional reinforcements. For the remainder of World War II, LST-827 operated in the vicinity of Okinawa and the Philippines, transporting men and supplies for the final drive to the enemy's homeland.

=== Post-war operations, 1946–1949 ===
Following the Japanese surrender, the landing ship serviced the occupation forces in the Far East until she sailed for the United States on 15 November, arriving San Diego on 16 December. Joining LST Squadron 1 there in May, 1946 she operated along the West Coast performing fleet maneuvers and tactical training exercises for the next three years. LST-827 decommissioned 7 June 1949 at San Diego and joined the Pacific Reserve Fleet. Her respite was brief, however, as President Harry S. Truman met the communist challenge of aggression in Asia by sending U.S. forces to aid the beleaguered South Koreans.

=== Korean War, 1950–1952 ===
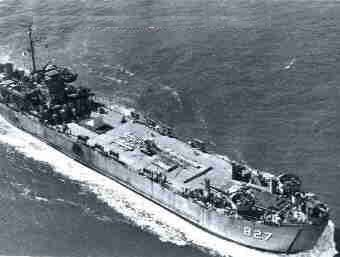
LST-827, returning to the U.S. from Korea, 1951

Recommissioned on 3 November 1950, LST-827 departed San Diego on 27 January 1951 for the Far East. After a brief stop at Pearl Harbor, she arrived Yokosuka on 3 March. Assigned to the Korean supply run, she carried supplies from Japan to Pusan, Ulsan, and Inchon for the next four months. LST-827 returned to the United States on 9 August to operate there until early 1952. Departing San Diego on 17 February, she steamed for her second tour in the Western Pacific, touching Pearl Harbor, the Marshall Islands, and the Philippines before arriving Yokosuka on 26 April. From May to October she shuttled supplies and troops between Japan and Korea to strengthen the Allied forces against the threat of Communism.

=== 1952–1958 ===
Departing Japan on 10 October 1952, LST-827 was to perform another historic service to her country by operating with the units assigned to Ivy Mike – the first hydrogen bomb tests. She returned to San Diego on 30 November and received major alterations at Mare Island Naval Shipyard in preparation for her next assignment. From 1953 through 1956, LST-827 sailed on two WestPac cruises, engaged in amphibious exercises off the West Coast and steamed to the Arctic on three occasions to supply stations on the DEW line radar network.

This vessel has an appearance in the film The Bridges at Toko-Ri (released in 1954) from which flies a rescue helicopter to assist the protagonist (William Holden) after an emergency landing with his Grumman F9F Panther jet fighter.

On 1 July 1955, all remaining active LSTs were given names of U.S. counties; LST-827 was named USS Hillsborough County (LST-827). During 1957 she participated in exercises off the California coast, and on 1 November was placed in commission, in reserve. Hillsborough County decommissioned on 28 January 1958. Struck from the Naval Vessel Register on 28 March 1958, she was then used as a target and sunk in the Gulf of California on 15 August 1958.

LST-827 received one battle star for World War II service and three stars for the Korean War.
