= USS Rendova =

Commencement Bay-class escort carrier of the US Navy

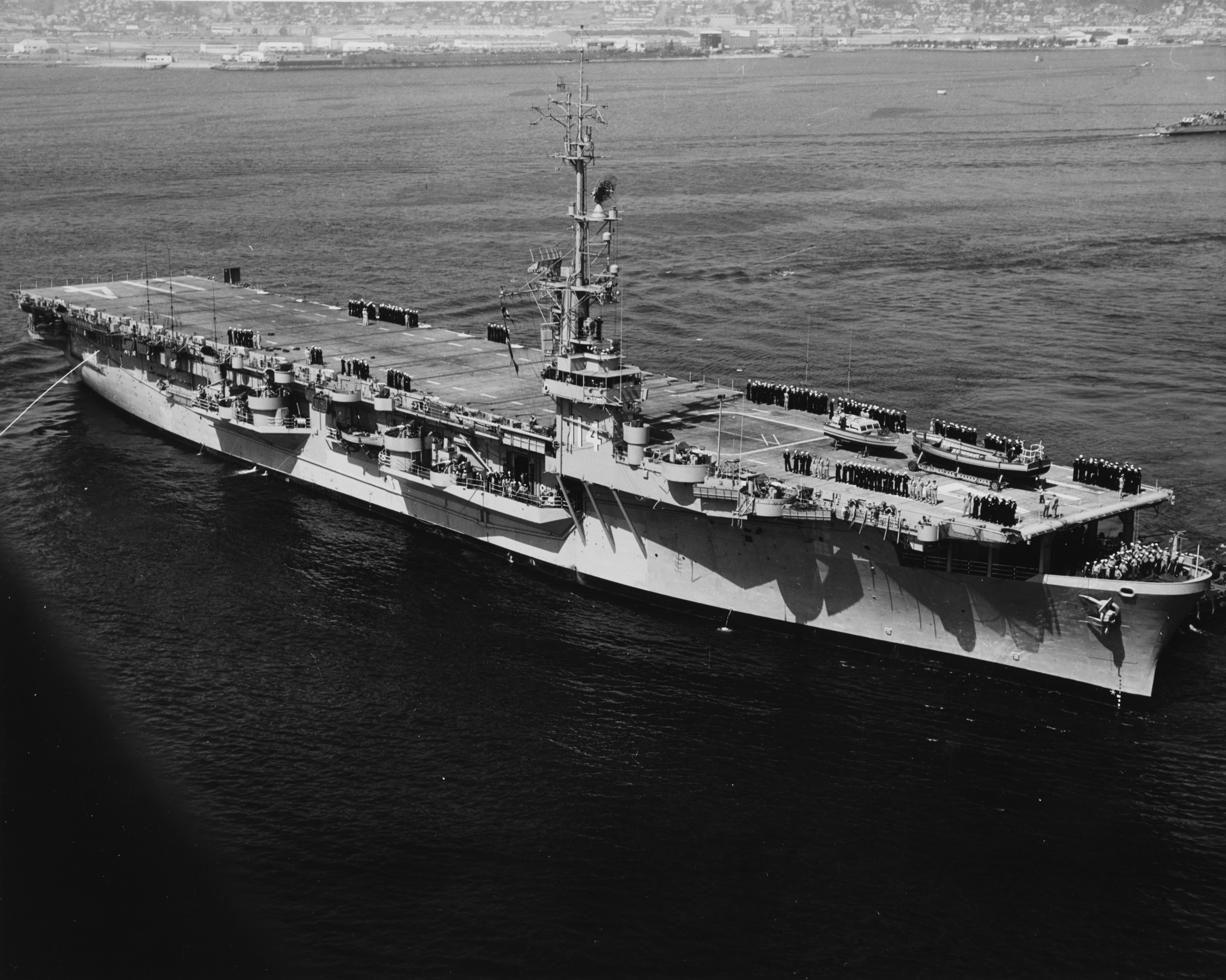
- USS Rendova (CVE-114) circa 1953

History

United States
- Name: USS Rendova
- Builder: Todd-Pacific Shipyards
- Laid down: 15 June 1944
- Launched: 29 December 1944
- Commissioned: 22 October 1945
- Decommissioned: 27 January 1950
- Recommissioned: 3 January 1951
- Decommissioned: 30 June 1955
- Reclassified: Cargo Ship and Aircraft Ferry, AKV-14, 1959
- Stricken: 1 April 1971
- Home port: San Diego
- Fate: Sold for scrap, late 1971

General characteristics
- Class & type: Commencement Bay-class escort carrier
- Displacement: 21,397 long tons (21,740 t)
- Length: 557 ft 1 in (169.80 m) loa
- Beam: 75 ft (23 m)
- Draft: 32 ft (9.8 m)
- Installed power: 16,000 shp (12,000 kW); 4 × boilers
- Propulsion: 2 × Steam turbines; 2 × screw propellers
- Speed: 19 knots (35 km/h; 22 mph)
- Complement: 1,066
- Armament: 2 × 5 in (127 mm) dual-purpose guns; 36 × 40 mm (1.6 in) Bofors AA guns; 20 × 20 mm (0.8 in) Oerlikon AA guns
- Aircraft carried: 33
- Aviation facilities: 2 × aircraft catapults

USS Rendova was a Commencement Bay-class escort carrier of the United States Navy. The Commencement Bay class were built during World War II, and were an improvement over the earlier Sangamon class, which were converted from oil tankers. They were capable of carrying an air group of 33 planes and were armed with an anti-aircraft battery of 5 in (127 mm), 40 mm (1.6 in), and 20 mm (0.8 in) guns. The ships were capable of a top speed of 19 knots (35 km/h; 22 mph), and due to their origin as tankers, had extensive fuel storage.

She was originally assigned the name Mosser Bay. she was laid down by Todd-Pacific Shipyards, Inc., Tacoma, Washington, 15 June 1944; launched 29 December 1944; sponsored by Mrs. Anna-Marie H. Kurtz; and commissioned 22 October 1945, Capt. R. W. Ruble in command. She was completed at Willamette Iron and Steel Works.

== Design ==
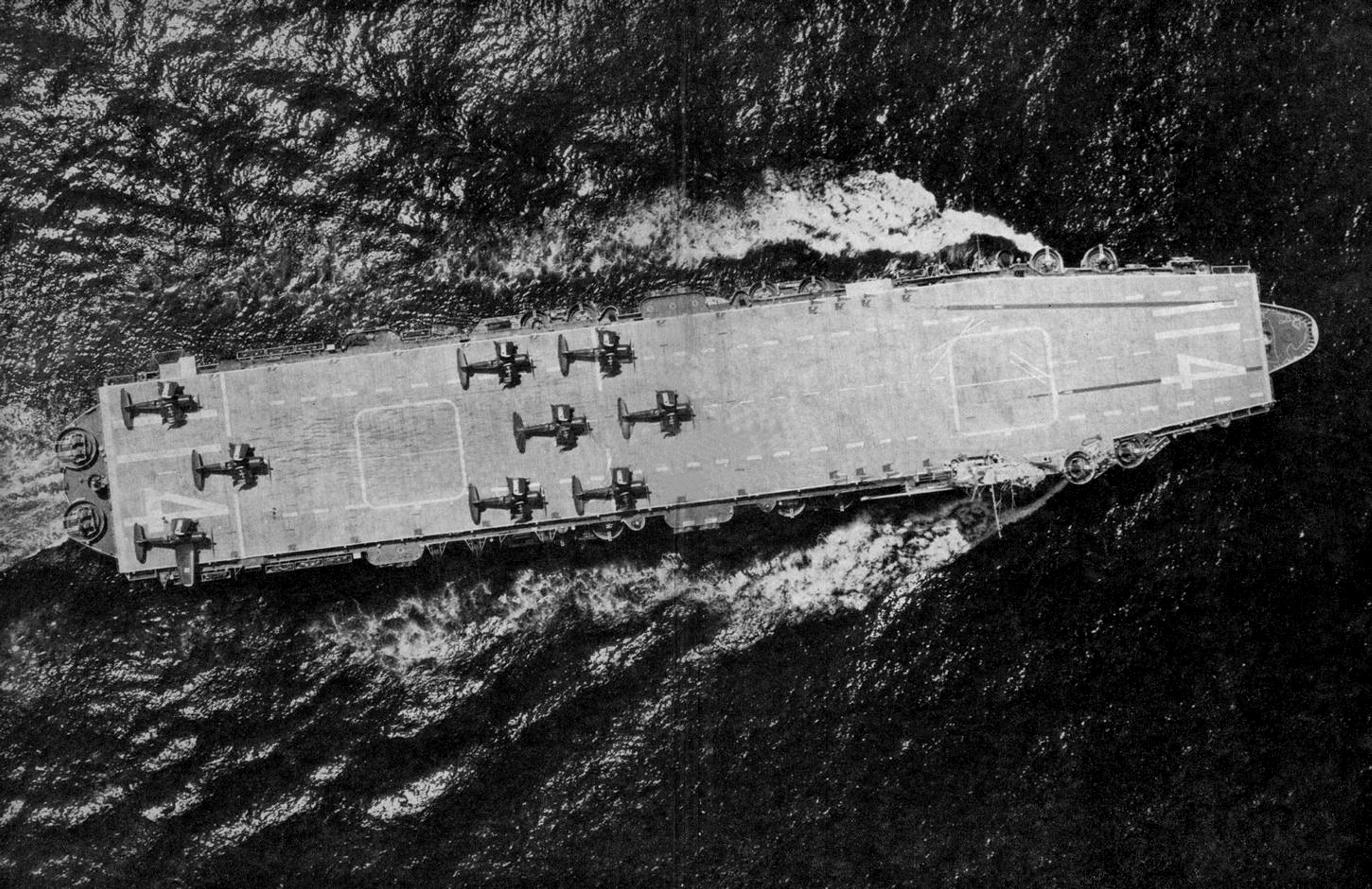
Overhead view of Rendova in 1952

In 1941, as United States participation in World War II became increasingly likely, the US Navy embarked on a construction program for escort carriers, which were converted from transport ships of various types. Many of the escort carrier types were converted from C3-type transports, but the Sangamon-class escort carriers were instead rebuilt oil tankers. These proved to be very successful ships, and the Commencement Bay class, authorized for Fiscal Year 1944, were an improved version of the Sangamon design. The new ships were faster, had improved aviation facilities, and had better internal compartmentation. They proved to be the most successful of the escort carriers, and the only class to be retained in active service after the war, since they were large enough to operate newer aircraft.

Rendova was 557 ft 1 in (169.80 m) long overall, with a beam of 75 ft (23 m) at the waterline, which extended to 105 ft 2 in (32.05 m) at maximum. She displaced 21,397 long tons (21,740 t) at full load, of which 12,876 long tons (13,083 t) could be fuel oil (though some of her storage tanks were converted to permanently store seawater for ballast), and at full load she had a draft of 27 ft 11 in (8.51 m). The ship's superstructure consisted of a small island. She had a complement of 1,066 officers and enlisted men.

The ship was powered by two Allis-Chalmers geared steam turbines, each driving one screw propeller, using steam provided by four Combustion Engineering-manufactured water-tube boilers. The propulsion system was rated to produce a total of 16,000 shp (12,000 kW) for a top speed of 19 knots (35 km/h; 22 mph). Given the very large storage capacity for oil, the ships of the Commencement Bay class could steam for some 23,900 nautical miles (44,300 km; 27,500 mi) at a speed of 15 knots (28 km/h; 17 mph).

Her defensive anti-aircraft armament consisted of two 5 in (127 mm) dual-purpose guns in single mounts, thirty-six 40 mm (2 in) Bofors guns, and twenty 20 mm (1 in) Oerlikon light AA cannons. The Bofors guns were placed in three quadruple and twelve twin mounts, while the Oerlikon guns were all mounted individually. She carried 33 planes, which could be launched from two aircraft catapults. Two elevators transferred aircraft from the hangar to the flight deck.

== Service history ==
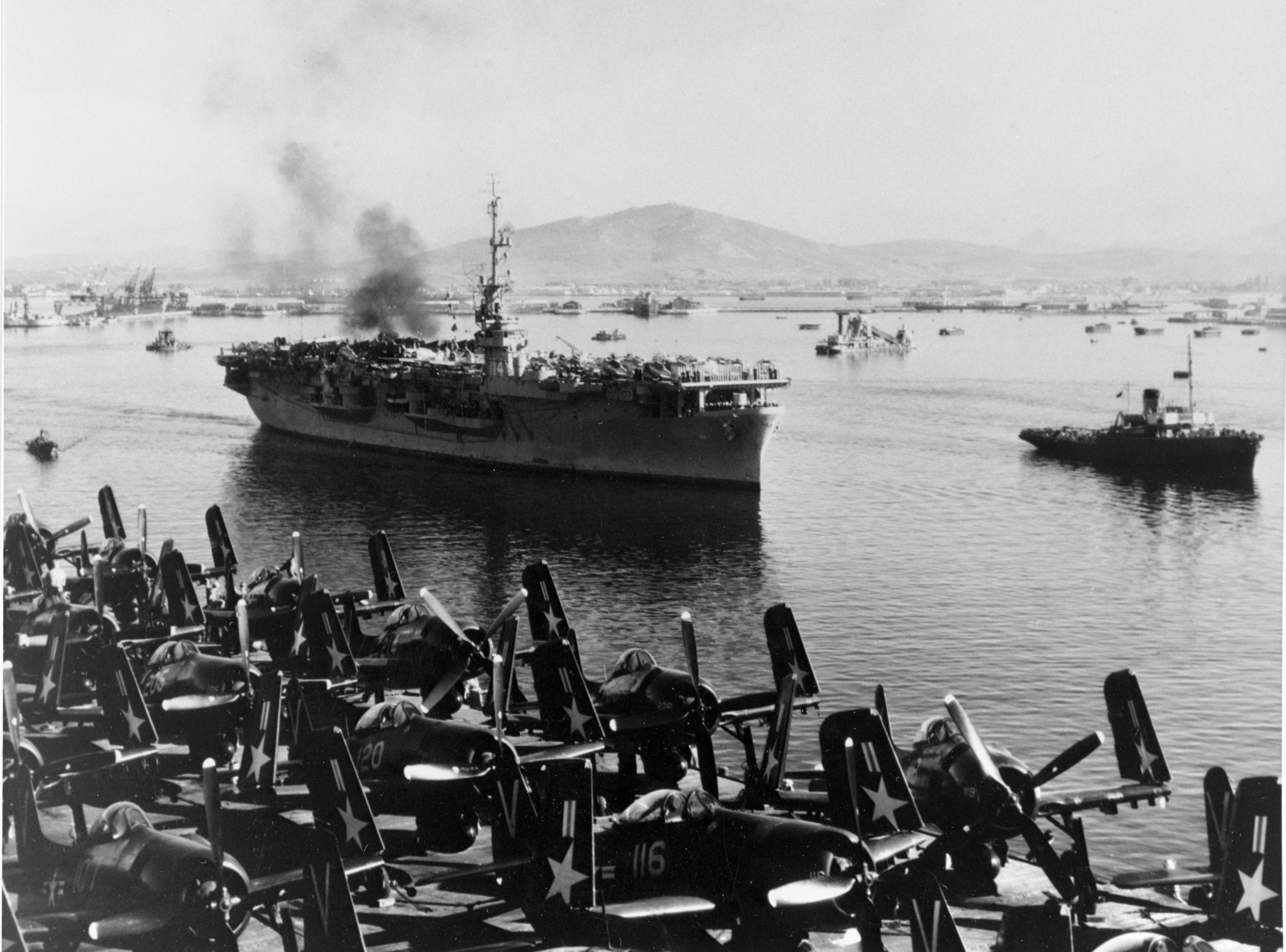
Rendova stopping in Gibraltar on her way to Turkey in 1948

The ship, originally named Mosser Bay, was ordered on 23 January 1943, and on 6 November, before work had begun, she was renamed Rendova after the landings on Rendova that occurred earlier that year. She was laid down at the Todd-Pacific Shipyards in Tacoma, Washington, on 15 June 1944 and was launched on 28 or 29 December. She was commissioned on 22 October 1945, by which time World War II had already ended. The ship completed her shakedown cruise in January 1946 before being assigned to First Fleet the following month. She took part in training exercises off the West Coast of the United States in March, but as the Navy was drawing down its force levels after the war, Rendova was removed from active service with only a skeleton crew to maintain her. She remained laid up in San Diego, California, for the next year, during which time she served as a headquarters ship for Carrier Division 15.

Rendova was reactivated in early 1947, and she spent the rest of the year participating in training maneuvers held off the West Coast and in the Hawaii area. She was used as an aircraft transport in 1948, departing from San Francisco on 1 April with a cargo of North American T-6 Texan trainers, bound for Turkey. She arrived in Yesilkoy on 28 April and unloaded the aircraft before departing to return home on 4 May. She passed through the Suez Canal and then transited the Indian and Pacific Oceans on the way home, stopping in many foreign ports on the way to make goodwill visits. She reached San Diego on 1 July. Her stay there was brief, as she got underway again on 28 July, this time to China. She stopped in Qingdao from 23 to 27 August and then returned to San Diego by the end of September. She spent the rest of the year training off the California coast.

The ship made another voyage to Chinese waters in early 1949, visiting Qingdao once again. She patrolled between that port and Okinawa, Japan, until mid-April, when she departed to return to California. After arriving, she rejoined First Fleet and took part in training exercises for much of the rest of the year. She sailed to Bremerton, Washington, in October, for an overhaul in preparation to being decommissioned on 27 January 1950. She was then assigned to the Pacific Reserve Fleet.

=== Korean war ===
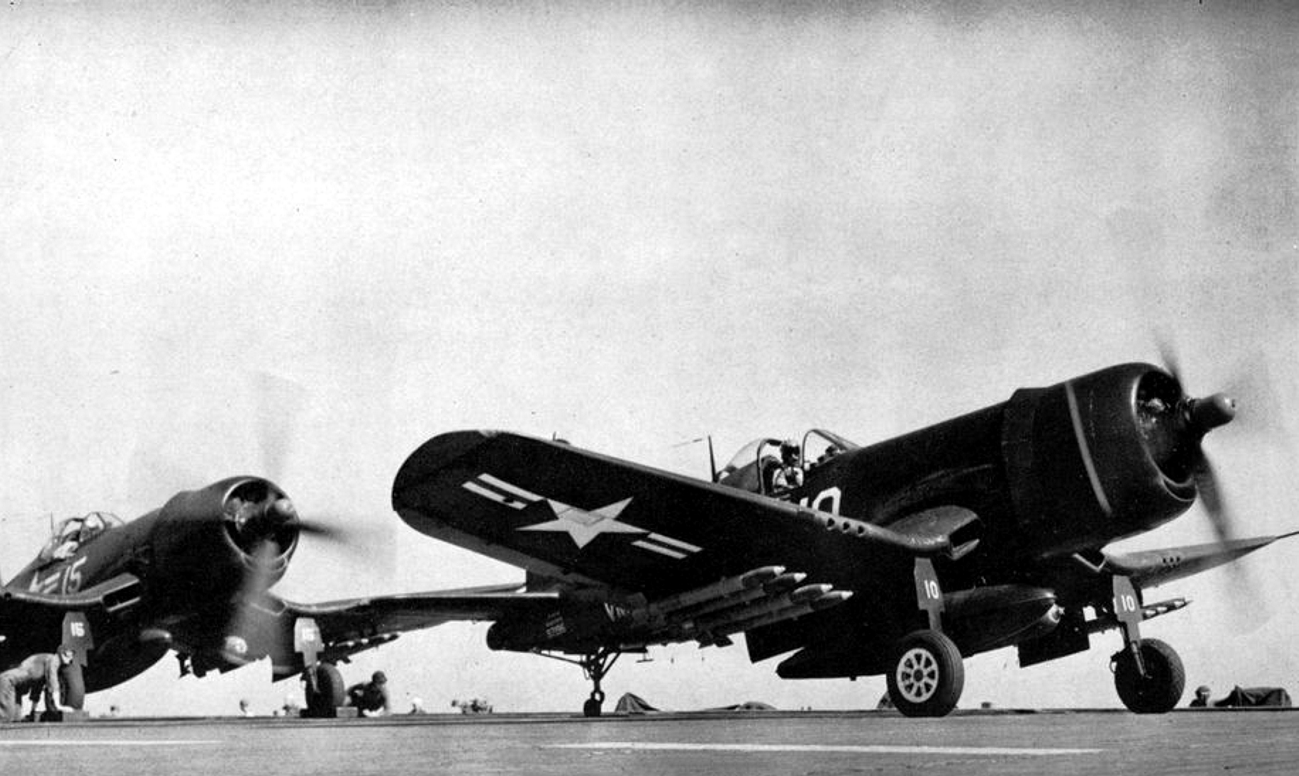
A Vought F4U Corsair of VMF-212 aboard Rendova, 1951

Following the North Korean invasion of South Korea in June 1950, which initiated the Korean War, Rendova was recommissioned on 3 January 1951. The ship was operational by April, and on 3 July, she departed for East Asia. She arrived in Yokosuka, Japan, on 2 August and then sailed south to Okinawa for combat training. She then sailed back to mainland Japan in September, arriving in Kobe on the 20th. There, she replaced her sister ship Sicily as the carrier for Task Group 95.1. On 22 September, she embarked Marine squadron VMF-212, which was equipped with Vought F4U Corsair fighters. The following day, she carried out carrier training for the pilots, and then loaded ammunition and supplies at Sasebo, Japan on the 24th. She departed Japan on 25 September for her operational area in the Yellow Sea.

After arriving on station, she relieved the British aircraft carrier HMS Glory and began combat operations off the western coast of Korea on 26 September. Her aircraft supported American and South Korean ground forces fighting ashore, flew search and rescue missions, assisted enforcing a blockade of North Korean ports, and performed reconnaissance flights over enemy positions. Over the course of the next two months, her aircraft flew a total of 1,743 sorties, and on 17 November, the pilots of VMF-212 established a one-day record for escort carriers of 64 individual sorties. Throughout this period, she alternated with the Australian aircraft carrier HMAS Sydney. Rendova completed her combat tour on 6 December, departing to return to the United States soon thereafter. The ship earned two battle stars for her service during the war.

=== Later career ===
Rendova arrived in San Diego on 22 December, remaining there into January 1952. She thereafter re-joined First Fleet for training exercises for much of the rest of the year. She left the United States in September to participate in Operation Ivy, a series of two nuclear weapons tests in the Marshall Islands. Following the experiments, she returned to California, where she was placed in reserve, but still in commission, in 1953. Later that year, she took part in training exercises off the coast of California. She returned to full commission in 1954 for another cruise in the western Pacific. She served as a hunter-killer anti-submarine carrier during the voyage. By mid-June, she had returned to California, and she spent the next several months taking part in maneuvers off Long Beach, California. In October, she moved to Mare Island Naval Shipyard to be deactivated again. By this time, the Navy had begun replacing the Commencement Bay-class ships with much larger Essex-class aircraft carriers, since the former were too small to operate newer and more effective anti-submarine patrol planes. Proposals to radically rebuild the Commencement Bays either with an angled flight deck and various structural improvements or lengthen their hulls by 30 ft (9.1 m) and replace their propulsion machinery to increase speed came to nothing, as they were deemed to be too expensive. Assigned again to the Pacific Reserve Fleet on 2 February 1955, Rendova was allocated to the San Francisco Group and was decommissioned there on 30 June. The ship was reclassified as an aircraft ferry and cargo ship, with the hull number AKV-14 in 1959. Rendova saw no further activity, however, and on 1 April 1971, she was struck from the Naval Vessel Register. She was eventually sold to ship breakers on 12 December 1972.
