= Harold W. Bauer =

United States Marine Corps Medal of Honor recipient (1908–1942)

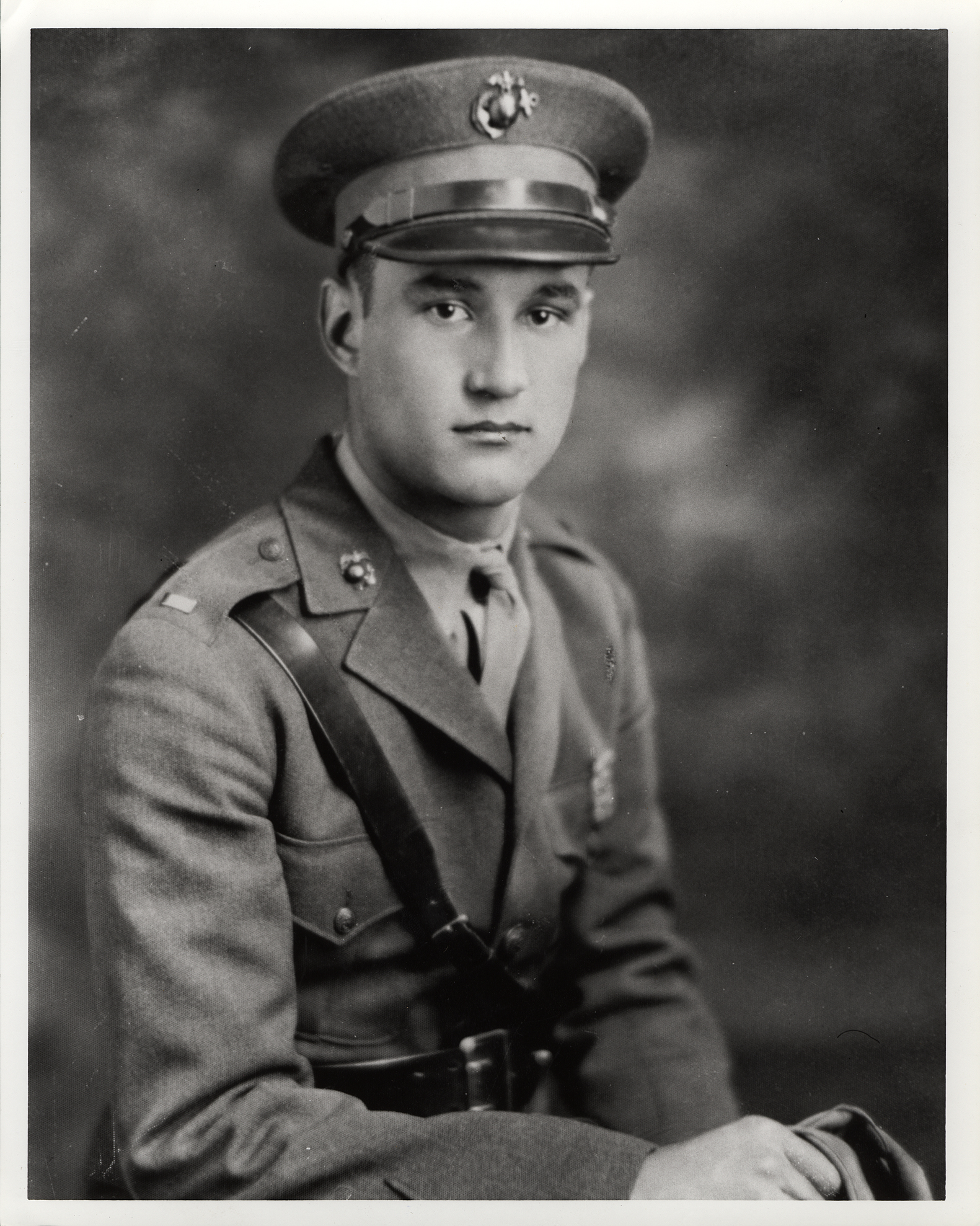
- Lieutenant Harold W. Bauer in the early 1930s
- Born: Harold William Bauer; November 20, 1908; Woodruff, Kansas, United States
- Died: November 14, 1942 (aged 33); Near Guadalcanal, Solomon Islands
- Burial place: remains not recovered. Memorialized on the Walls of the Missing, Manila American Cemetery
- Military career
- Allegiance: United States of America
- Branch: United States Marine Corps
- Service years: 1926–1942
- Rank: Lieutenant colonel
- Nicknames: "Indian Joe", "Coach"
- Commands: Marine Fighter Squadron 212
- Conflicts: World War II: Battle of Guadalcanal †
- Awards: Medal of Honor; Purple Heart

Harold William "Joe" Bauer (November 20, 1908 – November 14, 1942) was a United States Marine Corps air group commander, fighter pilot and flying ace credited with destroying 11 Japanese aircraft during World War II. He was posthumously awarded the Medal of Honor for his actions as a fighter squadron commander during the crucial struggle for the control of the Solomon Islands at the Battle of Guadalcanal.

== Early years ==
Harold William Bauer was born on November 20, 1908, in Woodruff, Kansas, and grew up in North Platte, Nebraska. He was the son of Volga German immigrants and had two brothers and two sisters. In high school, Bauer played football, track and baseball.

== Military career ==
=== Early career ===
Bauer entered the United States Naval Academy in 1926 and was appointed a Marine second lieutenant upon graduation in 1930. His two younger brothers also followed him into the Academy. Following his commissioning, Bauer attended the Officers Basic School at Quantico, Virginia. He was then assigned as a company officer with the 1st Battalion, 6th Marines at Quantico.

In 1932, Bauer became assistant basketball and lacrosse coach at the Naval Academy and an instructor in marksmanship, until his assignment to the San Diego Naval Base, where he was the Assistant Range Officer. Bauer was promoted to first lieutenant on 29 May 1934.

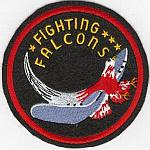
VMF-221 insignia

Bauer was then assigned to the Naval Air Station Pensacola, Florida, in December 1934, where he earned his wings of gold as a naval aviator in February 1936. Bauer was promoted to captain on June 30, 1937, and served with several squadrons at Quantico including Marine Scouting Squadron 1 (VMS-1) and Marine Fighting Squadron 1 (VMF-1). He was transferred to the Naval Air Station San Diego, California, in June 1940, where he served as executive officer of VMF-221. While stationed at San Diego, Bauer participated in carrier group exercises on the USS Lexington (CV-2) and USS Saratoga (CV-3). The December 7, 1941 attack on Pearl Harbor found Bauer and VMF-221 preparing to embark aboard the Saratoga for transport to Hawaii.

=== World War II ===
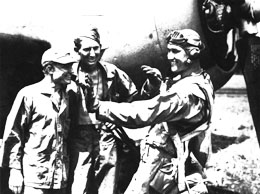
Bauer, at right, pantomimes an air battle to his ground crew.

Following the Japanese attack on Pearl Harbor, Bauer and VMF-221 were transported to Hawaii and were slated to reinforce Wake Island, but were diverted to Midway after Wake fell. Transferred to Hawaii in February 1942, Bauer took command of VMF-211, stationed at Marine Corps Air Station Ewa, and on March 1, 1942, commissioned and took command of VMF-212. Bauer was promoted to major on April 29, and he and VMF-212 were deployed to the South Pacific and were stationed at New Caledonia, and later Efate, Vanuatu. Although still the commanding officer of VMF-212, Bauer was also responsible for the operation of the airfield the squadron operated from and was utilized to select possible sites for additional airfields in the South Pacific. Bauer's promotion to lieutenant colonel, after only three months as a major, was effective 7 August.

On September 28, 1942, Bauer performed the first feat cited for the Medal of Honor. His squadron was attacked by a superior force of Japanese planes. Bauer engaged the enemy and shot down one of their bombers. Again attacking a superior force five days later on October 3, he shot down four of the enemy and left a fifth badly damaged.

While leading a reinforcement flight on October 16, from Espirito Santo, Vanuatu to Guadalcanal, 600 miles (970 km) away, Bauer was about to land at Henderson Field when he noticed a squadron of Japanese planes attacking the USS McFarland (AVD-14) offshore. Though the long flight from Espirito Santo had almost exhausted his fuel and he knew no friendly planes were able to assist him, Bauer immediately proceeded alone to attack the enemy and succeeded in destroying four of them before lack of gasoline forced him to return to Henderson Field.

On November 14, 1942, Bauer was shot down over water after downing two enemy aircraft in an attack 100 miles (160 km) off Guadalcanal. He was seen in the water in his Mae West water flotation device as light was fading. Bauer did not appear to be seriously hurt. The following morning began days of intense searching by planes and Russell Island natives, but no further trace of him was found.

The squadron under his command at Guadalcanal was officially credited with downing 92 Japanese planes and helping to sink two destroyers. Lieutenant Colonel Bauer was commended for his action in the South Pacific by commanders of Army, Navy and Marine Corps units including Admiral William F. Halsey, Jr., then Commander of the South Pacific Area and South Pacific Force.

Bauerfield International Airport in Port Vila, Vanuatu and USS Bauer are named in his honor.

== Medals and decorations ==
Bauer's medals and decorations include:

| | Naval Aviator Badge | |
| | Medal of Honor | |
| Letter of Commendation Ribbon | Purple Heart | Navy Presidential Unit Citation |
| American Defense Service Medal | Asiatic-Pacific Campaign Medal w/ 1 service star | World War II Victory Medal |

=== Medal of Honor citation ===
The President of the United States takes pride in presenting the MEDAL OF HONOR to

LIEUTENANT COLONEL HAROLD W. BAUER
UNITED STATES MARINE CORPS

for service as set forth in the following CITATION:

For extraordinary heroism and conspicuous courage as Squadron Commander of Marine Fighting Squadron TWO TWELVE in the South Pacific Area during the period May 10 to November 14, 1942. Volunteering to pilot a fighter plane in defense of our positions on Guadalcanal, Solomon Islands, Lieutenant Colonel Bauer participated in two air battles against enemy bombers and fighters outnumbering our force more than two-to-one, boldly engaged the enemy and destroyed one Japanese bomber in the engagement of September 28 and shot down four enemy fighter planes in flames on October 3 leaving a fifth smoking badly. After successfully leading twenty-six planes in the over-water ferry flight of more than six hundred miles on October 16, Lieutenant Colonel Bauer, while circling to land, sighted a squadron of enemy planes attacking the USS McFarland. Undaunted by the formidable opposition and with valor above and beyond the call of duty, he engaged the entire squadron and, although alone and his fuel supply nearly exhausted, fought his plane so brilliantly that four of the Japanese planes were destroyed before he was forced down by lack of fuel. His intrepid fighting spirit and distinctive ability as leader and an airman, exemplified in his splendid record of combat achievement, were vital in the successful operations in the South Pacific Area.

/S/FRANKLIN D. ROOSEVELT

== See also ==
- List of Medal of Honor recipients for World War II
