= Frederick R. Payne Jr. =

United States Marine Corps general and fighter ace (1911–2015)

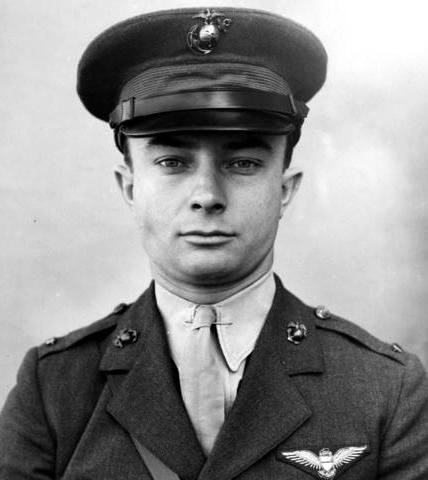
- Born: July 31, 1911; Elmira, New York, United States
- Died: August 6, 2015 (aged 104); Rancho Mirage, California, United States
- Military career
- Allegiance: United States
- Branch: United States Marine Corps
- Service years: 1935–1958
- Rank: Brigadier general
- Nickname: Fritz
- Conflicts: World War II; Korean War
- Awards: Navy Cross; Legion of Merit; Distinguished Flying Cross; Air Medal (6)
- Other work: Southern California Edison (1958–1976)

Frederick Rounsville Payne Jr. (July 31, 1911 – August 6, 2015) was a World War II Ace and a brigadier general in the United States Marine Corps. Payne was awarded the Navy Cross for service with VMF-212.

== Education ==
He attended the United States Naval Academy from 1930 to 1932 and subsequently graduated from the University of Arizona in 1935.

== Career ==
Payne was awarded the Navy Cross for service with VMF-212 on Guadalcanal between September and October 1942, shooting down six Japanese airplanes. After the war, he continued his service with U.S. Marines and fought in the Korean war until he retired from U.S. Marines in 1958. In his post-military career, Payne helped plan the construction of the San Onofre Nuclear Generating Station, He retired from Southern California Edison in 1976. He was also honored with the Congressional Gold Medal in May 2015. Payne died six days after his 104th birthday on August 6, 2015, at Rancho Mirage, California; at the time of his death he was the oldest living former fighter ace.

== Awards ==
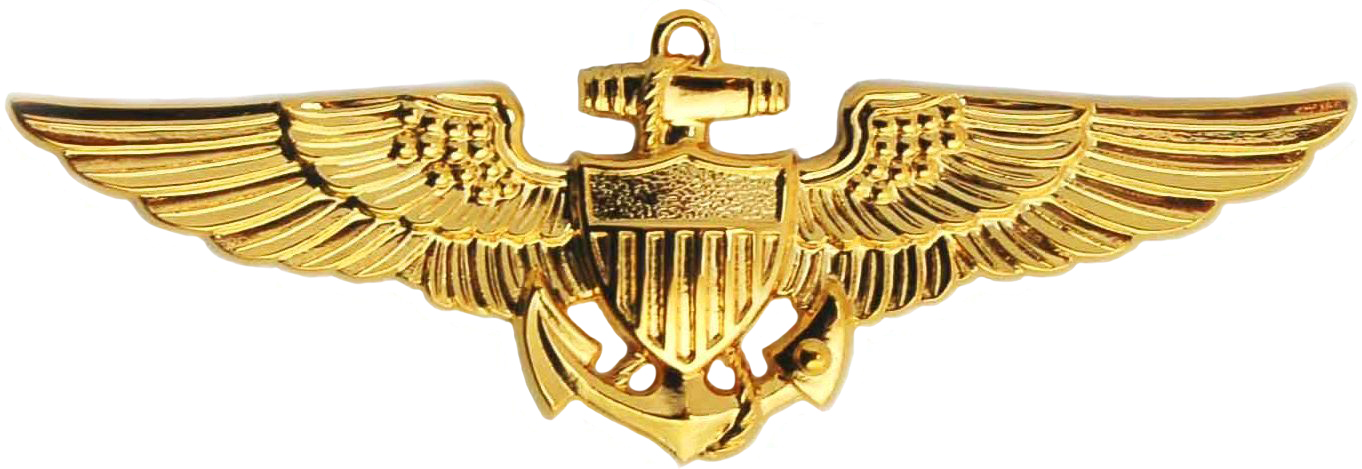

Naval Aviator Badge
Navy Cross	Legion of Merit w/ Combat "V"	Distinguished Flying Cross
Air Medal w/ 5/16" silver star	Navy Presidential Unit Citation w/ 3/16" bronze star	Navy Unit Commendation
American Defense Service Medal w/ fleet clasp	American Campaign Medal	Asiatic–Pacific Campaign Medal w/ one 3/16" silver star and two 3/16 bronze stars
World War II Victory Medal	National Defense Service Medal	Korean Service Medal w/ two 3/16 bronze stars
Republic of Korea Presidential Unit Citation	United Nations Service Medal Korea	Korean War Service Medal (retroactive)

- Congressional Gold Medal (2015)

=== Navy Cross citation ===

The President of the United States of America takes pleasure in presenting the Navy Cross to Major Frederick Rounsville Payne, Jr., United States Marine Corps, for extraordinary heroism and distinguished service in the line of his profession while serving as a Pilot in Marine Fighting Squadron TWO HUNDRED TWELVE (VMF-212), Marine Air Group TWENTY-THREE (MAG-23), FIRST Marine Aircraft Wing, in aerial combat against enemy Japanese forces over Guadalcanal, in the Solomons Islands Area during September and October 1942. Throughout that strenuous period when the island airfield was under constant bombardment and our precarious ground positions were menaced by the desperate counter thrusts of a fanatical foe, Major Payne repeatedly patrolled hostile territory and intercepted enemy bombing flights. With bold determination and courageous disregard of personal safety, he pressed home numerous attacks against heavily escorted waves of invading bombers and, in five vigorous fights against tremendous odds, shot down a total of six Japanese planes. His superb flying skill and dauntless initiative were in keeping with the highest traditions of the United States Naval Service.

== Personal ==
He came from a military family: his father served in the Spanish–American War after graduating from the United States Naval Academy and World War I. He was raised in Indianapolis, Indiana and he also attended the Naval Academy. He enlisted in the Marine Corps and became a pilot. He was married to Dorothy and had three children: Son, Robert Payne, Son, Dewitt, and daughter, Ann Wilson Payne.

== See also ==
- List of World War II aces from the United States
- List of World War II flying aces
